= List of aikidoka =

This is a list of famous and well-known aikido practitioners (aikidōka) sorted by area of primary residence.

Direct students of Morihei Ueshiba are marked with an asterisk*

== Japan ==
=== The Ueshiba family ===
- Morihei Ueshiba – founder of Aikido, often referred to as Ōsensei.
- Kisshomaru Ueshiba – son of founder, second Dōshu*
- Moriteru Ueshiba – son of Kisshomaru, third and current Dōshu*
- Mitsuteru Ueshiba – son of Moriteru and presumed successor

=== Other Japanese aikidoka ===
- Seiseki Abe*
- Tsuneo Ando
- Sadateru Arikawa*
- Seishiro Endo*
- Michio Hikitsuchi*
- Minoru Hirai*
- Takuma Hisa*
- Kazuo Igarashi
- Masatomi Ikeda*
- Shizuo Imaizumi
- Kyoichi Inoue
- Noriaki (Yoichiro) Inoue*
- Hiroshi Isoyama*
- Hiroshi Kato*
- Hirokazu Kobayashi*
- Yasuhiro Konishi*
- Yasuo Kobayashi*
- Takako Kunigoshi*
- Koretoshi Maruyama*
- Shuji Maruyama*
- Minoru Mochizuki*
- Tetsuro Nariyama
- Shoji Nishio*
- Hideo Ohba
- Kisaburo Osawa*
- Hitohiro Saito
- Morihiro Saito*
- Fumiaki Shishida
- Kenji Shimizu*
- Gozo Shioda*
- Seiichi Sugano*
- Morito Suganuma*
- Yoshio Sugino*
- Kanshu Sunadomari*
- Hiroshi Tada*
- Isamu Takeshita*
- Bansen Tanaka*
- Kiyoyuki Terada
- Koichi Tohei*
- Kenji Tomiki*
- Seigo Yamaguchi*
- Terada Kiyoyuki
- Tsutomu Yukawa*

=== Non-Japanese in Japan ===
- Jacques Payet

== Australia ==
- Tony Smibert
- Joe Thambu

== Europe ==
- Kenshiro Abbe*
- Tadashi Abe*
- Katsuaki Asai*
- Pierre Chassang
- Jan Hermansson
- Toshikazu Ichimura
- Masatomi Ikeda
- Loi Lee
- André Nocquet*
- Masamichi Noro*
- Alan Ruddock*
- Stefan Stenudd
- Toshiro Suga
- Nobuyoshi Tamura*
- Christian Tissier
- André Cognard

== North America ==
- Kazuo Chiba*
- Frank Doran
- Terry Dobson*
- Robert Frager*
- Karl Geis
- William Gleason
- Patricia Hendricks
- Gaku Homma*
- Hiroshi Ikeda
- Mitsunari Kanai*
- Roderick Kobayashi
- Harvey Konigsberg
- Takashi Kushida
- George Leonard
- Donald N. Levine
- Thomas H. Makiyama
- Robert Mustard
- Robert Nadeau*
- Mutsuro Nakazono*
- Kenji Ota
- Amos Lee Parker
- Mitsugi Saotome*
- Steven Seagal
- John Stevens
- Richard Strozzi-Heckler
- Roy Y. Suenaka*
- Seiichi Sugano*
- Jon Takagi
- Akira Tohei*
- Fumio Toyoda
- Nick Walker
- Yoshimitsu Yamada*

== South East Asia ==
- Benjamin Galarpe

== South America ==
- Reishin Kawai

== Literature ==
- Pranin, Stanley A, ed. Aikido masters: prewar students of Morihei Ueshiba. Tokyo: Aiki News. 1993. ISBN 4-900586-14-5 This volume contains 14 in-depth interviews with direct participants in the early days of Aikido publisher
- Stone, John and Meyer, Ron (eds.) Aikido in America North Atlantic Books 1995. ISBN 1883319277 Interviews limited to 13 aikidoists in the United States from 1990 to 1994; not meant to be comprehensive, Japanese teachers not covered. Editors were primarily interested in how Americans have responded to, changed, and expanded Aikido in the United States.
