= Alan Ruddock =

Irish martial artist (1944–2012)

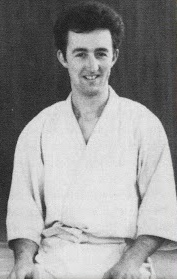
- Born: 10 January 1944; Dublin, Ireland
- Died: 2 April 2012 (aged 68); Dublin, Ireland
- Nationality: Irish
- Style: Aikido, Karate
- Teachers: Morihei Ueshiba, Koichi Tohei, Shoji Nishio, Hirokazu Kobayashi and Norihiko Ichihashi
- Rank: 6th dan Aikido

Alan Ruddock (10 January 1944 – 2 April 2012) was an Irish martial arts pioneer, teacher and writer. He introduced both Aikido and Karate to Ireland and was the founder of the Aiki no Michi and its interpretation of Aikido. Ruddock was one of very few Westerners and the only Irish national to study directly under the founder of Aikido, Morihei Ueshiba.

== Early years ==
Tetsuji Murakami and a 16-year-old Alan Ruddock.

Alan Thomas Ruddock was born in Dublin in 1944. At age thirteen he found a book on Judo and from there his martial arts interest developed, he soon heard about Karate but there were no dojos or instructors at that time in Ireland so he trained with school friends. He built a makiwara in the garden and practised on concrete paths.

Ruddock was one of Ireland's first Karate practitioners and formally introduced the martial art to that country with his forming of the Irish Karate-Do Society. Ruddock subsequently became the representative in Ireland for the Japan Karate Association. Tetsugi Murakami was the chief instructor. Murakami had studied in Mochizuki's school in Japan where they studied Judo, Aikido and Karate.

Ruddock discovered Aikido with Murakami on his initial Karate course in England. On that course he had his first Karate grading from Murakami. The Aikido class was only for one hour but it sowed a seed. Just like Karate, there was no one to teach him Aikido in Ireland. Ruddock got Koichi Tohei's book, and started to teach himself. As a Merchant Navy Radio Officer, Ruddock travelled all over the world. His last trip took him to Japan where he visited the Aikikai Hombo Dojo in Tokyo to view a class. Morihei Ueshiba wasn't present on that occasion but Ruddock witnessed some other Sensei including Saotome. Ruddock also met Henry Kono (see below) & Ken Cottier who subsequently helped Ruddock obtain his Japanese visa (to train in Aikido in Tokyo). Ruddock was determined to return to learn Aikido at the source. When he returned to Ireland to prepare, he took a week long summer course run by Ken Williams in England. Mutsuro Nakazono was the instructor. This was the only instruction Ruddock received from any aikidoka prior his voyage back to Japan.

== Japan period ==
Ruddock went back to Japan in 1966 specifically to learn Aikido, travelling six weeks by sea. He first saw Ueshiba about four days after he started regular training. "He was the real reason for my Aikido pilgrimage to Japan. I had read quite a bit about this miraculous old man and having seen the pictures – I wanted the real thing. I knew what he did was special and wanted to be like that too – but I did not feel the same 'Wow – this is something else!" kind of response that others report. I was impressed and intrigued – but not overawed. My journey to Japan was a personal spiritual quest and I realised that this man was someone you only get to be around once – he was a true mystic. Over the coming months and years I was to see him on a daily basis (when he was in Tokyo). As a karate man with both Judo and Jujitsu experience, I was not easily impressed by people flying through the air for apparently no reason. I had made a huge effort by modern standards to be there to learn what was on offer but – over the first few months I began to think – 'Can this really be true, these guys are just falling over...' Then, little by little, as other guys who had 'gone for him' described their bewildering experiences of falling ( for no good reason ) and also my own careful observations of the reactions of his Ukes – I was convinced that this man was incredible."

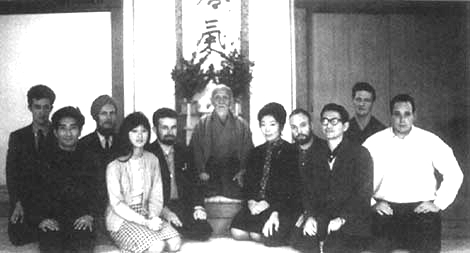
Ueshiba surrounded by the group of foreign students. Left to right: Alan Ruddock, Henry Kono, Per Winter, Joanne Willard, Joe Deisher, Morihei Ueshiba, Joanne Shimamoto, Kenneth Cottier, unknown, Norman Miles and Terry Dobson (photo taken by George Willard with Henry Kono's camera)

Whenever Morihei Ueshiba took a class Ruddock "tried to pay close attention to what he did, but it must be remembered, not one of any sensei's class was a lesson as we might think of it. The sensei did a 'technique' and then everyone got up and tried to replicate what had been done. If they came to 'help' you it was merely a straightforward re-enactment of what they had done initially. The only one who 'taught' in our western understanding was Koichi Tohei who had been to Hawaii and parts of the United States. Koichi Tohei was the only sensei who gave lessons or spoke to foreigners in English. His style was very free.... Now he is known for Ki Aikido. I attended all of the lessons he gave in a small dojo in Iidabashi."

There were only a few foreigners at the Hombo dojo at that time, including Henry Kono. Kono was a Canadian of Japanese descent and the only foreigner present at the time who was able to speak Japanese thus providing a 'bridge' for the gaijin students and allowing him to gather certain insights about the essence of what Morihei Ueshiba was doing.

Ruddock trained every day of the week at the Hombo Dojo. During this period Ruddock was the only Irishman and Ken Cottier was the only Englishman training under Ueshiba. There were five Americans including George Willard and Terry Dobson with Henry Kono being the only Canadian. There were a few Japanese women who trained and two foreigners, Joanne Shimamoto (who later married Akira Tohei) who was an American like Virginia Mayhew who was Nidan and set up the Hong Kong Aikikai prior to Kenneth Cottier.

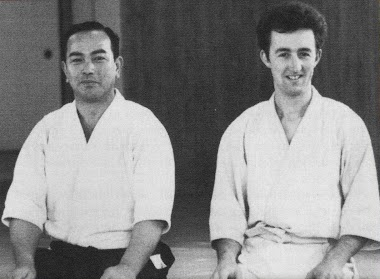
Ruddock with Koichi Tohei Sensei in Iidabashi dojo (photo by Henry Kono)

Senseis (instructors) at the dojo during this period, apart from the founder Morihei Ueshiba & Koichi Tohei included Kisshomaru Ueshiba, Shoji Nishio, Seigo Yamaguchi, Kisaburo Osawa, Morihiro Saito, Mitsugi Saotome, Hirozaku Kobayashi and Norihiko Ichihashi. In addition to Ruddock witnessing Ueshiba first hand on a couple of hundred occasions, he took extra private lessons, firstly from Kobayashi and then Ichihashi. In his memoir Ruddock recalled Ueshiba intervening when Ichihashi became overly zealous in his throws but also fondly remembered many aspects of the latter's instruction and in particular advice Ichihashi provided as he was about to return to Ireland: "Remember, all these things like bowing and sitting in seiza are Japanese – not Aikido. You know better than we do how to teach foreigners. When you go back home, respect the ways of your country, remember to teach Aikido your way."

Ruddock also trained at Nishio's Otsuka Dojo (the latter held senior dan grades in Aikido, Iaido and Karate). As an ex-karate man Ruddock "loved his Aikido – so dynamic and full of moves which cross-referenced all of his arts. He always included some live blade defence work in his demonstration of Aikido. Taking Ukemi from Nishio was exciting – he did quite a few full body throws and would throw you right through the floor of the Otsuka Dojo -which fortunately was well sprung." As noted above, Ruddock also attended regular classes with Tohei at the later's Iidabashi dojo .

When interviewed in 2008, Ruddock was asked for his take on the supposedly supernatural prowess of Morihei Ueshiba that are often mentioned in Aikido circles, to which he replied: "I don't think magic or the supernatural came into it. If you meet someone from the Amazon rain forest and use your mobile phone to get something they want dropped to where you are by helicopter, they may think that is magic. However, once they get a mobile themselves, they will realise how easy it actually was for you. In terms of O-Sensei's ability, if you begin to understand the real meaning of Ai Ki, his 'mobile phone' is within your grasp!"

After spending three years in Japan, Ruddock left shortly before Ueshiba's death. He then spent a few months helping Virginia Mayhew run the Hong Kong Aikikai.

== Return to Europe ==
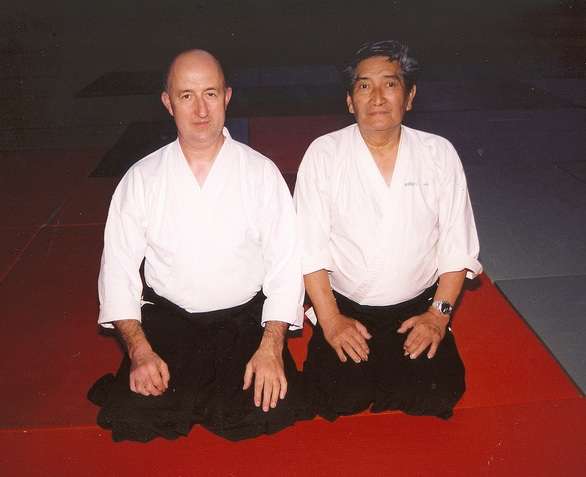
Alan Ruddock and Henry Kono led Galway Summer Aikido School.

Ruddock returned to Dublin and started an Aikido group which had a number of the people with whom he had originally learned Karate with as members. There was no formal structure at that time nor anyone else practising Aikido. Leaving Ireland to find employment, Ruddock went to London but soon realised that he was on a "different path to others who followed the 'official' Aikido line". Having spent three years at the source he "knew where he wanted to be, even if he was not quite sure yet how to get there". He taught a small Aikido group at the college where he studied to become a schoolteacher.

Ruddock subsequently moved to the Isle of Man (IOM) and started an Aikido group in 1975. After a few years when students wished to be graded, he joined with the Aikikai group in Britain. This was on track for a number of years, but the sense of being part of a worldwide monumental structure operated like a commercial business from Japan was not where he wished to be. He left and set up his own group called Aiki no Michi. This is an umbrella organisation where anyone from any dojo or 'style' was welcome to come to explore an Aikido which was "always focused on the essential simplicity of the Founder's art."

In 1995 Ruddock reconnected with Henry Kono and the latter subsequently travelled to Europe many times to jointly instruct at various Aikido seminars. Kono's outlook on Aikido contributed to the philosophy of the Aiki no Michi organisation.

In later years Ruddock split his time between IOM and Ireland with the IOM Aikido club being his home dojo. Via his instruction, Alan helped guide the development of numerous Aikido organisations across several countries until his death.

== A new take on Aikido ==
Ruddock graded to 4th dan with the Aikikai but (see above) then decided to part company with that organisation. He subsequently graded sixth dan within the Butokukai (which Morihei Ueshiba had been involved with originally), an organisation which includes all Japanese martial arts. Ruddock is on record as saying the only certificate he really valued was his shodan (1st degree black belt) taken in the original old Hombu Dojo in Tokyo, he usually never mentioned his grade.

In recent years Ruddock travelled extensively to give seminars in Ireland, UK, Poland, Germany, Italy, the Basque Country, Portugal and the Netherlands. Ruddocks' Aikido being somewhat different from the standard taught by Aikikai teachers, his ideas did not suit everyone (see next section). "Some people enjoy Bash Ki Do, I personally enjoy Aikido."

== Development, controversy and legacy ==
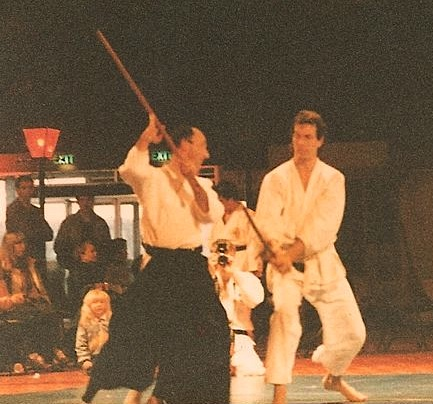
Ruddock and David Halsall at a 1985 Isle of Man Aikido demonstration

Like many modern martial arts, Aikido derives from a number of prior systems but the latter is relatively unique in being widely recognised as the primary distillation/creation of one man—Morihei Ueshiba. Ueshiba trained a large number of students, many of whom grew into great teachers in their own right. There are roughly four generations of Ueshiba direct students with Ruddock (given his training at the Hombo Dojo from 1966 to 1969) belonging to Fourth (and last) generation (c.1956–c.1969). Ueshiba was in his eighties by this time and as he "grew older, more skilled, and more spiritual in his outlook, his art also changed and became softer and more circular. Striking techniques became less important and the formal curriculum became simpler. In his own expression of the art there was a greater emphasis on what is referred to as kokyū-nage, or "breath throws" which are soft and blending, utilising the opponent's movement to throw them. Many of these techniques are rooted in the aiki-no-jutsu portions of the Daitō-ryū curriculum rather than the more direct jujutsu style joint-locking techniques."

Some Aikido practitioners, often those whose training lineage derives from direct students (other than Ruddock) who trained with Ueshiba earlier in his life and thus passed on a 'harder' style of the art, have argued that this was "old man's Aikido" and by implication questioned if such an interpretation is effective in its execution as a martial discipline. Ruddock was a teacher rather than a politician and tended to avoid such parsing while focusing on conveying his own understanding of Aikido. In his memoir, Ruddock makes a point of observing that "many Aikidoka try to create what they assume O-Sensei was doing before the Second World War. I try to create what I actually saw him doing in his later life. Even by observing the pre-war film of his demonstration it is possible to clearly observe the means by which he seeks to confuse those who seek his 'secret'."

In 1997 Ruddock said: "Being around O Sensei was a gift. Somehow everyone who trained at that time seems to have come away with some unique Aikido experience and an interpretation of Aikido that is both individual and profound. Morihei Ueshiba gave to anyone who was open but he was also a man apart- even from the Japanese. You 'got it' by being there and doing the business – not by special treatment. In fact working it out for yourself was par for the course."

When asked in 2008 to describe the main aspects of his teaching, Ruddock said:
"I try to show to students the simplicity of basic 'techniques' which actually follow the principle of genuine Ai Ki. It requires a quantum leap in perception to actually execute these moves as real Aikido. The difficulty lies in what we try to 'do' or not 'do'."

Responding to the observation that he doesn't like postures and big stances:
"Posture is important. We need to stand up and move. However, other postural notions and stances inhibit our natural motion. If we fix the position of our feet we inhibit our ability to stay at the neutral point. They also encourage us to 'do' something to our uke, to 'power' them into the mat, performing smashkido."

And in reply to a query that Ruddock didn't necessarily look at uke while performing Aikido:
"If you 'look' at something you are attached to it. If you just SEE out of the windows, your mind is free and unattached. If you 'look', you reduce the scope of information reaching your consciousness. You get more about what you are 'looking' at and a lot less about what you can SEE from the same position. In terms of Aikido as 'one against many', seeing is more valuable than looking....
The message I would give to Aikidoka in general is that what we see today is not, in my humble opinion, the Aikido of the founder. It has become so many other things. So many complications, additions and unnecessary requirements hide the essential nature of the art. However, those who seek shall find, and if they are able to step outside of the box and dispassionately explore, they may discover a very simple magical secret!".

== Death ==
Ruddock was taken ill while returning home from a weekend of Aikido training in Midleton, County Cork and died peacefully on 2 April 2012 in Beaumont Hospital, Dublin. He is survived by his wife and three children.

== Bibliography ==
- Alan Ruddock: Aikido Memoirs – One Irishman's lifetime search for the answer to the mystery of Morihei Ueshiba's Aikido, Publisher: Aiki Pathways, Published, 21 May 2011, Pages 139, ISBN 0955323525
- Alan Ruddock: Tales from the Life of Kenneth George Edward Cottier – Publisher: Aiki Pathways, Published: 20 September 2011, Pages:95

== See also ==
- List of aikidoka
- Morihei Ueshiba Legacy
