= Robert Nadeau (aikidoka) =

American aikido teacher (born 1937)

- Other names: Bob Nadeau
- Nationality: American
- Style: Aikido
- Teachers: Robert Tann; Koichi Tohei; Morihei Ueshiba
- Rank: 8th dan (Aikikai)

Other information
- Notable students: George Leonard; Richard Strozzi-Heckler; Dan Millman; Richard Moon

Robert Nadeau (born 1937) is an American aikido teacher who holds the rank of 8th dan and the title shihan (master teacher). He trained at the Aikikai Hombu Dojo in Tokyo from 1962 to 1964 and has taught in Northern California since the mid-1960s. Writers on aikido and the body, including George Leonard and Richard Strozzi-Heckler, have described his emphasis on the energy and awareness aspects of the art and its use beyond the dojo, in fields such as psychotherapy and personal development. He was one of the principal instructors of the Aikido Association of Northern California and heads Division 3 of the California Aikido Association.

== Early life and training ==
Nadeau began training in martial arts at the age of 16, studying judo under Yasutoshi "Moon" Watanabe, who incorporated mind-development methods into his teaching. He also studied with Walt Baptiste, a yoga teacher in Northern California whom Nadeau has credited as a formative influence, practiced karate, and taught self-defense to law enforcement personnel.

Before traveling to Japan, Nadeau studied aikido under Robert Tann, (Note: Some sources spell the name Tan.) a Marine Corps veteran and South San Francisco police officer who taught aikido in South San Francisco from 1960 to 1972. Nadeau recalled that Tann's was then the only aikido dojo he knew of in Northern California.

Before leaving for Japan, Nadeau was introduced to Seicho-no-Ie, the Japanese new religious movement founded by Masaharu Taniguchi, through a friend who taught it in California. He later recalled overhearing Ueshiba mention Taniguchi in the dojo, and being told that Ueshiba had said, "I walked the same Path as Taniguchi Sensei."

== Training in Japan (1962–1964) ==
Nadeau (left) with Morihei Ueshiba in 1964

In 1962 Nadeau travelled to Japan by ship. In Tokyo he first enrolled at several institutions at once, including the Japan Karate Association, the Kodokan and the Aikikai Hombu Dojo, but narrowed his focus to aikido, taking an apartment in the Wakamatsu-chō neighborhood next to the Hombu Dojo.

In 1962 Nadeau traveled to Japan by ship. In Tokyo he enrolled at several schools at once, including the Japan Karate Association, the Kodokan and the Aikikai Hombu Dojo, before narrowing his focus to aikido and taking an apartment in the Wakamatsu-chō neighborhood beside the Hombu Dojo.

As Nadeau recalled them, the principal instructors at the Hombu Dojo in 1962 were Kisaburo Osawa, Kisshomaru Ueshiba, Koichi Tohei, Sadateru Arikawa and Seigo Yamaguchi, with Morihiro Saito teaching on Sundays. He trained alongside the uchi-deshi (live-in students) of the period, among them Yoshimitsu Yamada, Seiichi Sugano, Kazuo Chiba, Mitsugi Saotome and Nobuyoshi Tamura. He was particularly close to Yamada, Mitsunari Kanai and Sugano, and to Yutaka Kurita and Eddie Hagihara. He also took private lessons from Tohei, which sometimes grew into small group sessions joined by Sugano and, when he visited, Frank Doran. Outside the Hombu Dojo he trained informally with a group of Western martial artists that included Terry Dobson and Donn F. Draeger, and with the Chinese internal arts teacher Wang Shu-jin. The psychologist Robert Frager, who arrived at the Hombu Dojo during this period, recalled that Nadeau "was the first one I trained with" and that he spent most of his time with "the guys who were local, which was Robert Nadeau and Frank Doran".

Aikido in America (1995) presents Nadeau as one of Morihei Ueshiba's personal American students. According to Nadeau and his biographers, Ueshiba invited him to private conversations about the philosophical and spiritual foundations of aikido after Nadeau asked him a question about them, including during trips to Iwama. While in Japan, Nadeau was involved with Aikido, the short-lived English-language edition of the Aikikai's newspaper; its first issue, in January 1964, carried his article "Want to Study Aikido in Tokyo?".

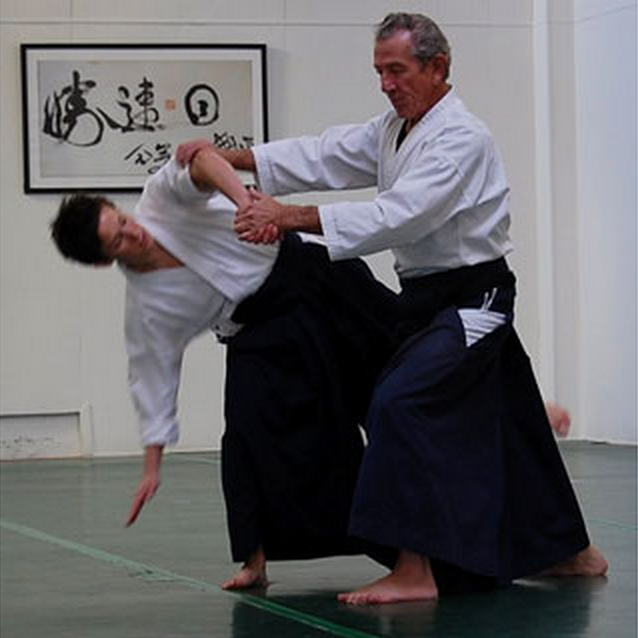
Scroll presented to Nadeau by Morihei Ueshiba

At the end of his stay, Nadeau received a certificate authorizing him to teach aikido, signed by Morihei and Kisshomaru Ueshiba. Ueshiba also gave him several calligraphic scrolls, one of which has been translated as "Do the aikido that cannot be seen with the human eye." After returning to California, Nadeau made a second trip to Japan of about three months.

== Teaching career ==
=== Northern California ===
According to Bob Noha, a longtime student, a dojo in Mountain View wrote to the Aikikai asking for an instructor, and Nadeau was sent to it after his return from Japan. Nadeau began teaching in 1965, opening a small dojo in Menlo Park and soon teaching full-time. In his early years he shared training space with the Danzan-ryū jujutsu teachers Sig Kufferath and, later, Richard Bunch, and kept up contact with several jujutsu schools.

Nadeau worked closely with Frank Doran, who taught in Brisbane and later in Half Moon Bay; the two held regular exchange classes. They later co-founded a dojo on Turk Street in San Francisco, which became City Aikido of San Francisco, and invited Bill Witt, a former Mountain View student who had trained with Morihiro Saito, to join as a third instructor; Nadeau described the aim as a "Hombu Dojo-type" setting with several teachers. He later opened Aikido of San Jose, which he sold to Jack Wada. The San Rafael Summer Camp, a long-running annual gathering of the Northern California aikido community, began at Doran's suggestion after an overnight seminar Nadeau had organized in Mountain View.

With Robert Frager, Nadeau developed workshops at the University of California, Berkeley to make the experience of aikido accessible to non-practitioners, using centering, energy-flow and sensitivity exercises. By Nadeau's account, the work came to the attention of Michael Murphy, co-founder of the Esalen Institute, through the psychologist Charles Tart. Nadeau went on to lead monthly workshops at Esalen for about twelve years, alongside presenters such as Abraham Maslow, Fritz Perls, Ida Rolf and Gabrielle Roth.

George Leonard, a figure in the human potential movement, was first taught aikido by Nadeau. According to Integral Transformative Practice International, the organization Leonard co-founded, Leonard felt that Nadeau "really wanted to teach them energy awareness instead of Aikido" when he began teaching Murphy, Leonard and other Esalen staff, until the students asked him to buy mats so they could practice the art itself. Leonard later developed the energy work into Leonard Energy Training "with Nadeau Sensei's blessing". Richard Strozzi-Heckler has described Nadeau and Doran as his "primary teachers".

Advertisements for "A Festival of the Happy Martial Arts" at Stanford's Frost Amphitheater in May 1978 billed Nadeau as "Spiritual teacher and Director of Northern California Aikido". He teaches at City Aikido of San Francisco, Aikido of San Jose and Aikido of Mountain View.

Advertisements for "A Festival of the Happy Martial Arts" at Stanford's Frost Amphitheater in May 1978 billed Nadeau as "Spiritual teacher and Director of Northern California Aikido". According to the California Aikido Association, he teaches at City Aikido of San Francisco, Aikido of San Jose and Aikido of Mountain View.

=== Organizations ===
The Aikido Association of Northern California, established around 1974 and described as the largest aikido organization in the state, named Nadeau, Doran and Witt as its principal instructors. Its successor, the California Aikido Association, was formed in 2002; Nadeau was one of its founders and heads its Division 3, which includes dojos in the United States, Europe and New Zealand.

=== International seminars ===
Nadeau has taught workshops in the United States, Switzerland, Israel, the Soviet Union and New Zealand. According to the Moscow Aiki Club's history of aikido in Saint Petersburg, he led a training at the Lenkai Aikido Club in Leningrad (now Saint Petersburg) on October 27, 1990, the day of the founding conference of the USSR Aikido Federation, when he held the rank of 6th dan. The Lenkai club, whose founder Sergey Kiselev was the federation's first president, also records the visit, and instructors from the Federal Alliance of Bujutsu in Kazan recall training with Nadeau in this period. In March 2019 he led the O Sensei Revisited Down Under workshop in Auckland, New Zealand, with Richard Moon.

== Teaching philosophy ==
After returning from Japan, Nadeau began combining energy-awareness practices with aikido's physical curriculum. He has described this as a move from purely physical technique toward "energy work": a progression of bodily and attentional states in which a practitioner moves from muscular effort to fluid, responsive movement that, he says, has "its own timing".

Nadeau has said that his aim is not to pass on his own way of moving but to help students find and refine theirs. He has also said that meditation noticeably changed the quality of his judo and aikido, an observation that became a basis for his teaching. Before travelling to Japan, Nadeau studied aikido under Robert Tann, (Note: Some sources spell the name Tan.) a Marine Corps veteran and South San Francisco police officer who taught aikido in South San Francisco from 1960 to 1972. Nadeau later recalled that Tann's was then the only known aikido dojo in Northern California.

Laurin Herr, who trained under Michio Hikitsuchi at the Kumano Juku Dojo in Shingū before studying with Nadeau and later co-wrote his biography, has compared the two teachers' vocabularies: where Hikitsuchi spoke of kamisama, misogi (purification) and shugyō, Nadeau speaks of relaxing, allowing energy to flow and a "return to the origin". Herr describes "an enormous consistency in the core lessons" among Ueshiba's direct students.

== Media ==
- O-Sensei's Process (DVD). Aikido Journal, 2011.
