= Igarashi =

Igarashi, Ikarashi or Isoarashi (五十嵐; "fifty storms") is a Japanese surname. This surname said to have origin Ikarashi river, that flows in central Niigata Prefecture.

The name of Ikarashi comes from the ancient legend of Yamato prince Ikatarashihiko-no-mikoto (五十日足彦命), pioneer of this region, or Ainu word Inkar-us-i ("overlook-always doing-place", same etymology with Engaru).

Notable people with the surname include:

- Aguri Igarashi (五十嵐 あぐり; born 1975), Japanese manga artist
- Akitoshi Igarashi (五十嵐 明要; born 1932), Japanese jazz saxophonist
- Chihiro Igarashi (五十嵐 千尋; born 1995), Japanese swimmer
- Daisuke Igarashi (五十嵐 大介; born 1969), Japanese manga artist
- Fumio Igarashi (五十嵐 文男; born 1958), Japanese figure skater
- Haruto Igarashi (五十嵐晴冬; born 2002), Japanese freestyle skier
- Hiromi Igarashi (五十嵐 裕美; born 1986), Japanese voice actress
- Hiroyuki Igarashi (五十嵐 広行; born 1969), Japanese dancer and record producer
- Hisato Igarashi (五十嵐 久人; born 1951), Japanese gymnast
- Hitoshi Igarashi (五十嵐 一; 1947—1991), Japanese scholar and murder victim
- Jokichi Ikarashi (五十嵐 丈吉; 1902–2013), Japanese supercentenarian
- Kazuo Igarashi (五十嵐 和男; born 1946), Japanese aikidoka
- Kazuya Igarashi (五十嵐 和也; born 1965), Japanese footballer
- Kei Igarashi (五十嵐 圭; born 1980), Japanese basketball player
- Koji Igarashi (五十嵐 孝司; born 1968), Japanese video game producer and director
- Kozo Igarashi (五十嵐 広三; 1926–2013), Japanese politician
- Megumi Igarashi (五十嵐 恵; born 1976), Japanese artist
- Miki Igarashi (五十嵐 美紀; born 1971), Japanese long-distance runner
- Mikio Igarashi (五十嵐 三喜夫; born 1955), Japanese manga artist
- Mitsuko Igarashi (五十嵐 充子; born 1977), Japanese ice hockey player
- Mitsuru Igarashi (五十嵐 充; born 1969), Japanese keyboardist and songwriter
- Rei Igarashi (五十嵐 麗; born 1963), Japanese actress and voice actress
- Runa Igarashi] (五十嵐瑠奈; born 2004), Japanese freestyle skier
- Ryota Igarashi (五十嵐 亮太; born 1979), Japanese baseball player
- Satsuki Igarashi (いがらし 寒月; born 1969), Japanese manga artist
- Shunji Igarashi (五十嵐 隼士; born 1986), Japanese actor
- Takuya Igarashi (五十嵐 卓哉), Japanese anime director
- Toshiyuki Igarashi (五十嵐 俊幸; born 1984), Japanese boxer
- Yu Igarashi (五十嵐 優; born 1995), Japanese badminton player
- Yuji Igarashi (五十嵐 雄二; born 1968), Japanese golfer
- Yumiko Igarashi (いがらし ゆみこ; born 1950), Japanese manga artist and artist
- Yūsaku Igarashi (五十嵐 雄策), Japanese writer
- Kanoa Igarashi (五十嵐カノア; born 1997), Japanese-American Surfer

== Fictional characters ==
- Sayaka Igarashi (五十嵐 清華), the secretary of the Student Council in Kakegurui
- Ganta Igarashi (五十嵐 丸太), protagonist of the manga series Deadman Wonderland
- Ikki Igarashi (五十嵐一輝), main character who can transform as Kamen Rider Revi in Kamen Rider Revice
- Sakuko Igarashi (五十嵐咲子), one of two secondary antagonists in Silent Hill f
