= Toshiro Suga =

Japanese aikidoka (born 1950)

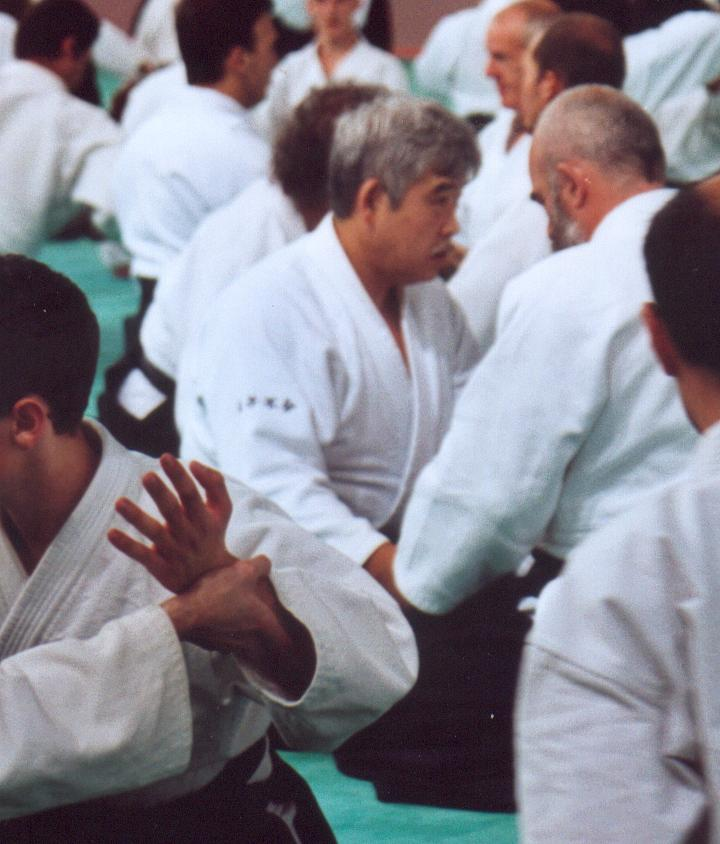
Toshiro Suga at the International training of aikido in Lesneven, 2006

Toshirō Suga (born 22 August 1950) is a Japanese aikido instructor. He holds the rank of 7th dan Aikikai.

Born in Tokyo, his aikido teachers included Morihei Ueshiba, the founder of the martial art, and Morihiro Saito. For many years, he taught military forces in Canada. He takes part in international seminars.

He had a brief career in cinema, thanks in part to his student Michael G. Wilson. His best known part was as Chang in the 1979 James Bond film Moonraker.

Suga leads courses throughout Europe and conducts dan examinations for the Free German Aikido Association. He currently lives in Paris.

== Martial arts training ==
Toshirô Suga started judo at age 15 in the Tokyo police force dojo. At the age of 17 (1968), guided by his father's advice, he began Aikido in the Aikikai Hombu Dojo in Tokyo. For the following year and a half, he had daily teaching from Morihei Ueshiba during the 15h00 class of Sadateru Arikawa sensei.

He also attended the daily classes of Mitsugi Saotome, Akira Tohei, Yasuo Kobayashi, Tohei Koichi, Kisshōmaru Ueshiba and Morihiro Saito.

Toshirô Suga arrived in France during the summer 1971 and met Nobuyoshi Tamura sensei.

He works as Chargé d'Enseignement National with the FFAB, and is 7th dan (7. Dan Aikikai Tokyo). He teaches all year long in his dojo.

== Teaching aikido in France ==
- From 1980 to 1985 his first class as a teacher was in Saint-Brieuc.
- From 1985 to 1989 he went to Canada where he taught aïkido to the army.
- From 1989 to 2002 He taught in Brest.
- Since 2002: ASH Aïkido à Herblay and Aïkido club Boisséen.

== Movies ==
Acting

- Moonraker, Lewis Gilbert, 1979 : Chang
- Tout dépend des filles..., Pierre Fabre, 1980 : Takashi
- Le Bouffon (TV), Guy Jorré, 1981 : the Japanese
- Charlots connection, Jean Couturier, 1984 :

== Aikido DVDs ==
- Ken, les racines de l'aïkido, 2006
- Jo, le pilier de l'aïkido
- Les Fondements de l'aïkido
