= Chassang =

Chassang is a surname. Notable people with the surname include:

- Alexis Chassang (1827–1888), a French translator
- Jean Chassang (born 1951), a French cyclist
- Pierre Chassang (1919–2013), a French aikidoka
