= Patrick Lee Hammond =

American singer

- Born: April 11, 1947 (age 79); Oklahoma City, Oklahoma, United States
- Genres: Blues, rock, avant-garde progressive rock, R&B, rock and roll
- Occupations: Bassist, songwriter, musician, producer
- Instruments: Bass guitar, guitar, harmonica
- Years active: 1966–present
- Labels: Sony, Warner Bros.
- Website: www.patrickleehammond.com

Patrick Lee Hammond (born April 11, 1947) is an American bassist, singer, songwriter, and producer. Born in Oklahoma City, Oklahoma. He has recorded on several labels, worked with a wide range of recording artists. His work on "Live Ananda" with Krishna Das received a Grammy Award Nomination in 2013.

== History ==
=== Early life and career ===
The son of a US Air Force Chief Master Sergeant and the former Oklahoma women's state champion barrel racer, Patrick Hammond lived in several locations in Oklahoma and spent four years in Bermuda where he attended St. George Grammar School. In 1961 his family moved to Chanute Air Force Base in Rantoul, Illinois where he graduated from high school in 1964. He began playing guitar at age 16 and switched to electric bass while attending the University of Illinois from which he graduated in 1973.

Hammond toured the Midwest from 1968 to 1983 with several bands, the best known of which was Duke Tumatoe & The All Star Frogs, a legendary bar band. "We were the kind of band that made the walls sweat.”

=== Later years ===
Exhausted and burned out from touring Patrick entered psychotherapy in 1981 to deal with his personal demons as well as a severe cocaine habit. "When I finally realized I wasn't in the music business, I was in the liquor business, I said to myself, "It is time to learn to write songs." Patrick wrote and recorded song demos in Los Angeles and Nashville. "Working in Nashville was like attending a college for songwriters." From mid-eighties to late nineties "I was very fortunate that my first writing partner, Dana Walden, was talented, successful, and generous. I learned a great deal from him." In 1983 he began twenty years of practicing Aikido under the direction of Akira Tohei Shihan.

In 1988 he began private practice as a psychotherapist. Between 1998 and 2006 he worked for Tibetan Master Tsoknyi Rinpoche and the Pundarika Foundation, moving to Crestone, Colorado 2005.

His latest Album is "One Taste" and today he teaches and collaborates with a wide range of singers and musicians, toured with Krishna Das from 2006 until 2010. His latest CD,"Real Fake", is scheduled for release in August 2016.

== Discography ==
- "Red Pepper Hot" – Duke Tumatoe and the All-Star Frogs 1976
- "Naughty Child" – Duke Tumatoe and the All-Star Frogs 1980
- "Back to Chicago" – Duke Tumatoe and the All-Star Frogs 1982
- "Stone Grey Day" (First CD in a planned trilogy about the American Civil War)
- "Live Ananda" with Krishna Das (2013)
- "One Taste" (2013)
- "Real Fake" (2016)

=== Songs written and recorded by other artists ===
- "Tie You Up" – Duke Tumatoe and the Power Trio Warner Bros. Records
- "You Impress Me" Columbia Records
- "Close to the Bone" Columbia Records
- "Somewhere in Chicago"
- "Exception to the Rule"
- "Chamatkari Babaji"
