= Stefan Stenudd =

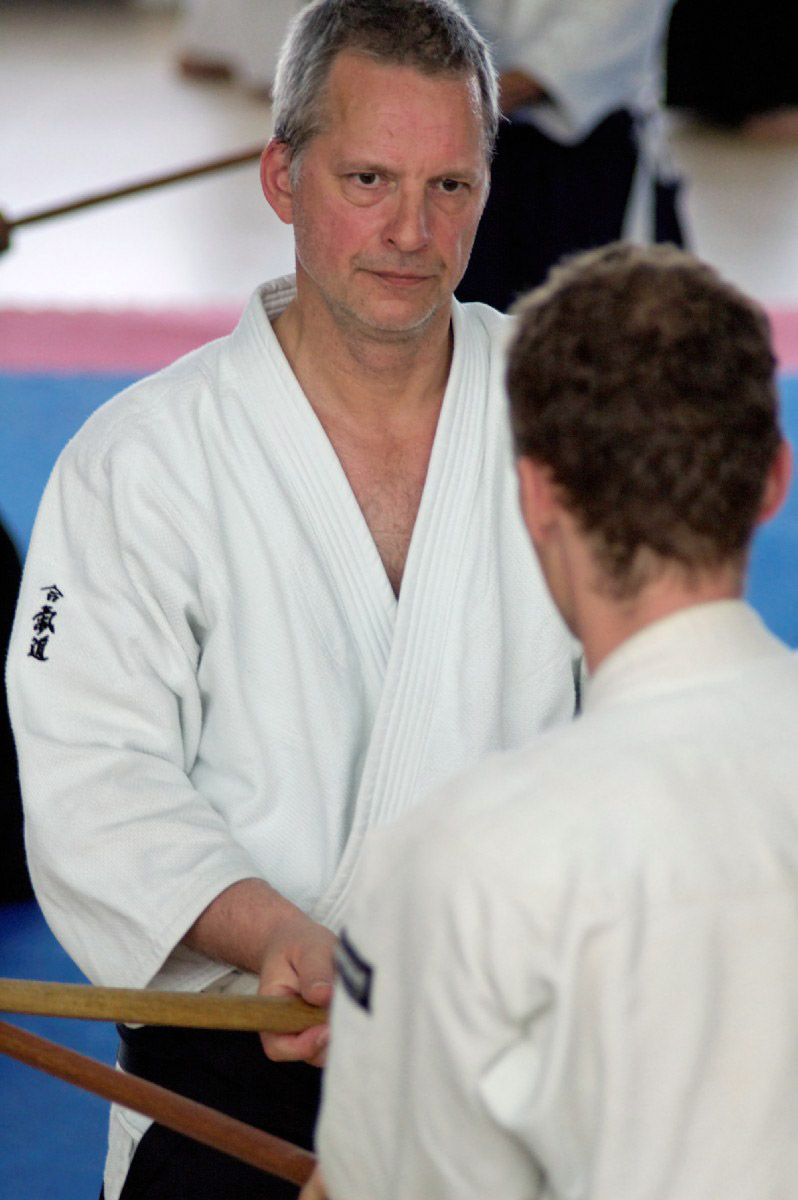
Stefan Stenudd (2009)

Stefan Stenudd (born 1954 in Stockholm) is one of the most prominent aikido teachers in Sweden, and also active as writer, astrologist and freelance journalist. He holds 7th dan and is a Shihan in the aikido organisation Aikikai, a rank he acquired in 2003, and 4th dan in Shoji Nishios own iaido system, aikido toho.

Stenudd started his aikido training in the Stockholm suburb Järfälla in 1972. Stenudd along with many others was close to the resident Japanese aikido teacher Toshikazu Ichimura but also had conflicts with him, which was part of the reasons for him starting his first own dojo in 1978, in the Stockholm suburb Brandbergen in Haninge. In 1991 he moved to Malmö in southern Sweden, and started aikido there in the big sports and martial arts club Enighet. Beside his Enighet dojo, he also teaches regularly at several other dojos in the region and teaches seminars in Germany and the Czech Republic. His technical main influences are the Japanese teachers Ichimura and Nishio, although his style in many respect is his own. To accompany his aikido he has created his own weapons exercises, among these a series of iaido-inspired sword work called aikibatto.

He is a member of the grading committee of Aikikai in Sweden, and on the boards of the International Aikido Federation (IAF) and the Swedish federation for budo and martial arts (Svenska Budo- och Kampsportsförbundet). He also was the chairman of Swedish aikido for a couple of years.

As a novelist, Stenudd made his debut in 1979 with the novel Om om. After that he has published a series of novels as well as books on astrology and Swedish interpretations of the Chinese book of wisdom Tao Te Ching and the famous samurai Miyamoto Musashi's book on military strategy, The Book of Five Rings. His book on aikido is the most extensive book on the art in Swedish. In 2008 his own translation of it into English was published. He also is a graduate student at the Lund university in the history of ideas, and has his own publishing house Arriba that mainly but not only publishes his own books.

== Bibliography ==
- Stenudd, S: Aikido - den fredliga kampkonsten (literally "Aikido - the peaceful martial art"). Arriba 1998, ISBN 91-7894-018-4
- Stenudd, Stefan (2008). Life Energy Encyclopedia: Qi, Prana, Spirit, and Other Life Forces around the World. BookSurge. ISBN 1-4392-0068-8.
- Stenudd, Stefan (2008). Aikido: The Peaceful Martial Art. BookSurge. ISBN 1-4196-5879-4.
- Stenudd, Stefan (2008). Qi: Increase your Life Energy. BookSurge. ISBN 1-4196-2772-4.
- Stenudd, Stefan (2007). Aikibatto: Sword Exercises for Aikido Students. BookSurge. ISBN 1-4196-5878-6.
- Stenudd, Stefan (2007). Cosmos of the Ancients: The Greek Philosophers on Myth and Cosmology. BookSurge. ISBN 1-4196-2773-2.
- Stenudd, Stefan (2008). All's End. BookSurge. ISBN 1-4196-5285-0.
- Stenudd, Stefan (2006). Murder. BookSurge. ISBN 1-4196-5186-2.
