= André Nocquet =

French aikido teacher (1914–1999)

André Nocquet (30 July 1914 – 12 March 1999) was a French aikido teacher holding the rank of 8th dan. He was one of the very earliest non-Japanese to practice the art.

== Early life ==
Nocquet studied Greco-Roman wrestling as a young man. He began the practice of Jujutsu in 1937 with Israeli professor Moshé Feldenkrais. Later Mikinosuke Kawaishi came to Feldenkrais's dojo to teach and Nocquet became Kawaishi’s student.

== Aikido career ==
In 1954, Nocquet was encouraged by Tadashi Abe to travel to Japan to see Morihei Ueshiba and study at the Aikikai Hombu Dojo. Nocquet stayed for nearly three years (1955–57), living in the dojo; he was one of only two non-Japanese to enjoy this privilege during that early era, the other being subsequently Terry Dobson. This was a difficult time for him as a westerner as there were virtually no other non-Japanese practicing aikido at the time.

During Nocquet's initial time at Hombu, he was the only uchi-deshi. Later Nobuyoshi Tamura and Masamichi Noro took up residence there. Nocquet and Tamura, both of whom held the rank of first dan at the time, trained extensively together.

He returned to France in the summer of 1958. He practiced alongside Tadashi Abe when the latter came to France. In 1959-1960 Abe returned to Japan, leaving Nocquet to teach aikido in France. Nocquet received the rank of 8th dan in 1985, from his French Aikido federation.

Nocquet founded the Groupe Historique Aikido André Nocquet (GHAAN) in 1988 within the Fédération Française d'Aïkido et Budo (FFAB) headed by Tamura Sensei. This structure gave him the possibility to teach autonomously while participating in the technical organization of the FFAB. After his death, Nocquet left the technical direction of his group to his four most advanced students (sixth dan) Jo Cardot †, Claude Gentil, Claude Cébille and Hervé Dizien.

== Writings ==
- O'Sensei Morihei Ueshiba: Presence and Message (1975) – Originally published in French in 1975 as Présence et Message and translated into English by Robert Cornman at the author's request, subsequently published in 1994 (private edition), and in 2016 (Amazon). A collection of reflections on the philosophy of the founder of aikido together with some 80 photos of Morihei Ueshiba, Kisshomaru Ueshiba, Koichi Tohei, et al.
- Aikido: Heart and Sword (1991) – Originally published in French in 1991 as Le Coeur Épée and subsequently translated to English in 1996 by Aiki News. The author trained extensively in Japan, and this book contains some of his perceptions of the teachings of O'Sensei, and the basis of the spirit of Aikido.
