= International School of Traditional Aikido =

The International School of Traditional Aikido (ISTA) is an umbrella organisation for aikido dojos founded in France by Shihan Alain Peyrache, that allows aikidoka to practice the art of aikido in a traditional way, without the modern changes in martial arts in present days.

== Alain Peyrache ==
Founder of ISTA and EPA (Europe Promotion Aikido). Born in 1950, and started training in aikido by the age of 14 by error - going to a judo dojo only to discover that the class taught at that time was actually aikido. After a few years of practicing aikido under various teachers, Peyrache began training under Nobuyoshi Tamura after he was sent to France by Morihei Ueshiba. At the age of 20 Peyrache was already teaching at his own dojo, and later on he began holding various administrative positions in French aikido organisations, such as the A.C.F.A, U.N.A and the FFLAB.

A few years later, in 1982, Tamura's offers Peyrache to become the head of the National Commission of Ranks, but Peyrache begins to realise that it might not be the correct path for him, and he refuses the job. From this point on, Peyrache starts to build up what would become the EPA, and later on, ISTA, as organisations that restore the traditional art of aikido.

In order to explain his point of view on aikido training, Peyrache is often quoted saying "Aikido can be understood only if one familiarizes himself with the cultural context in which it developed: the tradition and Eastern philosophy ".

== International School of Traditional Aikido ==
The goal of ISTA is to be as faithful as possible to the spirit of OSensei's development of aikido. It is not a distinctive aikido style rather than an umbrella of different dojos with the same goal or common grounds - teaching aikido loyal to the tradition.

The main concept in ISTA is "one master, one dojo" - meaning that there is no superior administration above the dojo cho of the dojo. Each teacher teaches his own Aikido, without standards or limitations. The ISTA allows teachers to run their dojos completely autonomously, and search for their style of aikido along with their students. Granting ranks is also up to the teacher's judgement and nothing or nobody else.

ISTA allows teachers to organise and give seminars nationally or internationally, with Peyrache travelling through ISTA dojos around the world, holding seminars in each country on a yearly basis.

== List of ISTA countries ==
- ISTA Chile
- ISTA France
- ISTA Italy
- ISTA Belgium
- ISTA Switzerland
- ISTA Netherlands
- ISTA Spain
- ISTA Greece
- ISTA Canada
- ISTA Israel
- ISTA Haiti
- ISRA Russia
- ISTA Egypt
- ISTA Portugal
