= 五十嵐 =

五十嵐, meaning 'fifty storms', may refer to:

- 50 Lan, a Taiwanese bubble tea Chain
- Igarashi, a Japanese surname
