= Seiichi Sugano =

Japanese Aikidoka

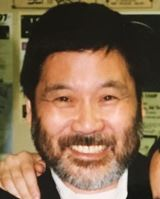
- Born: 17 December 1939; Otaru, Hokkaido
- Died: 29 August 2010 (aged 70); New York City, New York
- Native name: 菅野誠 Sugano, Seiichi
- Nationality: Japanese
- Style: Aikido
- Teachers: Morihei Ueshiba, Kisshomaru Ueshiba
- Rank: 8th Dan

Seiichi Sugano (菅野誠一 17 December 1939 – 29 August 2010) was a Japanese Aikido teacher who lived and taught in many Western countries. He held the rank of an 8th dan Aikikai.

== Life ==
Sugano was born in Otaru, Hokkaido. Sugano’s family was of samurai lineage, with his father being a Major in the Japanese Imperial Marines during WWII. Sugano stated that his earliest memory was of his father cleaning his sword on leave from the war. From this he grew up training in martial arts from an early age, training with bokken and wrestling. Sugano entered the Aikikai Hombu Dojo in 1957 and by 1959 was an Uchi-deshi of Morihei Ueshiba living at the main school. In 1965 he was appointed by Ueshiba to introduce aikido in Australia. He remained there for 15 years, founding the organization Aiki Kai Australia. At the request of Nobuyoshi Tamura, Sugano went to Europe, living and teaching in Belgium while instructing in Luxembourg, France and other European countries. In 1988 he moved to New York City where he co-instructed with Yoshimitsu Yamada at the New York Aikikai. From 1988 onward Sugano's primary instruction was at New York Aikikai teaching over 200 classes a year there, despite a grueling travel schedule. Due to Yamada's strong dislike of weapons Sugano mainly taught body arts and tanto instruction at New York Aikikai, emphasizing a joyful, spontaneous and strongly physical practice. While always stating, "Aikido is not martial art" Sugano strongly emphasized atemi and martial application in technical application in his New York instruction.

Sugano maintained regular contact with the Aikikai Hombu Dojo and also the Ueshiba family. He traveled extensively during the year to give aikido seminars, mainly in Europe and South East Asia. He visited Australia twice yearly and Malaysia once yearly to conduct the National Training Schools and dan grading. Sugano's aikido was known for possessing both speed and power. His teaching emphasized timing and distance, within a fundamental study of basic technique. Weapons instruction followed a more organic style, with very little study of formal kata. Sugano's weapons instruction focused on correct body positioning (hanmi) and paired practice, which again emphasized the necessity of timing and distance.

In 2003, Sugano suffered a below the knee amputation, but he continued to teach and demonstrate aikido without any severe limitation. A medical fund was set up to cover his ongoing medical costs.

Sugano died in New York City on August 29, 2010.

== Legacy ==
The Foundation he established in Australia prior to his death, continues to promote Sugano's aikido legacy internationally.

Three of Sugano's students were promoted to 7th dan on his recommendation: Tony Smibert (Tasmania), Robert Botterill (Melbourne) and Hanan Janiv (Canberra). They had also been awarded the title of Shihan.

== Aikido Moral Code ==
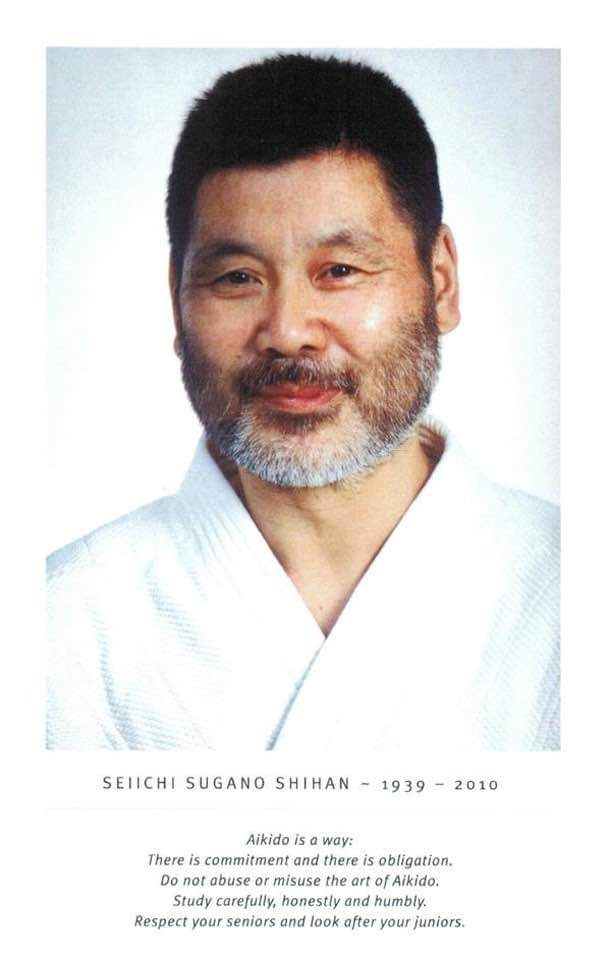
Sugano Sensei Memorial Photo

Sugano Sensei wrote the Aikido Moral Code for students and schools that follow his teaching:

Aikido is a Way.

There is commitment and there is obligation.

Do not abuse or misuse the art of Aikido.

Study carefully, honestly and humbly.

Respect your seniors

Take care of your juniors.

== Quotes ==
"Philosophy of Aikido is love... To tell is OK but have to act. If you train you must give yourself... We must help others around."

"Aikido is a circle that is large and holds many things. If you point to one place in the circle and say ‘this is the circle’ you are not correct. The moment you do this you see only one point and there is no circle. Aikido is more than martial art. More. Aikido can be used as a martial art. All this requires is the mind of violence. But that does not mean it is Aikido."

"O’Sensei wanted Uke like water, like air, light and moving. Correct ukemi is to move, be light, in contact with Nage."

== See also ==
- Nobuyoshi Tamura
- Yoshimitsu Yamada
- Kazuo Chiba
- Mitsunari Kanai
- Akira Tohei
