= Aikido Toho Iaido =

Aikido Toho Iaido (Shinjitai: 合気道刀法居合道), sometimes referred as Nishio-ryu Iaido, is a style created by Shoji Nishio, a prolific Aikido practitioner. Its katas consist of 15 katas, most of which correlated to specific Aikido movements. The literal meaning of the name is iaido of Aikido form.

In 1955, due to the lack of explanation regarding sword and jo techniques from Ueshiba (and other instructors), Nishio started study Iaido under Shigenori Sano (10th dan Muso Jikiden Eishin-ryu). He achieved 7th Dan Nihon Zenkoku Iaido Renmei.

In iaido, Nishio practiced number of different styles and consolidated what he believed to be useful. By 2001, after 46 years of learning and perfecting the art, after numerous addition and revision, he finalized his iaido system to 15 katas, most of which correlated to specific Aikido movements.

== List of kata ==
Aiki Toho Iaido consist of 15 katas as follow:

Number	Iaido Form	Kanji	Chiburi	Correspondent Aikido technique
1	Shohatto	初発刀	Eishin Ryu	None
2	Ukenagashi	受け流し	Eishin Ryu	Ikkyo
3	Ushirogiri	後ろ切り	Eishin Ryu	Kaitennage
4	Zengogiri	前後切り	Eishin Ryu	Aihanmi Shihonage
5	Sayugiri	左右切り	Eishin Ryu	Gyakuhanmi Shihonage
6	Tsukaosae	柄押え	Eishin Ryu	Gyakuhanmi Nikkyo
7	Tekubiosae	手首押え	Eishin Ryu	Aihanmi Nikkyo
8	Kawashitsuki	かわし突き	Eishin Ryu	Tsuki Sankyo
9	Tsukekomi	付け込み	Katori Ryu	Tsuki Kotegaeshi
10	Tsume	詰 め	Katori Ryu	Iriminage
11	Sanpo	三 方	Katori Ryu	Sankyo
12	Shiho	四 方	Suiou Ryu	Shomen uchi, Yokomen uchi Shihonage
13	Nukiawase	抜き合わせ	Suiou Ryu	Shomen uchi, Yokomen uchi Gokyo
14	Todome	とどめ	Eishin Ryu	Yonkyo
15	Suemonogiri	据 物	Eishin Ryu	None

The official kata system also contain 5 katas from Shin Toho.
