= Toshikazu Ichimura =

Japanese aikido teacher (born 1941)

Toshikazu Ichimura (born December 12, 1941) is a Japanese aikido teacher who lived in Sweden from 1966 to 1986, and was the teacher responsible for aikido in Sweden during this time. He also was the responsible teacher in Denmark and in Finland, had importance for the development of iaido in these three countries, and was the first to give aikido demonstrations in Finland. Ichimura holds 6th dan in the aikido organisation Aikikai, a rank he received in 1977, and 6th dan renshi in iaido since 1969. Besides, and in connection to, his teaching in Japanese martial arts he also taught macrobiotics and the Japanese system of sound mysticism, kototama.

== Personal history ==
Ichimura started in aikido in 1957, at Aikikai Hombu dojo in Tokyo with Shoji Nishio as his main teacher. In 1961 he went to the Toyo University, where he started a university dojo. In 1966 he moved to Stockholm, since Jan Beime and a few other people had asked Hombu to send an aikido teacher there. To start with Ichimura was based in Beime's dojo, Stockholm Aikikai, and later at Minnano. He also travelled, teaching in many different dojos in the Stockholm area. In 1968 he moved to Uppsala, roughly 70 kilometres north of Stockholm, where he started a new dojo in cooperation with the local YMCA. The dojo has since changed name, and is nowadays often referred to as Uppsala Aikikai. In the years to come Ichimura taught in Uppsala as well as in Stockholm and other places in Sweden, and also taught seminars in Finland, Denmark and Poland.

== Legacy ==
Among the traces he left in Swedish aikido are a connection between aikido and iaido; most of the older aikido practitioners in the country have done also iaido. The part of Scandinavian aikido who do Nishio's type of aikido originally had this connection from Ichimura. Ichimura also wrote two of the first aikido books in Swedish, Aikido and Aikido och fred (literally "Aikido and peace").

In 1986, Ichimura returned to Japan, leaving Sweden without a Japanese teacher in charge while Yasuo Kobayashi took responsibility for Finland, and Nishio for Denmark. Ichimura no longer does aikido, but has a shiatsu clinic in Kobe. However, in connection with the 50 years jubilee in 2011 for aikido in Sweden, Ichimura made a temporary comeback. At the jubilee training camp in Stockholm in September he instructed on a training session and terminated the performance session during the camp.
