= Pierre Chassang =

French aikidoka (1919–2013)

Pierre Chassang (1919 – 29 April 2013) was a French aikidoka holding 8th dan Takemusu Aiki Intercontinental and 6th dan Aikikai.

A member of the Free French Forces during World War II, Chassang saw military service in North Africa, Italy and his native France.

Chassang was first taught aikido by Tadashi Abe in 1952. When Abe returned to Japan in 1960, Chassang helped Masamichi Noro to create the Association Culturelle Européenne d'Aikido. He subsequently studied with Mutsuro Nakazono and Nobuyoshi Tamura, with whom he had a long and close alliance.

Chassang was a founding member of the International Aikido Federation, which he served as General Treasurer for several years. He was President of European Aikido Federation from 1981 to 1987. With Philippe Voarino, he also founded the Takemusu Aiki Intercontinental association.

Chassang died in April 2013, at the age of 94. Aikido Arma di Taggia Bushido Ryu has dedicated the dojo to him in 2018 (Giuseppe Annovazzi is the Dojo Cho).

At the end of his life Pierre Chassang wrote a Book about Aikido that has been published privately: "Aikido – Dis-nous c'è que tu Sais!". This book was translated into English with the author's permission as "Aikido – Tell us what you know!" by Paul Mitton of Furo Ryu Aikido in Bath, England. The book was also translated in Italian with the author's permissione as "Aikido - Dicci ciò che sai!" by Andrea Anzalone e Massimo Salvó.
