= Strozzi Institute =

- Formation: 1985
- Founder: Richard Strozzi-Heckler
- Location: Oakland, California, United States

Strozzi Institute is an organization located in Oakland, California that offers coaching services and trainings in leadership, organizational development, and personal mastery. It uses a somatic approach to learning. Programs are offered primarily at the institute's Sonoma training center.

== History ==
Strozzi Institute was founded in 1985 by Richard Strozzi-Heckler, Ph.D. as an application of his research into a "somatic philosophy of learning".

In the 1970s Strozzi-Heckler and Robert K. Hall, M.D. developed The Lomi School of body oriented psychotherapy, influenced by the work of Fritz Perls, Ida Rolf, Randolph Stone, and Charan Singh. In addition to the usual psychiatric and psychoanalytic methods, this program includes touch, group process, breathwork, attention training, and movement to its approach, to provide its framework for working with the mind unified with the physical body.

In 1985 Strozzi-Heckler contributed to a pilot program for the U.S. Army Special Forces to evaluate mind-body approaches to military training. In addition to many of the measured outcomes related to increased endurance, alertness, capacity for stress management, and team cohesion, participants unexpectedly demonstrated significant increases in leadership characteristics. Reflecting on this, Strozzi-Heckler began exploring ways to adapt the program for leaders in business and government. In collaboration with Fernando Flores during the 1980s and 1990s, Flores's Ontology of Language research into speech acts was integrated and applied to the somatic leadership domain.

In 2000, Strozzi Institute introduced a training program for coaches interested in their somatic approach.

== Strozzi Somatics ==
The Strozzi Institute methodology, known as Strozzi Somatics, is used one-on-one and in groups of varying size.

The Strozzi Somatics methodology makes a distinction between soma - the living body in its entirety, and the mechanistic view of the physical body as an assemblage of anatomical parts. Using this first definition the body is regarded as the primary domain of feeling, action, language, and meaning. From this perspective, coaches observe the ways people hold their bodies and how they respond to stress situations, such as verbal or physical surprises. The body’s overall organization in this way is referred to as a somatic shape. Each person’s unique somatic shape is formed by responses to past experiences, positive and negative, which are established as deep, mostly unconscious patterns of muscular activity in the body. Over time these patterns produce conditioned tendencies of reaction to people, situations and environments.

Strozzi-Heckler has described the process in which, when an individual is exposed to a stressful stimulus, they revert to this conditioned tendency, limiting their available choices for action. Withdrawal, fear, attempting to dominate, rigidity, and over-accommodation are examples of different conditioned tendency shapes. Because this is a somatic event rather than an exclusively cognitive one, new information or theoretical insight will not shift the response. As an illustration, he describes a team leader who has extensive education in management principles but, especially under stress, comports himself in a way that produces mistrust and resentment from the people he manages, eventually creating significant breakdowns within his team.

=== Leadership ===
Strozzi Institute has stressed that leadership characteristics often considered innate are teachable, and can be improved with practice. These traits include: high self awareness and awareness of the environment, being open to possibilities rather than limited to past options, being motivated by a connection to what one cares about, the ability to deal directly with matters that need attention, directing attention outward in a way that enables listening and connection with others, and the ability to coordinate with others and empathize with their concerns.

=== Aikido Influence ===
Many of the practices taught are adapted from aikido and different forms of meditation. Aikido movements are presented in a non-martial context and principles of the art such as: centering oneself, facing an attack, extending outward into the environment, entering into shared space, and blending with the momentum of an incursion, are used as physical metaphors to guide the practice of embodying leadership characteristics. An aikido dojo, Two Rock Aikido, is located on the Strozzi Institute site in Sonoma.

=== Strozzi Bodywork ===
Working from the premise that the body and the self are indistinguishable from one another, Strozzi Institute offers training in a style of bodywork developed by Strozzi-Heckler and Hall to produce change in a person's core historical limitations. Strozzi Bodywork involves addressing deeply held muscular contractions (also known as armoring) maintained in the soma using touch, breath, and directed attention. Practitioners train to develop an empathetic, compassionate presence that can build trust and enable them to work with others through a variety of emotional states. Some somatic coaches use Strozzi Bodywork in their coaching sessions.

=== Applications ===
The Strozzi Somatics methodology has been applied to a broad range of organizations and with diverse populations. These include Fortune 50 companies, U.S. Navy SEALs, U.S. Marines, law enforcement agencies, social justice groups, professional sports teams, as well as urban gang members, prisoners, Olympic athletes, and survivors of sexual trauma.

Strozzi Institute has contributed to U.S. Military counter-insurgency training, integrating somatic practices to enhance soldiers' abilities to connect with others across cultures rather than rely predominantly on force. Strozzi-Heckler has said, "Working with the body gives you a way to do that because it transcends words and language. It takes us to that common core of being human."
