= Richard Strozzi-Heckler =

American author, coach, and aikidoka

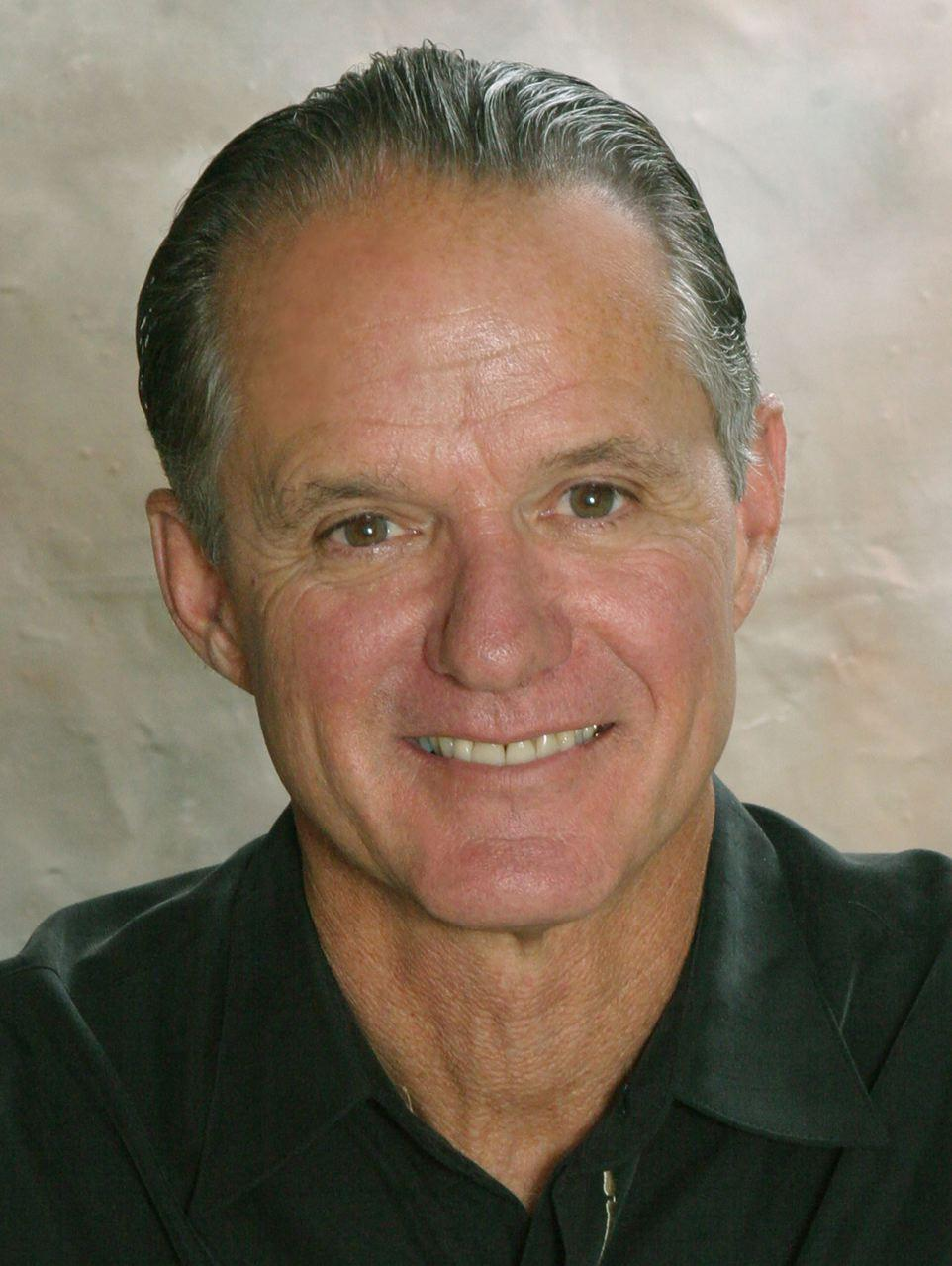
- Born: 1944 (age 81–82)
- Education: San Diego State University; Saybrook University
- Organization: Strozzi Institute
- Known for: Somatics, leadership development, aikido
- Website: strozziinstitute.org

Richard Strozzi-Heckler (born 1944) is an American author, coach, and psychologist who integrates somatics and aikido into leadership development. He is the founder of the Strozzi Institute and holds a seventh-degree black belt in aikido.

== Biography ==
=== Early life and education ===
Strozzi-Heckler spent his early life in a military family, periodically moving to different naval bases. In early adolescence, he began studying martial arts, beginning with judo, then karate, and jiujitsu. He excelled in athletics while in high school and was awarded a scholarship to San Diego State College in San Diego, California, where he was named All-American in track and field.

After a Marine Corps tour of duty in the mid-1960s, Strozzi-Heckler traveled throughout Asia studying yoga and meditation. He returned to the United States, eventually earning a Ph.D. in clinical psychology from Saybrook University with an emphasis on the mind-body connection.

=== Aikido training ===
Strozzi-Heckler studied aikido under Robert Nadeau Shihan. He holds a seventh-degree black belt in aikido. In January 2020, he was awarded Shihan by the International Aikido Headquarters in Tokyo, Japan.

=== Career ===
Strozzi-Heckler co-founded the Lomi School in 1970 with Robert K. Hall, Alyssa Hall, and Catherine Flaxman, integrating aikido and bodywork principles into a body-oriented psychotherapy called Lomi Work. His early thinking on the relationship between aikido, somatics, and human potential is reflected in his edited collection Aikido and the New Warrior.

In 1976, Strozzi-Heckler, together with George Leonard and Wendy Palmer, established the Aikido of Tamalpais dojo in Mill Valley, California.

In 1985, he was invited to contribute to a US Army Special Forces project designed to test the effectiveness of integrating various practices into its training program. During the six-month program, he taught aikido and meditation techniques to a group of Green Berets, an experience he later chronicled in In Search of the Warrior Spirit.

In 1986, he moved to rural Sonoma County, California outside of Petaluma, and developed the Strozzi Somatics methodology, aimed at applying principles from the Army project to individuals and civilian organizations.

Strozzi-Heckler helped design and implement the Marine Corps Martial Arts Program.

== Philosophy ==
Strozzi-Heckler argues that a person's thoughts and mood are reflected in observable physical attributes such as posture, facial expression, and tone of voice, and that congruency between these elements and a person's words is a primary characteristic of effective leadership. He holds that this congruency can be practiced and developed systematically, in the same way as skill in a martial art or musical instrument.

The Strozzi Somatics methodology involves identifying an individual or organization's core values and introducing practices that combine conceptual understanding with physical activity to develop behavioral traits aligned with those values. Many of these practices draw on aikido movements or principles. Strozzi- Heckler describes the body as the primary site of transformation, arguing that sustainable change in behavior requires dissolving habituated patterns held at the level of the musculature, organs, and nervous system — an approach he details in The Art of Somatic Coaching. The methodology has been applied in corporate and military leadership contexts as well as law enforcement, corrections, athletics, education, politics, social justice, and health.

== Books ==
- Strozzi-Heckler, Richard, ed. (1993). Aikido and the New Warrior. North Atlantic Books. ISBN 978-0-938190-51-6.
- Strozzi-Heckler, Richard (2007). In Search of the Warrior Spirit: Teaching Awareness Disciplines to the Green Berets (4th ed.). Blue Snake Books. ISBN 9781583942024.
- Strozzi-Heckler, Richard (1997). The Anatomy of Change. North Atlantic Books. ISBN 978-1-55643-147-0.
- Strozzi-Heckler, Richard (1997). Holding the Center. Frog Books. ISBN 978-1-883319-54-0.
- Strozzi-Heckler, Richard (2003). Being Human at Work: Bringing Somatic Intelligence Into Your Professional Life. North Atlantic Books. ISBN 978-1-55643-447-1.
- Strozzi-Heckler, Richard (2007). The Leadership Dojo. Frog Books. ISBN 978-1-58394-201-7.
- Strozzi-Heckler, Richard (2014). The Art of Somatic Coaching: Embodying Skillful Action, Wisdom, and Compassion. North Atlantic Books. ISBN 9781583946732.
- Strozzi-Heckler, Richard (2022). Embodying the Mystery: Somatic Wisdom for Emotional, Energetic, and Spiritual Awakening. Inner Traditions/Bear. ISBN 9781623176099.
