= Tony Smibert =

Australian artist (born 1949)

Tony Smibert AM
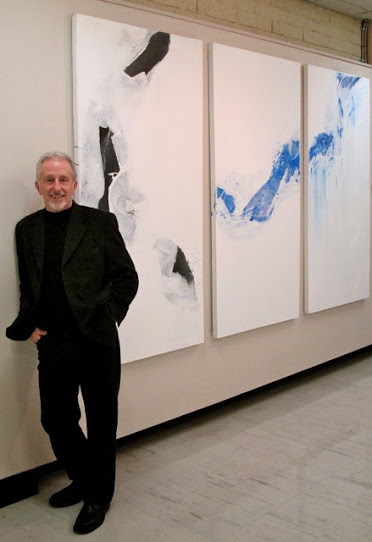
- Born: Anthony Charles Smibert; 8 January 1949 (age 77); Melbourne, Victoria
- Education: National Gallery of Victoria Art School, Melbourne State College
- Known for: Painter
- Movement: Independent
- Website: smibert.com

Anthony Charles Smibert AM (born 1949 in Melbourne) is an artist and aikido teacher. He has exhibited artworks and published research internationally, much of the latter on the methods of 19th-century watercolourist J. M. W. Turner. He is the president of Aiki Kai Australia and a member of the senior council of the International Aikido Federation. In the Queen's Birthday Honours in June 2016, Smibert was appointed a Member of the Order of Australia (AM) "for significant service to aikido through a range of roles, and to the visual arts as a painter and water colourist". His home, studio and gallery are in Deloraine, Tasmania.

== Art ==
Smibert's art reflects three diverse streams of thought: Japanese minimalism, the early 19th century English School of Painting and Abstract Expressionism. He has been recognised as one of Australia's leading watercolourists. His 1993 collaboration with Japanese couturier Yasuhiro Chiji led to a signature range of high fashion, yūzen kimono based on Smibert's watercolours. Some works (for example his Yosemite Valley watercolours and acrylics) are clearly inspired by the study of Turner, Caspar David Friedrich and the early 19th century philosophy known as the Sublime. For Australian landscapes Smibert sometimes uses local iron ore as pigment. Smibert's art is deeply informed by his study in aikido. His larger acrylic abstracts use the energy flow ('ki') of aikido to create a broad calligraphy reminiscent of Franz Kline and Action Painting. Smibert's career includes exhibitions in Europe, South East Asia, Japan, the Americas and Australia.

Examples of Smibert's Turner-influenced, minimalist and abstract painting styles, respectively, are shown below:

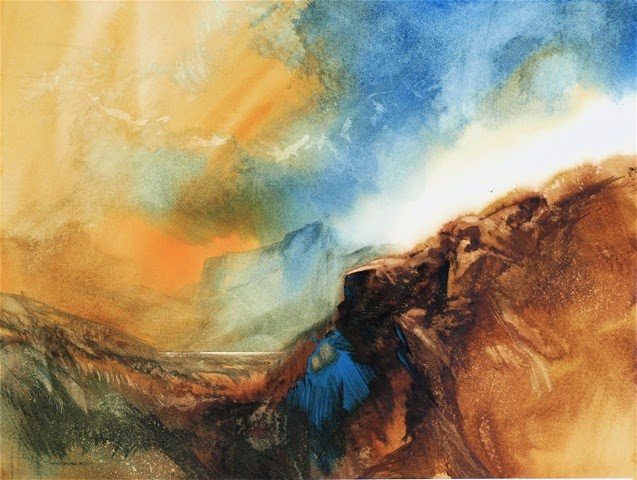
Play of Light, Watercolour on paper, Original size 380 x 290mm

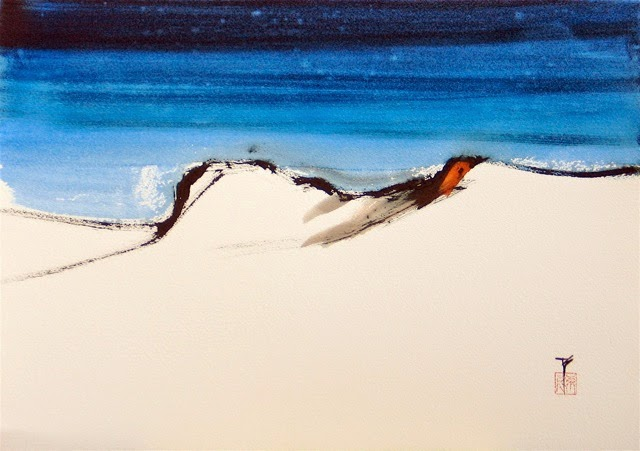
Winter, Watercolour on paper, Original size 300 x 410m

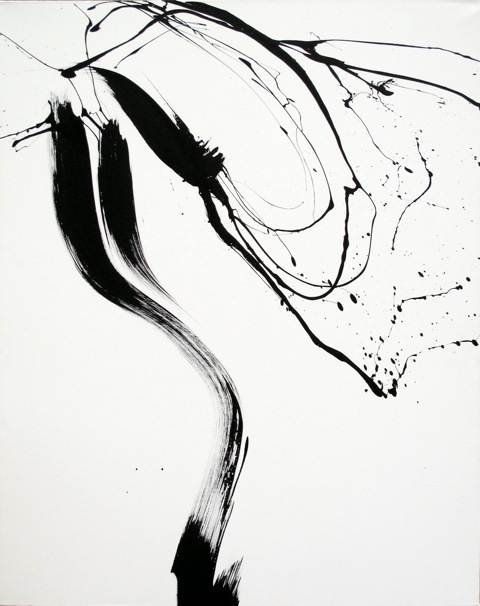
Flying White 1, Acrylic on canvas, Original size 1230 x 1530mm

== Aikido ==
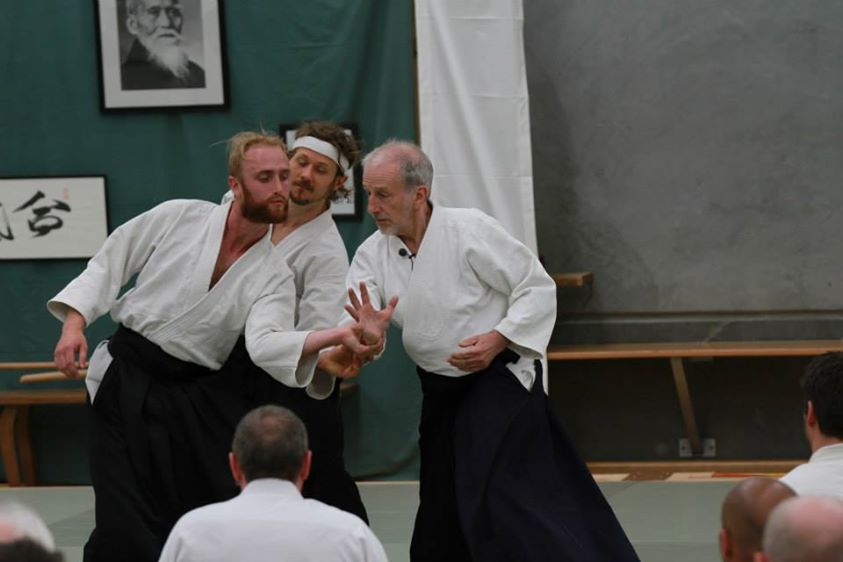
Tony Smibert teaching aikido at Aiki Kai Australia's Summer School 2014 in Melbourne, Victoria

Smibert commenced judo in his early teens and then aikido in 1964 at age 15. He became a student of aikido master Seiichi Sugano in 1965 and remained his student until Sugano's death in 2010. Smibert assisted Sugano to establish in Aikido in Victoria then worked closely with other senior students to establish Aiki Kai Australia and the Aikido Foundation. Smibert was Vice-President of Aiki Kai Australia from 1976 until 2010. On the death of Sugano he was elected president. Smibert is a trustee of the Aikido Foundation, established to promote the aikido legacy of Sugano, along with senior Australian instructors Robert Botterill (7th dan) and Hanan Janiv (7th dan).

Tony Smibert represented Australia at the International Aikido Federation (IAF) from 1980 to 1984. He was then elected IAF vice-chairman, a position he then held from 1984 to 2008. In 2008 he was appointed by the current Aikido Doshu Moriteru Ueshiba to membership of the Senior Council of the IAF.

Smibert currently holds the rank of 8th dan Aikikai and the teaching title of shihan from Aikido World Headquarters in Japan. He regularly teaches in Australia and Continental Europe and has also taught in Japan, South East Asia, the USA, Russia and the United Kingdom.

== Education and publishing ==
Smibert's publications include The Watercolour Apprentice, The Inner Art of Watercolour, The Watercolour Road, and other series for Australian Artist and International Artist magazines; and occasional articles for Craft Arts International and Australian Art Review magazines. In the early 1990s he published a series of video lessons based on seminars at Mountford Granary Art School in Tasmania followed by an illustrated manual, Painting Landscapes from Your Imagination. Smibert contributed to the Tate publication How to Paint like Turner and co-authored the Tate Watercolour Manual: Lessons from the Great Masters with Tate Senior Conservation Scientist Dr Joyce Townsend.

== Research ==
Concurrent with his own painting, Smibert is a Visiting Artist Researcher at Tate Britain. His interest in the 19th century British painter J. M. W. Turner has taken him to London many times to work directly from Turner's sketchbooks and paintings. Smibert's collaboration with Dr Joyce Townsend has included using watercolour pigments from Turner's studio to recreate the methods of Turner and building an extensive collection of historic artist materials and watercolour boxes from the 18th, 19th and 20th centuries. Smibert's research includes visiting precise locations where Turner had worked around Britain and Europe and comparing them to the artist's original drawings and colour studies towards a practical understanding of Turner's creative processes. Smibert has demonstrated Turner's techniques on BBCTV's Fake or Fortune programme and delivered master classes and workshops for curators and artists at art museums including the Tate, the National Gallery of Australia, National Gallery of Victoria and Art Gallery of South Australia. In 2013 he and pianist Ambre Hammond created a public performance Turner and the Sublime to bring Turner and this research to life for audiences at the National Gallery of Australia and the Art Gallery of South Australia as part of the Turner at the Tate: The Making of a Master exhibition.

== Gallery ==
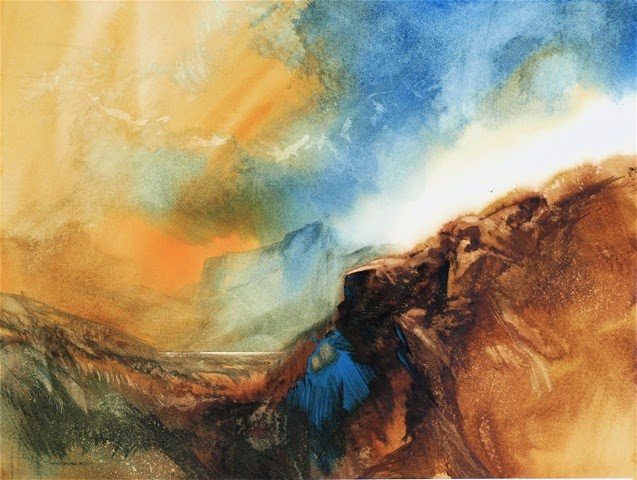

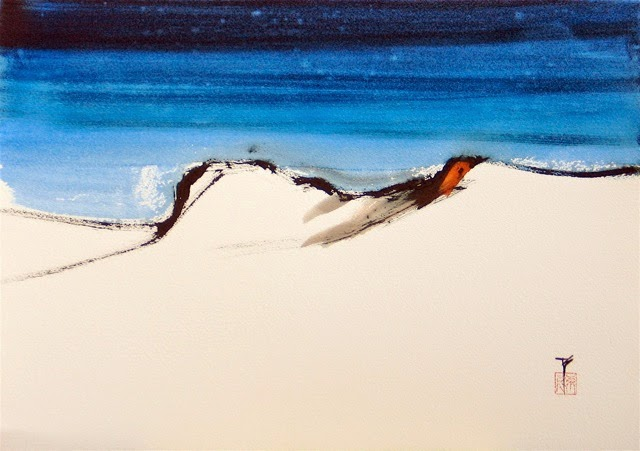

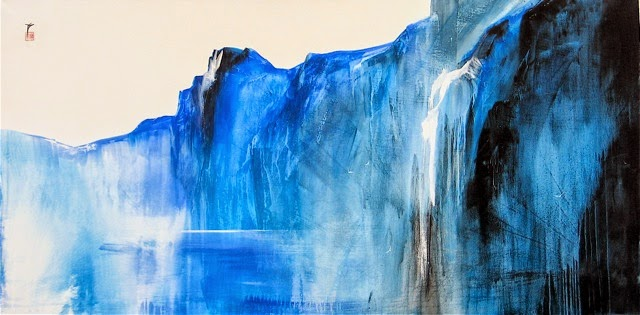

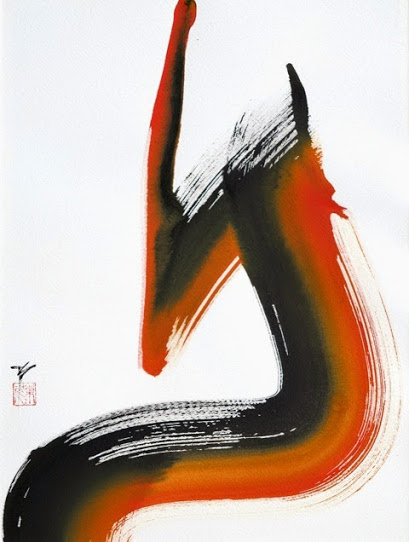

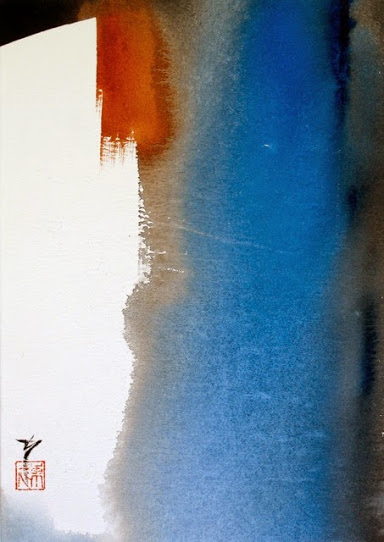

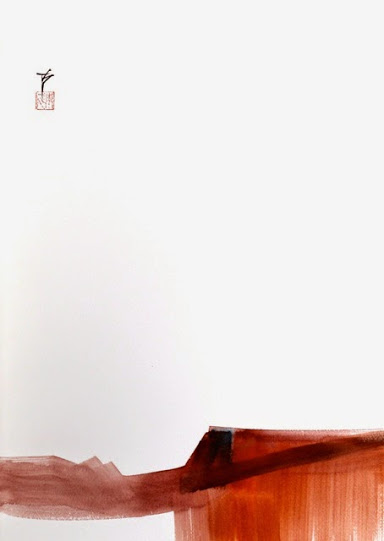

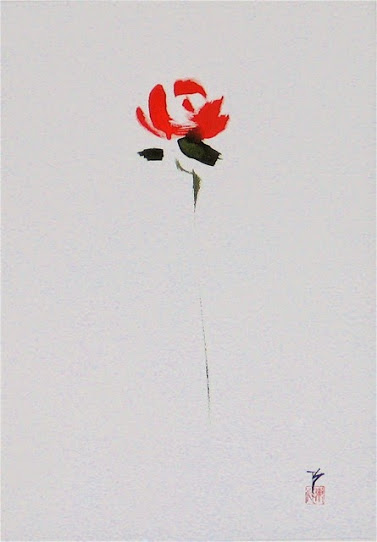

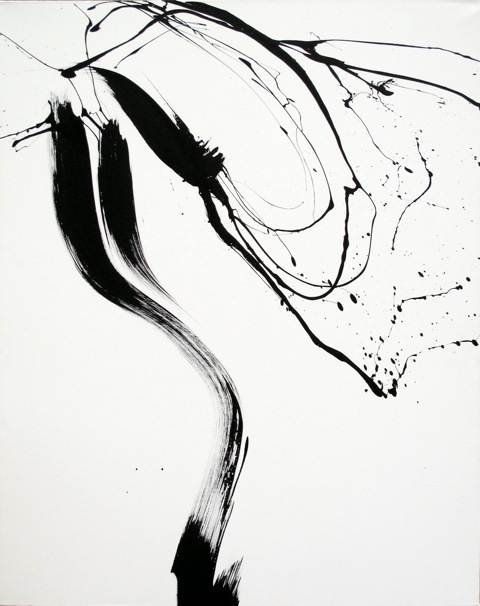

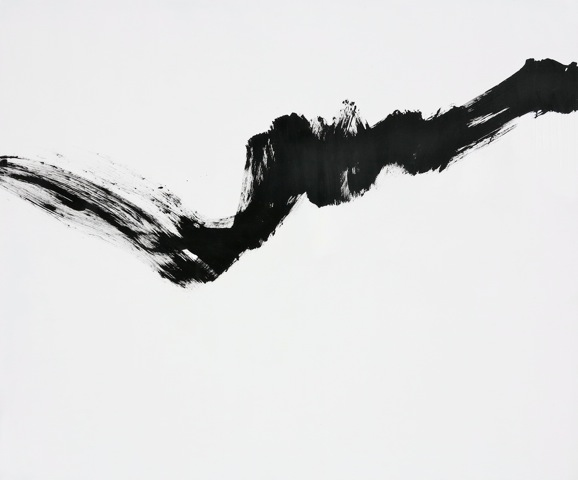

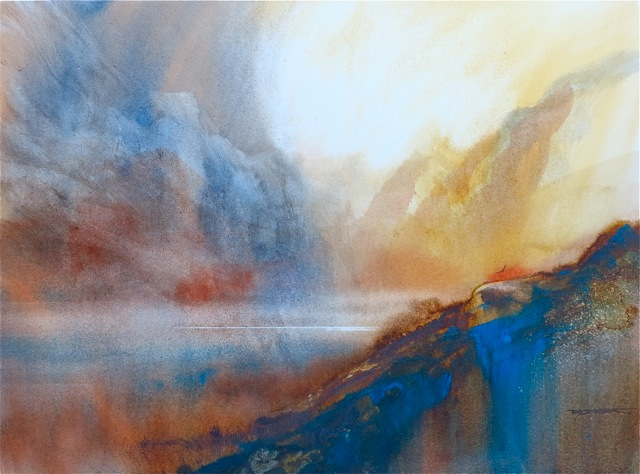
