= Loi Lee =

Loi Lee is a practitioner of the martial art of Tomiki Aikido and the first woman outside the borders of Japan to obtain 7th dan in the Tomiki system. She trained with both Kenji Tomiki and Hideo Ohba. She is a doctor of medicine and is also an acupuncturist.

She has a 7th dan in both iaido and jōdō awarded by the all Japan Kendo Federation (Zen Nihon Kendo Renmei).
