= Kazuo Igarashi =

Japanese aikido teacher

Kazuo Igarashi (五十嵐 和男 いがらし かずお born March 24, 1946) is a Japanese aikido teacher who presently holds the rank of 8th dan Aikikai.

Born in Niigata he entered Yasuo Kobayashi's dojo as an uchideshi in 1973 and from 1978 has taught a few seminars per year in Sweden, Finland, Canada, EE.UU., Hawaii, Russia, Helsinki, Korea, Greece, England. In 1983 he established the Aikido Hashimo Dojo in Hashimoto. Igarashi teaches at eight dojo in the Kantō area.

These are : 1. The main Dojo at Hashimoto, Midori-ku, Sagamihara-shi, Kanagawa, established in February, 1983 2. Hachioji Dojo, Hachioji-shi, Tokyo 3. Motosumiyoshi Dojo, Kawasaki-shi, Kanagawa 4. Honatsugi Dojo, Atsugi-shi, Kanagawa 5. Umegaoka Dojo, Setagaya-ku, Tokyo

Igarashi Aikido Dojo is represented in South America by Daniel Picciola Aikido Sensei Union Argentina. In Canada, his students operate Calgary Aikikai, where he has regularly taught seminars.
