= Yoshimitsu Yamada =

Japanese aikido teacher (1938–2023)

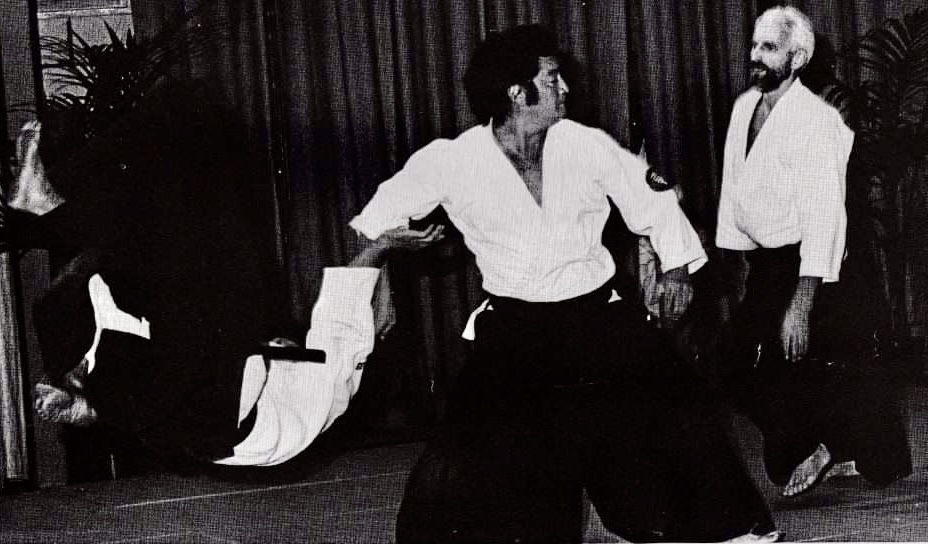
- Yamada Sensei in Belgium
- Born: February 17, 1938; Tokyo, Japan
- Died: January 15, 2023 (aged 84); New York City, U.S.
- Native name: 山田 嘉光 Yamada Yoshimitsu
- Style: Aikido
- Teachers: Morihei Ueshiba, Tadashi Abe
- Rank: 8th Dan

Yoshimitsu Yamada (山田嘉光, Yamada Yoshimitsu; February 17, 1938 – January 15, 2023) was a Japanese-American aikido teacher. He was ranked eighth dan in the Aikikai. He was chief instructor at the New York Aikikai, and president of the United States Aikido Federation (USAF).

== Life ==
Originally from Tokyo, Japan, Yamada was a graduate of Aoyama Gakuin University. He became interested in aikido through his father's cousin, Tadashi Abe, who trained at the Aikikai Hombu Dojo. He entered Hombu Dojo as an uchi deshi in 1955 at the age of 17. His exposure to westerners and ability to speak English made him a natural choice to teach American soldiers. He first came to the United States in 1964 to do an aikido demonstration at the 1964 World's Fair in New York. In 1966 Yamada and his family hosted Virginia Mayhew, a founding member of New York Aikikai, at his family home in Japan while she studied at Aikikai Hombu dojo. Although the original New York Aikikai was founded in 1961 and led by Yasuo Ohara, in 1964 Yamada was invited by the NY Aikikai board to become chief instructor and the dojo was moved from its 19th Street local to its present location on 18th street in Manhattan. Yamada's success in New York greatly contributed to the expansion of aikido around the world with many instructors leaving to teach in foreign countries thereafter.

In those days there was no other aikido teacher (with the exception of the original NY Aikikai founder Yasuo Ohara) from Japan on the east coast of the US, and Yamada would travel weekly to Boston, with frequent trips to Philadelphia and points south as well. In 1966 some of the burden was relieved when he invited Mitsunari Kanai to take over the small group in Boston. Over time Yamada's students have grown to have students of their own, and have risen to ranks as high as seventh dan. In 1988 Yamada invited Seiichi Sugano to join the dojo, making it one of the few dojos outside Japan with two eighth dans shihan in residence. In 2004 the New York Aikikai celebrated its 40th anniversary with a summer camp at Colgate University with many shihan and Dōshu Moriteru Ueshiba in attendance. Yamada continued to keep an active teaching and travelling schedule, holding seminars in the US as well as Latin America, Russia, France, Germany and other points around the world. In France, he taught at the summer seminar at La Colle-sur-Loup which was organized by his senpai, Nobuyoshi Tamura, and at the summer seminar in Lesneven; both seminars also feature Malcolm Tiki Shewan. In Germany, Yamada taught a summer seminar at Bernau am Chiemsee.

Yamada was well known for his clear and strong basic technique. Beyond his technical ability, he also possessed a gift for passing on his knowledge. His students have become some of the most well-known and high-ranking aikidoka in the Americas. He taught seminars all over the world where thousands of students attended his classes. He was a direct student of the founder of aikido, Morihei Ueshiba, for more than ten years.

Yamada was president of the United States Aikido Federation and chairman of the Latin America Aikido Federation. In January 2011, Yamada accepted an invitation to become the patron of Aikikai Australia. He is the author of the book Aikido Complete, and has made multiple aikido training tapes, including the "Power and the Basics" series, which outlines the requirements for rank testing of all levels.

With the deaths of his colleagues Akira Tohei in 1999, Mitsunari Kanai in 2004, and Seiichi Sugano and Nobuyoshi Tamura in 2010, Yamada was one of the most senior living representatives of the last generation of direct students of Morihei Ueshiba.

In February 2010 Yoshimitsu Yamada founded Aikido Sansuikai International during a seminar in Dominican Republic. Aikido Sansuikai International is an organization recognized by Aikikai Hombu Dojo and has affiliated dojos from Latin America and Europe.

Yamada died in New York City on January 15, 2023, at the age of 84.

== Quotes ==
- "We must keep the spirit of budo no matter how we practice."
- He has been quoted as advising some students at seminars that "Aikido is the way of harmony - but not too much harmony" or to "put harm back in harmony"
