= Ikarashi River =

Coordinates: 37°37′53″N 138°56′51″E

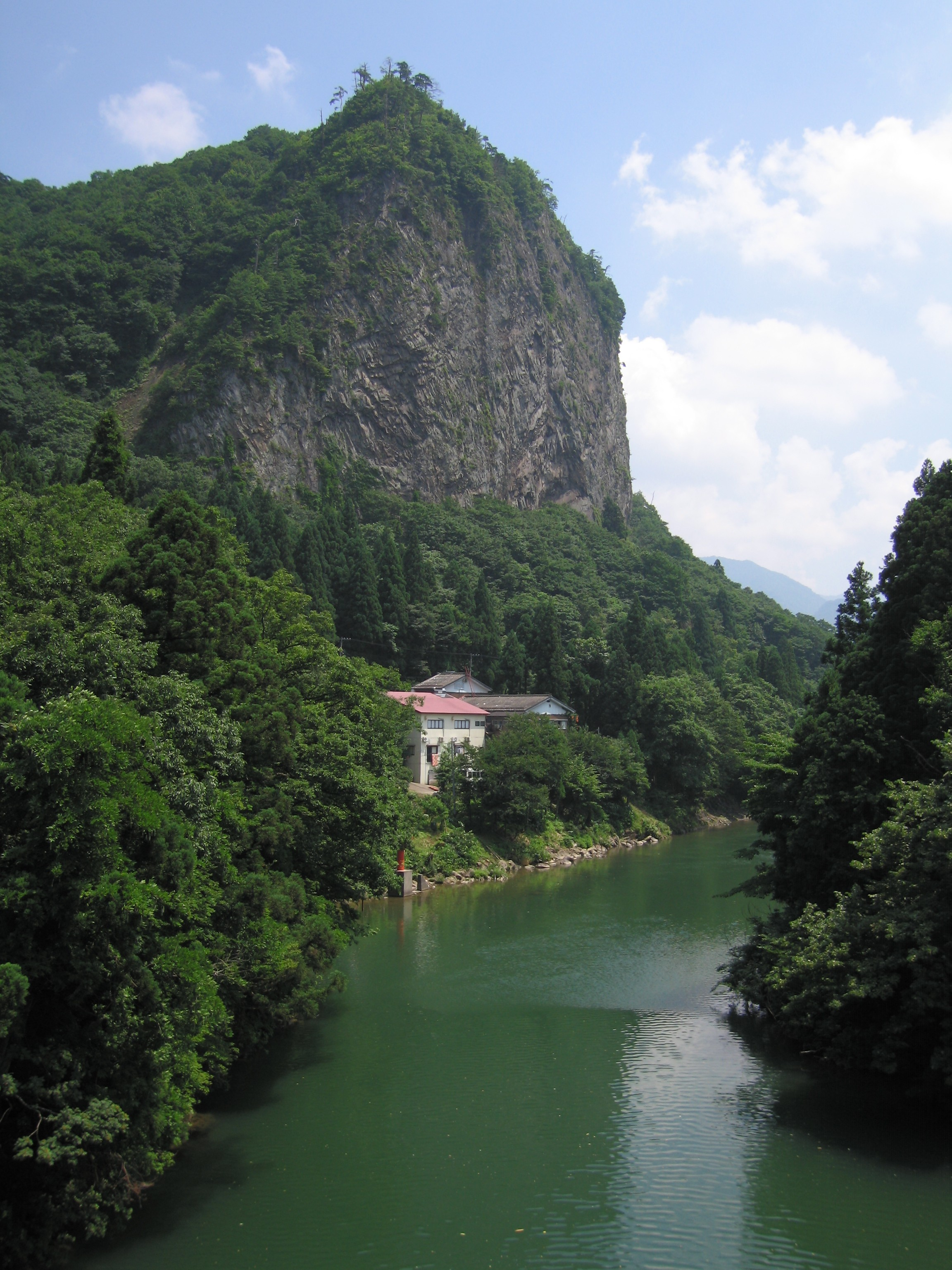
- 八木ヶ鼻, a tourist attraction on the Ikarashi River near Sanjo
- Native name: 五十嵐川 (Japanese)

Location
- Country: Japan
- Prefectures: Niigata

Ikarashi river (五十嵐川, Ikarashigawa) is a river in Niigata Prefecture, Japan. The river flows through the city of Sanjō, Niigata. The Ikarashi is a tributary of the Shinano River.
