= Mitsunari Kanai =

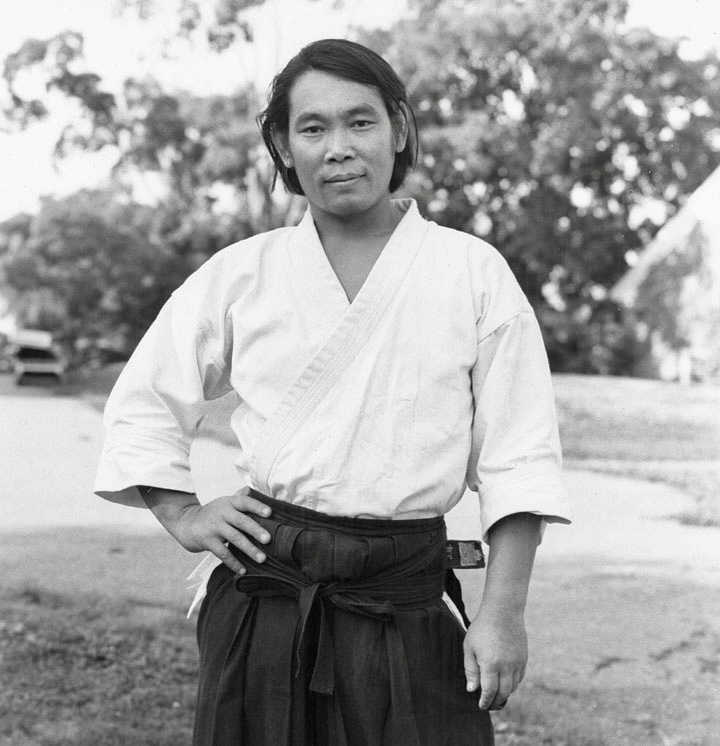
- Mitsunari Kanai
- Born: 1939; Manchukuo
- Died: March 28, 2004 (aged approx. 65); Canada
- Native name: 金井 満也 Kanai Mitsunari
- Style: Aikikai
- Teacher: Morihei Ueshiba
- Rank: 8th Dan

Mitsunari Kanai (1939 – March 28, 2004) was an aikido and iaido teacher born in Japan, who spent most of his teaching career in the United States. He was an 8th dan teacher with the title shihan in the organisation Aikikai.

== Life ==
Kanai Sensei was one of the last group of students of the founder of aikido, Morihei Ueshiba, entering the Hombu Dojo in 1958 as an uchi-deshi. He moved to the United States in 1966 as a 4th dan and subsequently founded the New England Aikikai, currently located off Porter Square in Cambridge, Massachusetts. Kanai was instrumental in the early development of aikido in the United States and Canada, and taught seminars widely throughout the United States, Canada and Europe. He was one of the founders and a Technical Director of both the United States Aikido Federation (USAF) and the CAF.

Kanai Sensei was also skilled in iaido and subsequently taught this art to his senior students, many of whom hold dan rank in both iaido and aikido. He was also highly respected for his metalworking skills and deep historical knowledge of the Japanese sword, the katana, serving at times as a specialist advisor to the East Asian Collection at the nearby Museum of Fine Arts, Boston.

== Legacy ==
In the Boston area, senior students of Kanai Sensei continue to operate New England Aikikai, as well as Framingham Aikikai, Boston Aikikai, and Aikido Tekkojuku of Boston. His students also run university aikido clubs at Harvard University, the Massachusetts Institute of Technology, and Tufts University. Beyond Boston, his students lead dojos in many cities across the US and Canada, including Framingham, Massachusetts;Providence, Rhode Island; Portland, Maine; Portland, Oregon; Toronto, North Vancouver; Raleigh, North Carolina; and Montreal.

== See also ==
- Aikikai
- Aikikai Hombu Dojo

Other USAF Shihan:

- Akira Tohei
- Yoshimitsu Yamada
- Kazuo Chiba
- Seiichi Sugano
