= Nobuyoshi Tamura =

Japanese martial artist (1933–2010)

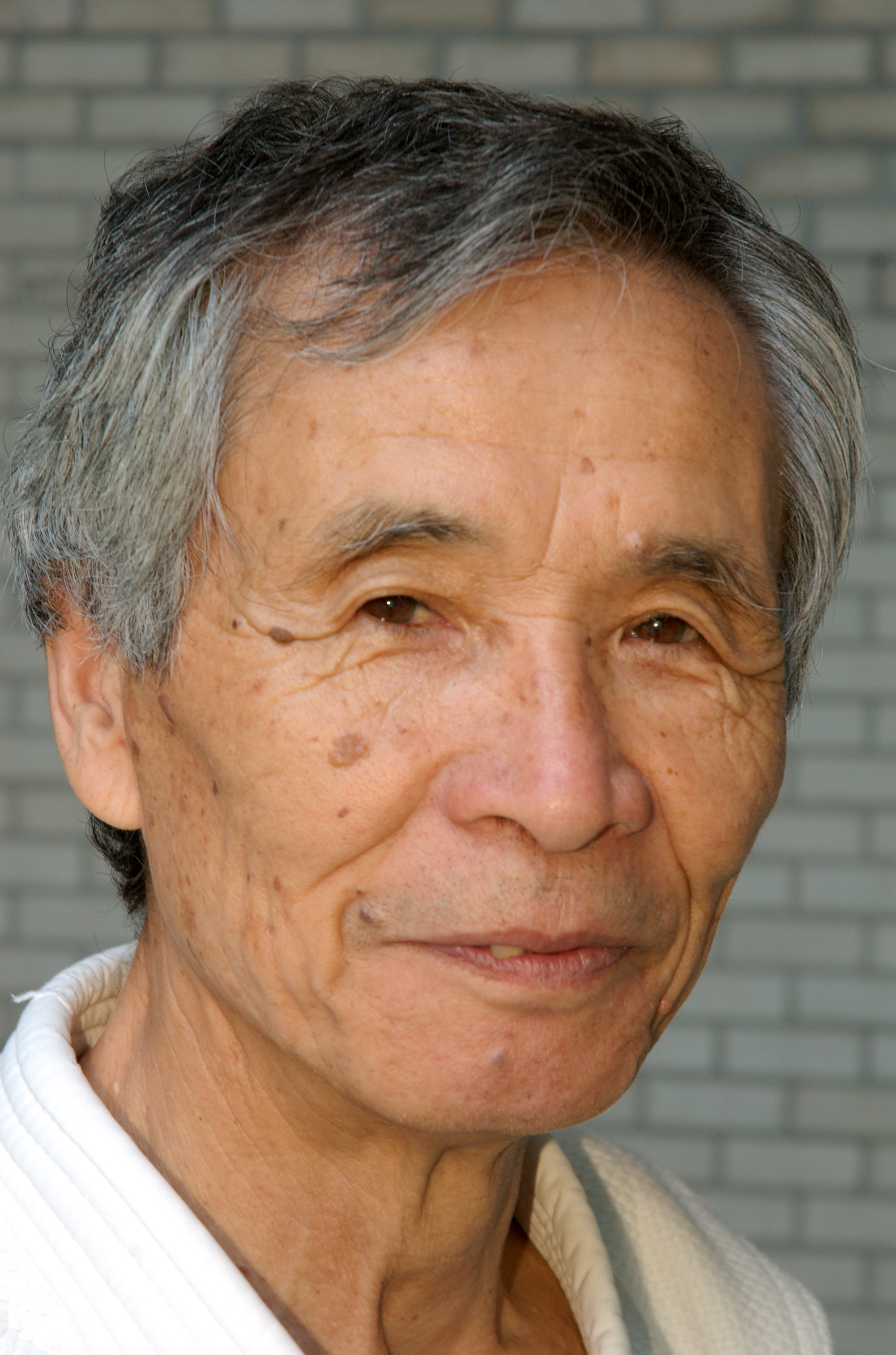
- Tamura in Lesneven in 2004
- Born: 2 March 1933; Osaka, Japan
- Died: 9 July 2010 (aged 77)
- Style: Aikido
- Rank: 8 dan

Other information
- Spouse: Rumiko Tamura
- Notable students: Pierre Chassang, Toshiro Suga, Nebi Vural, Mickaël Martin
- Notable clubs: Shumeikan Dojo, Fédération Française d'Aïkido et de Budo

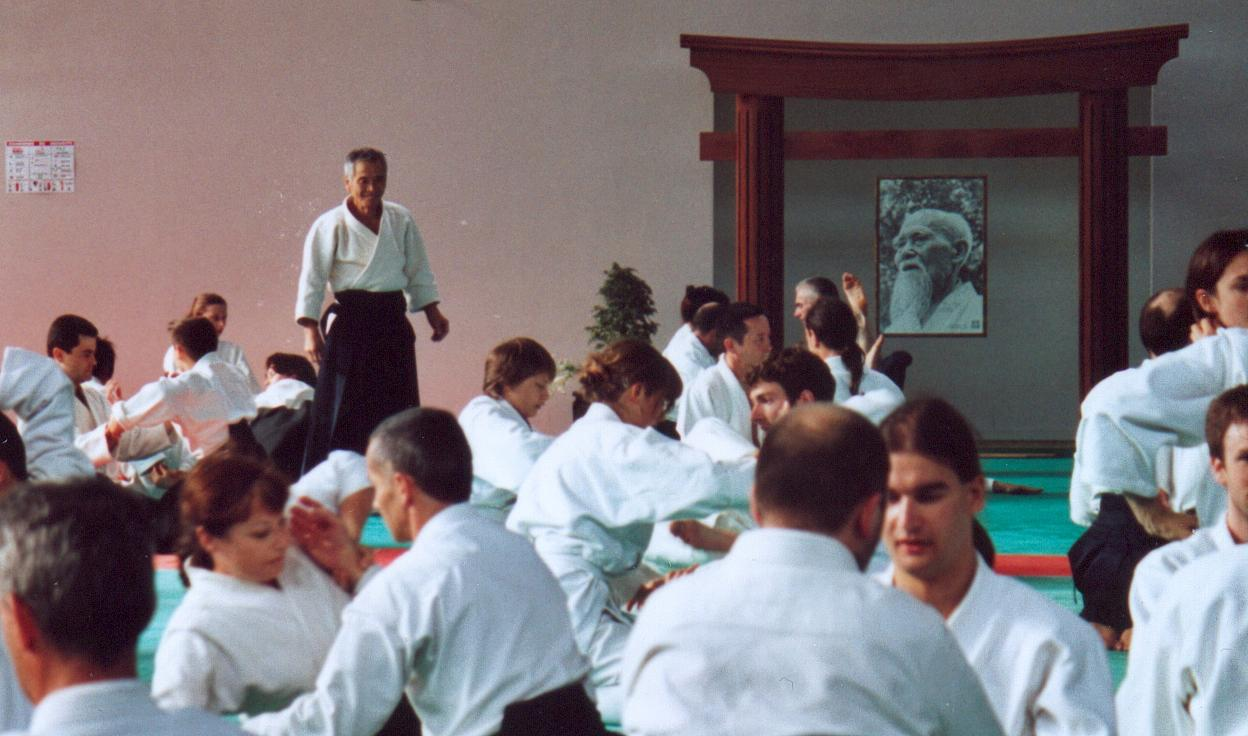
Nobuyoshi Tamura at the International aikido training in Lesneven, 2006

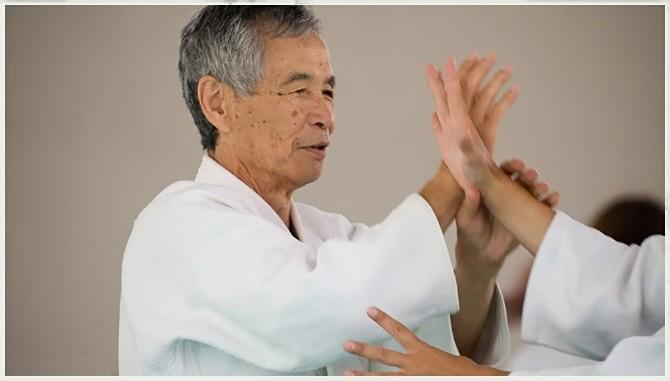
Nobuyoshi Tamura at the International aikido training in La Colle-sur-Loup, August 2005

Nobuyoshi Tamura (田村 信喜, Tamura Nobuyoshi; 2 March 1933 in Osaka – 9 July 2010) was a prominent aikidoka and a direct student of Morihei Ueshiba. The son of a kendo teacher, Tamura entered the Aikikai Hombu Dojo in 1953 as an uchi-deshi (live-in student) of aikido founder Morihei Ueshiba. He was one of Ueshiba's favorite pupils and since 1964 has greatly contributed to the development of aikido in Europe and France in particular. He was the National Technical Director (DTN) of the FFAB (French Federation of Aikido and Budō). He held the rank of 8th dan and the title of Shihan. Throughout his teaching career he trained many others instructors in various countries around the world but foremost Western Europe. In 1999, he received the medal of "Chevalier de l'ordre National du Mérite" from the French government. Tamura published several books on aikido in French. His dojo, Shumeikan Dojo, is located in the village of Bras, France. His former students include Jorge Rojo Gutierrez, Toshiro Suga, Pierre Chassang and Alain Peyrache.

== Career ==
Sent by Morihei Ueshiba, Tamura arrived in France in the port of Marseille in 1964 as the final destination of his honeymoon cruise (he paid part of his trip by performing aikido exhibitions on the ship). In France, he succeeded Tadashi Abe as the Aikikai representative there and decided to stay in this country teaching aikido, despite the fact that he could barely speak French at that time. Other aikido teachers in France then included Minoru Mochizuki, Masamichi Noro and Mutsuro Nakazono.

The French Aikido Federation was split into two in the 1980s purely because of political reasons. Those who decided to stay loyal to Tamura were for an independent aikido federation created the Fédération Française d'Aïkido et de Budo from scratch, while those who preferred to remain under the Judo federation (Fédération française de Judo et Disciplines Associées), later became independent as the Fédération française d'aïkido, aïkibudo et affinitaires under the technical leadership of Christian Tissier. The two once rival federations are now regrouped under the UFA (Union des Fédérations d'Aïkido).

In his early years in Japan, Tamura was acquainted with macrobiotic founder George Osawa. In France, he befriended zen master Taisen Deshimaru who arrived in this country in 1965 and whom Osawa considered as his successor.

Tamura was an honorary citizen of the town of Lesneven, France, where he gave week long yearly summer seminars with fellow aikido sensei Yoshimitsu Yamada. The other two important aikido trainings he gave every year during the summer were Saint-Mandrier and La Colle-sur-Loup.

He first visited Hungary in 1988, and held camps there on a yearly or bi-yearly basis until 2009.

== Personal life ==
Tamura married Rumiko, a student in Morihei Ueshiba's dojo. They had three sons, one of them, Yoshimichi, having a successful career in the movie industry as an animator. He was the lead animator for the character Helga in the Disney motion picture Atlantis: The Lost Empire.

== Death ==
Tamura died of cancer on the night of 9 July 2010.

== Published works ==
- National AIKIDO method (print), 1975 ACFA
- AIKIDŌ, Marseille 1986: AGEP; ISBN 2-9501355-0-1
- Aikido – Etikette und Weitergabe, (German Edition: ISBN 3-939703-50-8) Amazon-Germany ASIN: 3939703508
- Aikido – Etiquette et transmission. Manuel a l'usage des professeurs. Aix en Provence 1991: Editions du Soleil Levant, ISBN 2-84028-000-0
