= Aikidoka =

Master-level practitioner of aikido

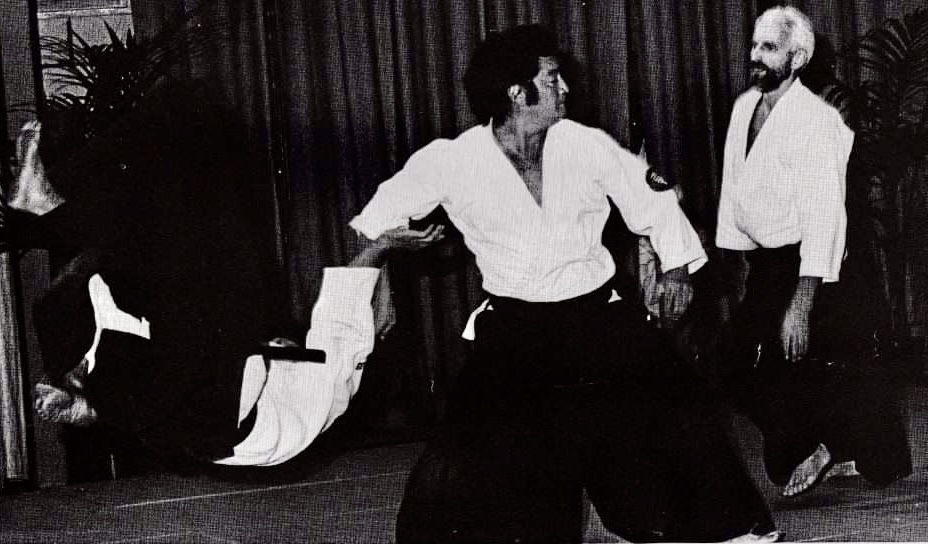
Yoshimitsu Yamada, master-level Aikido practitioner

Aikidoka (合気道家 aikidōka) is a Japanese term for a master-level practitioner of the martial art Aikido. The term is rarely heard among native speakers of Japanese, in spite of its common use as a loanword in other countries.

== Etymology ==
In the Japanese language, the suffix ka (家, -ka), when added to the name of certain activities, indicates either a person or a profession. In the martial arts, it is used to indicate one who has seriously dedicated their life to their chosen art, or made it a profession; thus karate-ka, judo-ka, aikido-ka and so on, and therefore is inappropriate to use in reference to the vast majority of practitioners.

== See also ==
- List of aikidoka
