= Shoji Nishio =

Japanese Aikido practitioner and innovator

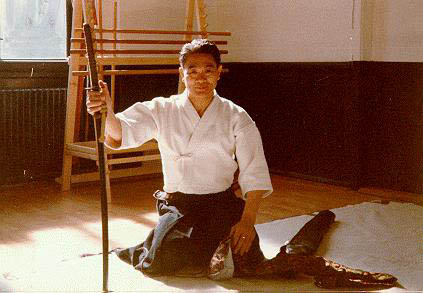
- Shoji Nishio in Århus, Denmark 1984
- Born: December 5, 1927; Aomori Prefecture, Japan
- Died: March 15, 2005 (aged 77); Tokyo, Japan
- Native name: 西尾 昭二
- Other names: Ai Do In Bu Yo Sho Gaku Yu Ko Ko Ji (posthumous Dharma name)
- Style: Aikido, Iaido
- Teachers: Morihei Ueshiba, Kyuzo Mifune, Yasuhiro Konishi, Shigenori Sano
- Rank: 8th Dan Aikikai, 7th Dan Iaido, 6th Dan Judo, 5th Dan Karate

Shoji Nishio (西尾 昭二, Nishio Shōji; December 5, 1927 – March 15, 2005) was a Japanese aikido practitioner and innovator. He held the rank of 8th dan shihan from the Aikikai. He also achieved high ranking honors in iaido, judo, karate.

Nishio developed his style based on his understanding of aikido founder Morihei Ueshiba's teaching and experience with other martial arts. The uniqueness of his style is the integration of the sword principles and atemi mechanics into aikido techniques. His contributions to martial art includes the creation of a new school of iaido, the introduction of aikido koshinage and different mechanical interpretations of classical budo concepts. Some emphases of his aikido style include the importance of acknowledgement of opposition, weapon techniques, atemi, and natural stance. Nishio contributed to the art's international spread through his teachings, publications, and the propagation of his style. By 2017, it was reported as being taught in 19 countries in Europe, America, Asia, South East Asia and Australia. He was honored by the Japanese Budo Federation with the Budo Kyoryusho award in 2003 for his contribution to aikido's development and global reach.

== Early martial arts training and influences ==
=== Judo ===
Nishio started practicing judo in 1942 in a dojo near the Ministry of Finance in the Japanese Mint, where he was then employed. After the war ended in 1945, he joined the Kodokan Judo Institute. Kyuzo Mifune, considered to be one of the greatest judo practitioners, was Nishio's trainer during this period. He was awarded 6th Dan Kodokan Judo. This background created the technical foundation that helps him introduced koshinage into official aikido throwing repertoire.

=== Karate ===
The restriction from judo competition made Nishio feel his martial art growth was inhibited, and he switched to practicing karate in 1950. Nishio trained under Yasuhiro Konishi, the founder of Shindō jinen-ryū (神道自然流) karate, and eventually reached 5th dan Shindō jinen-ryū. The technical influence of karate in Nishio's aikido style is significant, as he emphasized the importance of atemi (strikes) as well as the comprehensive range of atemi types in his teaching.

=== Encounter with aikido ===
Still feeling that karate was limiting, Nishio kept searching for another martial art. After being told about a ghost-like martial artist whom Nishio's sensei (trainer) at the time couldn’t hit, he decided to try aikido. With his karate friends, Nishio went to Nuke Benten to watch aikido. He signed up after watching two classes. Changing his primary martial art did not stop Nishio from practicing others. At the beginning of his aikido career, he still practiced judo and karate. It was common for him to train about five hours a day.

== Views and philosophy ==
Nishio joined Aikikai Hombu Dojo in 1952 after 10 years of practicing other martial arts. At the time, the dojo was not yet properly repaired after the war and there were around five people practicing on a good day. His fellow practitioners included Seigo Yamaguchi and Hiroshi Tada, among others. He was promoted to shihan (master instructor) and began to teach around 1955. As his aikido developed, he incorporated skills and principles of other martial arts into his own aikido style. In 1976, he was promoted to 8th dan aikido. His style is described by Aikido Journal as having "speed, effectiveness, and elegance".

=== Philosophy of engagement with oppositions ===
Nishio believed that one of aikido's core tenets was about acknowledging the other person. Most aikido techniques offer 3-4 opportunities to striking down opponents, but ultimately choose the least damaging option. This type of choice materializes the philosophy of acknowledgment, understanding, acceptance and mutual respect of and for others, even as they are opposition. Aikido's philosophy stands in contrast to other martial arts' goal of overcoming other. Nishio believed that this context helped recreating each technique close to the spirit of Ueshiba.

=== Views on Innovation ===
Nishio believed that the innovation of aikido was a requirement Ueshiba had from its practitioners. He also asked practitioners to develop based on their own background. His conclusion based on Ueshiba's words was

Before the Founder passed away thirty-four years ago he told us, “This old man has brought [aikido] this far; all of you must take it from here.” In light of these words, I think it is insufficient—unforgivable, in fact—for us to simply maintain the status quo.

The commitment to this view is reflected by Nishio's technical contributions and distinctions within the martial art world. Pranin described him as "one of the foremost technical innovators" in aikido.

=== Perspective on the relation between aikido and other martial arts ===
Nishio believed that other martial arts knowledge was a "nourishment" for one's aikido development.

All styles of budo are continuously struggling in their own fashion to improve. Practitioners of budo must remain aware of and understand the nature of these changes. Arts like karate, judo and kendo all have their good points and these can be used to nourish one's own budo training, taking them into account and making even greater efforts. [...] The only people who condemn other budo are those that do not practice them;. Shoji Nishio

Indeed, he was still practicing judo and karate for a period even after signing up for aikido. He also practiced in-depth iaido (and other weapons to a lesser extend) independently from his aikido training. His martial art technical application system is clearly influenced by knowledge and experience from other martial arts.

== Technical approach and contributions ==
Nishio's approach to aikido can be elementally described as aikido spirit and techniques perform in atemi rhythm following the sword's direction and purpose with judo tweak.

=== Shizentai ===
Nishio believed that shizentai - natural stance (自然体, shizen = natural, tai = body/posture) was the way to face an opponent, adversary, or training partner.

“Taking a stance” becomes a foundation upon which conflict can be built. - Shoji Nishio

==== Stance Form ====
In Nishio's style, the shizentai stance takes form of hand, hip straight down naturally. Both feet should also be straight with one slightly higher than the other. This feet position let the practitioner face his opposition directly and acknowledge him (a core tenet in Nishio-style). Practitioners of the Nishio style believe this stance is physical manifestation of humanity in aikido. Shizentai is the same when practitioner use a sword or a jo (a wooden stick). With the sword, the tip of the sword lie down near front foot in front of the holder. With the jo, the direction of the jo intersect with opposition's eyes.

==== Activity ====
Physically, these form a "no stance" stance; however, the practitioner should already taking a mental stance of acceptance, awareness, preparation. The hand is then offered to the opposition. Entering technique starts at the moment of contact. In comparison, most other aikido styles' stance is in kamae position (roughly means preparing stance before the fight). Practitioner's body is in triangle shape (feet spread out back and front, straight body) and having one hand or both hands extended forward, usually with extended fingers.

=== Tsukuri ===
Tsukuri (作り, "set-up") is the first of three stages in Nishio-style aikido technique execution, followed by kuzushi (breaking balance) and waza/kake (technique execution). The term combines tsuku (to create) with the noun-forming suffix ri. In budo context, tsukuri refers to creating advantageous positioning that can be converted into technique within one or two moves.

==== Application ====
Nishio teaching emphasizes taking initiative to elicit opponent reactions rather than passive response. Practitioners must adapt their setup to match personal body mechanics and intended technique. In weapons training, tsukuri involves either moving the weapon off the combat line or adopting shizentai (natural stance) without raising to defensive position.

==== Origins ====
The three-stage system likely derives from Nishio's judo background, though timing and application differ between the arts. This explicit three-stage framework is unique to Nishio's style, and is not found in mainstream aikido schools.

=== Irimi interpretation ===
In budo, irimi (入り身, iri = enter, mi = body) is essentially the movement to obtain an opponent's "dead angle." This refers to a strategic position offering effective strike and control opportunities while it is significantly harder/slower for the opposition to do so. In Nishio's style, in front-facing position, irimi is taken as a half-step instead of a one-step in other aikido schools. The step is to the right and slightly forward, create a direction of about 30 degree compare to the shoulder's initial position. Nishio style practitioners believe by taking half-step instead of full step, one stays connected to the opposition thereby maintaining effective control of the situation.

=== Atemi ===
Nishio performs tsuki ikkyo ura. He demonstrates the application 3 stages: tsukuri (using shizentai), kuzushi (using multiple atemis) and waza (using ikkyo) in a technique.

In budo, atemi means strike or blow to the body (当て身, ate = strike, mi = body). In aikido, atemis are often used to take off balance and focus rather than delivering decisive blow.

Aikido is forty percent throwing and sixty percent pinning. [...] Further, in all of the techniques there is atemi. [...] In the aikido I learned (and that I now teach), we do throws and pins with the rhythm and feeling of atemi. Shoij Nishio

In mainstream Aikido styles, atemi are demonstrated infrequently, and felt into disuse. In Nishio's style, atemis are everywhere and numerous (his teaching list at least 10 different hand strikes, 5 elbow strikes). Almost all aikido techniques demonstrated by Nishio have multiple atemis at the beginning and during techniques. More than strikes, atemis in his style determine the rhythm and timing of techniques.

=== Introduction of koshinage ===
Nishio performed koshinage at Edogawa demonstration in 1971

In Japansese, koshinage means hip throw (腰投げ, koshi = hip, nage = throw). The "hip throw" which is now commonly performed during promotion examinations at Aikikai dojos, was not a well-known technique at first. Aikido's throwing repertoire was limited to iriminage, shihonage, and kotegaeshi. Koshiwaza was independently researched and developed by Nishio (utilizing his judo background) and Yoshio Kuroiwa when they were young instructors at the headquarters, and it is said to have spread to other aikido practitioners.

== Approach toward weapons usage ==
In 1955, due to the lack of explanation regarding sword and jo techniques from Ueshiba (and other instructors), Nishio started to study iaido under Shigenori Sano (10th dan Muso Jikiden Eishin-ryu). He was awarded 7th Dan Nihon Zenkoku Iaido Renmei.

In iaido, Nishio practiced a number of different styles and consolidated what he believed to be useful. By 2001, numerous addition and revision of kata were introduced in Nishio's iaido system. At one point, the number of kata were over 30. By the end, he finalized his iaido system to 15 katas, most of which correlated to specific aikido movements. His new iaido system is called Aiki Toho Iai or Nishio-ryu Iai.

In 1957 or 1958, Nishio trained in jōdō with Takaji Shimizu (headmaster of Shintō Musō-ryū jōjutsu) and Yari or art of the spear (Hōzōin-ryū sōjutsu).

=== Underlying principles ===
Nishio performs ken tai ken version of ikkyo ura.

In Nishio's style, all techniques can be performed with the wooden sword bokken, wooden stick jo in hand as well as without weapons. A review of Nishio's instructional DVD set described his ken and jo applications as “fast and very subtle.”

I have experience in karate and judo, and feel the way of the sword is central, so I reflect empty-hand techniques and throws in my sword and jo movements. O-sensei said, "If your hands hold a sword, then aikido is a sword; if your hands hold a jo, then aikido is a jo." - Shoji Nishio

In weapon training, he believes, practitioners should try to be "on the edge". That means avoid being struck, deliver an effective final strike and stop within hair's breadth of contact.

=== Sword Techniques: The Concept of Misogi no Ken ===
The sword of Aikido [...] as an ideal tool for rectifying that which is wrong in the world, for cutting a path by which humanity can live, and for perfecting the self. - Shoji Nishio

Nishio's approach on sword work departed from Ueshiba's characterization of the "radiant sword of pacification". Nishio's sword utilization style can be described as the silent sword of purification.

==== Purpose ====
He believed the purpose of the aikido sword was to purify, as he called it the "sword of purification". Some of Nishio's views regarding the sword in aikido are as follows:

- The sword of aikido is not for cutting others. "Cutting is superseded by mutual coexistence". Rather, it is a tool to control the attack, even before its occurrence. The sword is used to redirect opponent's energy, voiding the need of physical strike. This approach emphasizes the focus on control, the removal of conflict and unnecessary of damaging others. Thereby using in this way, it will forge the sword's controller out of mental "impurities" (the desire to hurt and creation of conflict).
- The sword techniques in aikido aim to find unified direction. Therefore it is a tool to guide both persons toward new understanding and mutual respect. This aspect shows the "purification" of intention of the opposition.
- The swords also help practitioners understand the core physical mechanics of empty-handed aikido techniques. This view of utility emphasizes striving for perfection of bodily movements, hence "purifying".

==== Characteristic ====
The sword of aikido makes no sound. - Shoji Nishio

Described as otonashi, or "silent," which means sword techniques produces almost no harsh sound. It is the result of Nishio's sword work relies on minimal blade contact with opposition's sword. His sword techniques anticipate and exploit gaps in opponent's attacks, turning defense into offense usually in one single precisely timed movements. This approach differs from the teaching of Morihito Saito (who is well-known for close adherence to Ueshiba's approach), where the significant part of controls are achieved through impact with the other sword, resulting in clashing of the swords heard throughout.

== Criticism ==
Nishio's approach to the development and application of aikido techniques was not always accepted by other senior practitioners. Koichi Tohei was notably critical of Nishio's methods and reportedly stated that they were not aikido.

== Impact and influence ==
Nishio's influence extended beyond Japan and martial art techniques. He contributed to the international development of aikido throughout the world by teaching, holding seminars and help establishing dojos of his aikido style. The regions teaching Nishio-style aikido include Europe, the United States, Mexico, Vietnam, Iran, Australia. In 2003, Nishio received the Budo Kyoryusho award from Japanese Budo Federation for his lifetime contribution to development and worldwide propagation of aikido.

=== Senior practitioners ===
Nishio cultivated a following in many countries. Some senior practitioners of his style includes:

Name	Aikido Ranking	Other dan ranking	Practice country
Takao Arisue	8th dan	7th dan Aikido Toho Iai	Japan, Denmark
Koji Yoshida	7th dan	6th dan renshi Musoshinden ryu iaido, 7th dan Aikido Toho Iai	Japan, USA, France, Czech Republic
Jean-Michel Bovio	7th dan	7th dan Aikido Toho Iai	France, Germany, Czech Republic
Ichiro Shishiya	7th dan	5th dan Aikido Toho Iai	Japan, Sweden
Kunio Yoshimoto	7th dan	5th dan iaido	
Paul Muller	7th dan	5th dan Aikido Toho Iai	France
Philip Greenwood	6th dan	5th dan iaido	USA

== Personal life ==
Nishio was born in Aomori Prefecture of Japan in 1927. Occupationally, he mostly worked for the Ministry of Finance in the Japanese Mint for his entire career from 1942 to 1980. He is known for being mild-mannered and frequently smiling. He died in March 2005 from prostate cancer.

== Published works ==
=== Books ===
- Shoji Nishio, Aikido – Yurusu Budo. The Irimi-Issoku Principle, Dou Publishing, 2004. ISBN 4-900586-29-3.
- “The Path to Forgiving Martial Arts” (Interview) “Definitive Edition Morihei Ueshiba and Aikido 2 - Direct Disciples Talking About the Founder” edited by Aiki News Editorial Department, Dou Publishing, 2006, ISBN 4-900586-83-8 .

=== DVDs ===
- "Shoji Nishio's Aikido Volume 1: Reverse half body one-handed/Aihan body one-handed edition", Dou Publishing, 2004, ISBN 4-900586-41-2 .
- "Shoji Nishio's Aikido Volume 2: Sho-uchi Edition", Dou Publishing, 2004, ISBN 4-900586-42-0 .
- "Shoji Nishio's Aikido Volume 3: Yokomen-uchi/Ryote-dori/Sode-dori/Shoulder-men-uchi edition", Dou Publishing, 2004, ISBN 4-900586-43-9 .
- "Shoji Nishio's Aikido Volume 4: Aikido Toho Iai Edition", Dou Publishing, 2004, ISBN 4-900586-44-7 .
