= Mutsuro Nakazono =

Masahilo Mutsuro Nakazono

Mutsuro Nakazono (May 22, 1918 – October 8, 1994) (first name also spelled "Mitsuro"; also known as Masahilo Mikoto Nakazono; and later, Mikoto Masahilo Nakazono)) was a Japanese acupuncturist, an Oriental medicine practitioner, a judo 6th dan and a 7th dan Aikikai aikido master. He studied under Morihei Ueshiba (the founder of Aikido) and Ogasawara (a teacher of the Kototama Principle) for many years. Born in the Kagoshima prefecture of Japan, he relocated to France in 1961 where he remained until the early 1970s as a representative of the Aikikai in Europe and North Africa. According to an article by his son, Jei Atacama, Mutsuro Nakazono "changed his name to Masahilo Mikoto Nakazono in his late fifties when he came to realize how his whole life was about his pursuit for 'the truth of life.' 'Masahilo' stood for 'searcher for the beautiful truth of life.'" During this period he was also Chief instructor of Aikido for the international Budo Council. According to Henry Ellis, a pioneer of UK Aikido, Nakazono Sensei's Aikido technique was "the first seen in the U.K. to combine the power found with other instructors, with the grace normally associated with Aikido today." He operated the Nakazono Clinic, a natural healing center in San Diego, California. He moved to Santa Fe, New Mexico in 1972 and lived there until his death in 1994.

Nakazono was an authority on kototama and wrote privately published books on the subject. His study of kototama was greatly influenced by his studies with Ueshiba who cultivated a spiritual outlook in his teachings. Ueshiba is believed to have mastered kototama to a certain degree, yet few of his disciples other than Nakazono demonstrated an interest in learning this aspect of aikido from him.

Nakazono was also deeply involved in the spiritual aspect of healing such as Inochi. Having descended from a long family tradition of healers he passed on both his interest in Aikido and his spiritual approach to healing to his son Jiro Nakazono (now known as Jei Atacama) who practiced spiritual healing in New York City until his own death.

In 2007 there was a series of memorial events in Rossfall, Switzerland and Neath, UK sponsored by Nakazono Sensei's students in memory of their beloved teacher.

== Works ==
- M. Masahilo Nakazono, Inochi - The Book of Life (1979/1984) Kototama Books ISBN 0-9716674-1-1
- M. Masahilo Nakazono, My Past Way Of Budo (1979) Kototama Books ISBN 0-9716674-0-3
- M. Masahilo Nakazono, The Real Sense Of Natural Therapy (1985) Kototama Books ISBN 0-9716674-0-3
- M. Masahilo Nakazono, The Source of the Present Civilization (1990) Kototama Books ISBN 0-9716674-3-8
- M. Masahilo Nakazono, The Source of the Old and NewTestaments (1990) Kototama Books ISBN 978-0-9716674-4-0
