= Terry Dobson (aikidoka) =

American aikido teacher and writer (1937–1992)

- Born: Walter Norton Dobson III; June 9, 1937; Cambridge, Massachusetts, U.S.
- Died: August 2, 1992 (aged 55); Inverness, California, U.S.
- Occupations: Aikido teacher and writer

Terry Dobson (born Walter Norton Dobson III; June 9, 1937 – August 2, 1992) was an American aikido teacher and writer. He trained at the Aikikai Hombu Dojo in Tokyo in the early 1960s and later taught aikido in the United States.

== Early life ==
Born in Cambridge, Massachusetts to a wealthy family on June 9, 1937 and moving to New York City in 1940, Dobson had a tumultuous childhood. Raised by his alcoholic mother and stepfather, he did not meet his real father, who had been disgraced after it was discovered that he forged his degree to get into Harvard Business School, until his late teens.

Terry went to the Buckley School and then Deerfield Academy, both prestigious private schools, where he excelled at American football. After receiving a scholarship to play at Franklin & Marshall, he quickly failed out and trained for a summer with the New York Football Giants under Vince Lombardi, the line coach at the time. He was a U.S. Marine doing helicopter maintenance during the Lebanon crisis of 1958, and attended New York University for a brief period. In 1959 he went to Japan to assist in rural development and teach English.

== Discovering aikido ==
During a visit to Tokyo, Dobson witnessed a demonstration of what was then the little-known martial art aikido on an American military base in Yokohama. He instantly fell in love with the art and six months later entered the Aikikai Hombu Dojo as an uchi-deshi (live-in student), and trained there for several years in the early 1960s. He continued to train at the Hombu Dojo until Morihei Ueshiba's death in 1969.

Fellow American student Robert Frager later recalled Dobson's presence at Aikikai Hombu Dojo in the early 1960s: "Terry Dobson was living in Tokyo, but I didn't meet him for months. He was running around trying to import posters or something." Robert Nadeau also identified Dobson as part of the early Hombu Dojo community in the period.

While training at Aikikai Hombu Dojo in Tokyo, Dobson served as Business Manager of Aikido, the Aikikai's first English-language newspaper, from its inaugural issue in January 1964. The quarterly publication—a companion to the Japanese-language Aikido Shinbun—was launched to accompany the global spread of aikido, with Ueshiba Kisshomaru as publisher, Tamura Nobuyoshi as editorial supervisor, and Sidney White as editor. Dobson contributed under his given name, Walter N. Dobson.

Dobson was among the foreign students who served as uke for Ueshiba. He appears taking ukemi for Ueshiba in Aikido Journal's identification of a 1962 film record.

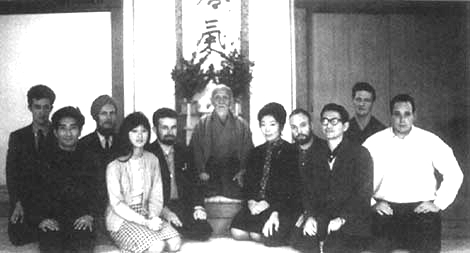
Terry Dobson with Morihei Ueshiba and foreign students at a birthday party

== Spreading aikido in the U.S. ==
Dobson returned to the United States in the early 1970s, initially living in the San Francisco area, where he gave frequent seminars. With Ken Nisson he co-founded Bond Street Dojo in New York City and Vermont Aikido in Burlington, Vermont. He later settled in Vermont. In 1979 he moved to San Francisco, California and became involved with Robert Bly and his Mythopoetic men's movement, still teaching aikido as a visiting sensei.

== Death ==
In 1984 he became ill with what was misdiagnosed as sarcoidosis and moved to Vermont to recover. His teaching trailed off and eventually stopped as he became weaker and weaker. After a change in medication his health improved and he started teaching again in Vermont. Though not fully healthy, he flew to California to give a men's conference and teach aikido in 1992. After teaching a class in San Francisco, he fell into a coma. On August 2, 1992, he died in an ambulance in Inverness, California of a heart attack. Dobson is survived by his daughter Marion, son Daniel, and partner Riki Moss.

== Publications ==
- Miller, Victor B.; Dobson, Terry (1978). Giving in to Get Your Way: The Attack-Tics System for Winning Your Everyday Battles. New York: Delacorte Press. ISBN 0-440-03247-4.
- Terry Dobson with Judith Shepherd-Chow (1981). Safe and Alive: How to Protect Yourself, Your Family, and Your Property Against Violence. Los Angeles: J. P. Tarcher, Inc. ISBN 0-87477-189-7.
- Miller, Victor B.; Dobson, Terry (1993). Aikido in Everyday Life: Giving in to Get Your Way. Richmond, California: North Atlantic Books. ISBN 1-55643-151-1.
- Watson, Jan E.; Dobson, Terry; Moss, Riki (1994). It's a Lot Like Dancing: An Aikido Journal. Frog Ltd. ISBN 1-883319-02-1.
- Riki Moss with Terry Dobson (2009). An Obese White Gentleman In No Apparent Distress. Blue Snake Books. ISBN 978-1-58394-270-3.
