= Yasuo Kobayashi =

Japanese aikidoka

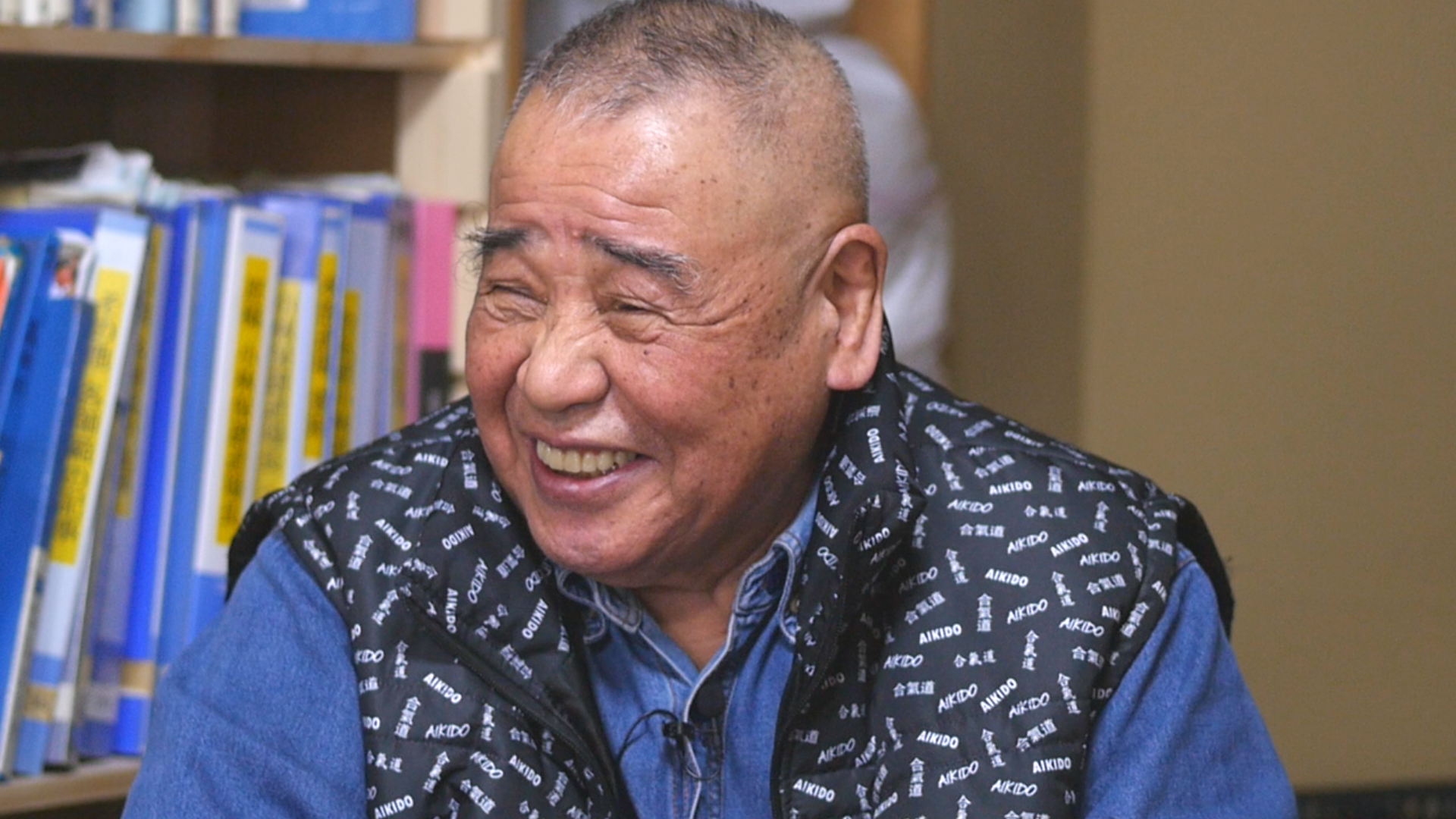

Yasuo Kobayashi (小林 保雄, Kobayashi Yasuo; born September 20, 1936) is a Japanese aikido teacher holding the rank of 8th dan Aikikai.

Kobayashi was born in Kudan, Chiyoda-ku, in Tokyo. Though he started practicing judo as a child at the Kodokan, he eventually switched to aikido soon after starting university and he entered the Aikikai Hombu dojo as an uchideshi under Morihei Ueshiba in 1954. In 1969, he established his own dojo in Kodaira. He is also responsible for the aikido clubs at the Meiji University, Saitama University, and the Tokyo Economics University. He is regularly invited to teach abroad, in Taiwan, Finland, Sweden, United Kingdom, Canada (Calgary), the Nishida Dojo and Shikanai Dojos in Brazil, Germany, South Korea and the United States.

As of January, 2003, there are 120 groups that are directly controlled or more loosely affiliated to Kobayashi's organisation Aikido Kobayashi Dojo. For its efforts to spread aikido among people, the Kobayashi Dojo received an organizational award for excellence from the Japan Budo Council in 1987.

He maintains residence at his dojo in Kodaira, Tokyo.
