= Akira Tohei =

Japanese aikido teacher (1929–1999)

Akira Tōhei
- Born: August 20, 1929; Tochigi Prefecture, Japan
- Died: July 2, 1999 (aged 69); Chicago, Illinois, USA
- Native name: 藤平明 Tōhei Akira
- Style: Aikido
- Teacher: Morihei Ueshiba
- Rank: 8th dan, shihan

Akira Tohei (August 20, 1929 – July 2, 1999) was a Japanese aikido teacher. He held the rank of 8th dan in the Aikikai.

He began his aikido practice in 1946 under Koichi Tohei, then the chief instructor at Aikikai Honbu Dojo. From 1956 he practiced under the direct instruction of aikido founder Morihei Ueshiba. In 1963, Tohei was asked by Morihei Ueshiba to accompany his son, Kisshomaru Ueshiba, on a tour of aikido dojo throughout the United States. When the three-month journey ended in Hawaii, Tohei remained for a further nine months and taught aikido throughout the Hawaiian Islands. On his return to Japan he joined the teaching staff at Aikikai Hombu Dojo.

For the next eight years Tohei, in addition to his teaching at the headquarters, was also an instructor at Asia University, Akita Economics University (now North Asia University), Keio University, Nihon Women's University, the Japan Ground Self-Defense Force, and the Japan Maritime Self-Defense Force.

In 1966, Aikikai Honbu Dojo awarded Tohei the title of Shihan. In 1972, he was dispatched to America as chief instructor of the Illinois Aikido Club in Chicago, Illinois, where he organized the Midwest Aikido Federation. In 1975 he founded the Midwest Aikido Center, also located in Chicago. With the founding of the United States Aikido Federation in 1976, he became the chief instructor of its Midwest Region. Tohei was promoted to 8th dan in 1989 by Kisshomaru Ueshiba.

As its Chief Instructor, Akira Tohei taught aikido classes daily at the Midwest Aikido Center until shortly before his death in July, 1999, just before his 70th birthday.
