= Aiki =

Aiki may refer to:

- Aiki (Dancer), South Korean dancer
- Aiki (martial arts principle), in Japanese martial arts
- Aiki language, spoken in Chad
- Aiki (film), a 2002 Japanese film
- Aiki Framework, a PHP + MYSQL (LAMP) web application framework
- Ariki, a noble rank
- Aiki, a 2004–2013 manga by Isutoshi

It sometimes used as a short form for aiki arts such as:

- Aikido
- Aiki-jō
- Aiki-ken
- Aikijujutsu

== People with the surname ==
- Ellinor Aiki (1893–1969), Estonian painter
- Takashi Aiki (相木 崇, born 1978), Japanese baseball player

== People with the given name ==
- Aiki Miyahara (宮原 愛輝, born 2002), Japanese footballer
- Aiki Segi (堰 愛季, born 1991), Japanese footballer
