= Iwama style =

Style in the Japanese martial art of aikido

Iwama-style Aikido (岩間合気道) is the style of aikido that was taught in Iwama by the founder of aikido, Morihei Ueshiba, and especially the lineage passed on through Morihiro Saito, a close disciple who was given responsibility over Iwama dojo by Ueshiba.

It is also known by other names including Iwama-ryū (see: ryū) and Iwama Aikido. It is often associated with the term Takemusu after the martial concept. It is sometimes also referred to as Traditional or Dentō (伝統, lit. traditional).

It is sometimes called Saito style, though never by Iwama stylists themselves as Saito insisted that he intended to preserve the founder's style.

== Ranks ==
At one point Saito gave out specific Iwama-ryu ranks at the insistence of his European students. However, he always awarded ranks through the Aikikai (original Aikido organization) out of respect for the Ueshiba family.

Saito also gave out mokuroku (scrolls) for his aiki-ken (sword) and aiki-jo (staff) with levels loosely modeled after the traditional license system of classical Japanese martial arts to students independent of Iwama-ryu ranks.

Today, Iwama-style aikido organisations can be found both within and outside of the Aikikai. The main non-Aikikai branch is Iwama Shin-Shin Aiki Shuren-kai, founded by Morihiro Saito's son Hitohiro Saito. It continues to issue Iwama-ryu grading certificates; however, many of Saito's longest students have remained affiliated with the Aikikai. In Europe some of these groups belong to the Takemusu Aikido Kyokai umbrella organisation. In the United States, the major organization is the Takemusu Aikido Association.

== Style ==
Iwama style includes the combined study (riai) of traditional Japanese weapons (bukiwaza), specifically aiki-jō (staff) and aiki-ken (sword), and of empty-handed aikido (taijutsu), both accompanied by kiai. Iwama practitioners often claim that their aikido is close to that of the founder, as preserved by Morihiro Saito, largely based on photos taken from the Noma Dojo and a technical manual written by the founder.

Among non-Iwama Aikikai practitioners, a common opinion is that Iwama style mainly is Morihei Ueshiba's aikido of the 1940s and 1950s not taking into consideration his later years, though Ueshiba resided in Iwama until his death there.

== Pedagogy ==
Iwama-style aikido tends to be highly codified compared to most aikido practice. Weapons training, including kata, is stressed. Techniques are generally practiced first from a static grab and footwork is broken up into numbered steps. In addition weapons work involves many repetitions of suburi and paired weapons practice is practiced with a pause between each movement until students are relatively advanced.

A great deal of emphasis is placed on a stable hanmi or stance in Iwama-style aikido.

Every class in an Iwama-style dojo begins with the techniques tai-no-henko and morotedori kokyu-ho and ends with kokyu-dosa.

Several Iwama-style dojos around the world, such as Aikido in Fredericksburg, offer live-in apprentice programs ("uchi-deshi programs") modeled after Saito's program in Iwama.

=== Progression ===
Saito believed in a progression from static techniques to the spontaneous takemusu aiki. Many Iwama-style practitioners practice in stages, most often divided into:

1. Kihon (basic/foundational) or kotai (static) practice
2. Yawarakai or jutai (soft, flowing movement)
3. Ki-no-nagare (lit. the flow of ki)

== Technical characteristics ==
In certain stances, a slight tilt of the hips is characteristic of the style. The feet are kept on a line, but the front foot points forward rather than turned out (in contrast to the Yoshinkan) causing the hips to be slightly rotated.

In jo work, the posture of hito-emi, or standing with a dramatically minimized profile facing the opponent, is another unique characteristic of Iwama aikido.

Many techniques, especially techniques that begin from shomen-uchi, start with nage (thrower or initiator) initiating a strike to uke (receiver) in the basic form of the technique. This is common in Yoshinkan, Manseikan, and Michio Hikitsuchi's basic practices and the founder's instruction in budo, but opposite of how many other styles of Aikido teach the techniques. Even when uke is striking, it is emphasized that tori initiates the encounter. Saito referred to this as the "way of the mountain echo" (yamabiko no michi), presumably after a poem by the founder.

In keeping with the above, most grabs in Iwama aikido are formalized as a response to a threat from nage unlike in most aikido styles that start attacks with a grab. As a result, Iwama-style grabs are firm and static without pushing or pulling and with the intention of immobilizing the body.

Suwari-waza in Iwama style is started completely in seiza. This is in contrast to some other styles where the practitioners often start already on their toes (kiza).

Iwama stylists employ kiai and atemi with great consistency.

Koshi-nage in Iwama-style aikido is always performed with the hips perpendicular to the uke and the hips acting as a fulcrum.

In ukemi (responding) Iwama practitioners will usually attempt to parry the atemi being thrown by nage, which may or may not be encouraged in other styles of aikido. Rolls are usually performed with the rear leg tucked.

=== Buki-waza (weapons technique) ===
Focus on bukiwaza and riai (the relationship between weapons and taijutsu) is a hallmark of this style. Some of the bukiwaza practices were developed by Morihei Ueshiba while others are Saito's distillations of his teachings and practices.

Weapons practice includes suburi, awase (1-step paired exercises), solo and paired kata, and tanren-uchi (striking a log or tire) with the jo and wooden sword. Though not formally part of the curriculum, Saito practiced Negishi-ryu and shuriken (throwing stars) is also sometimes practiced.

The sword forms of Iwama style are generally recognized as being descended from Kashima Shinto-ryu sword techniques. In particular the first two kumitachi are nearly identical in the sequence of cuts to forms from Kashima Shinto-ryu. It is also believed that Yagyu style had influence through Masakatsu Nakai's instruction of Ueshiba.

It has been widely observed that the ken-tai-jo are remarkably similar to spear techniques of Kukishin-ryu. Ueshiba was close friends with the Kuki family; this, along with the spear-like handling of the jo in Iwama style, has led to speculation that the Kukishin-ryu spear is partially the basis of Aiki-jo, though there is not enough evidence that Ueshiba formally studied the art in any depth.

== Ara-Waza and Henka-Waza ==
Ara-waza, literally coarse techniques, are occasionally practiced by Iwama-style aikido practitioners. These techniques are intended to explicitly show the injurious applications latent in aikido techniques and include simple kicks targeting the knees and entangling or twisting joints during throws with the option to break them. Some henka-waza (modified basic techniques) in Iwama-style aikido also include entangling joints, locking large joints, strikes to vital points, and occasionally chokes using the arm or the partner's uniform (dogi). For safety reasons these are never performed fully.
