= Patricia Hendricks =

American aikidoka

Patricia Hendricks is an American aikido teacher and founder of Aikido of San Leandro. She is also the head of division one (the Iwama division) of the California Aikido Association and is the first "menkyo-kaiden" in Saito's system of aiki-ken and aiki-jo. As a 7th Dan Shihan, she is one of the highest and most noted aikido instructors in the world. She teaches internationally and runs a full-time dojo in San Leandro. She spent more than 7 years as uchi-deshi, living in dojos, primarily in Iwama, Japan under Morihiro Saito, a top student of the founder of aikido, Morihei Ueshiba. She was one of Saito's closest students, with numerous appearances in his books, as well as appearing with him in magazine articles and as his uke for major demonstrations including the All Japan Demo held in Tokyo, Japan every year.

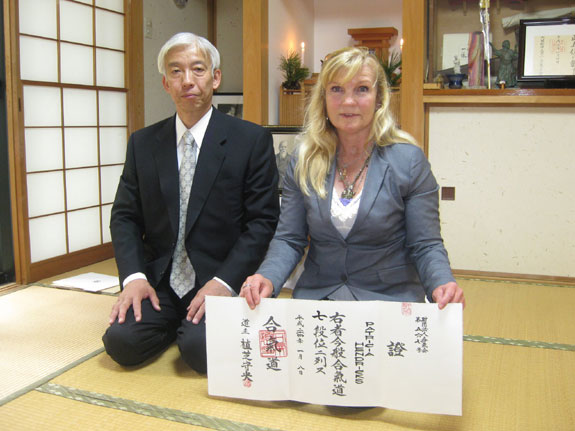
Hendricks Sensei receiving 7th dan from Moriteru Ueshiba Doshu in 2012.

She started studying aikido in June 1974 while a student at Monterey Peninsula College in Monterey, California. She had been interested in studying a martial art and found a course in aikido being offered that semester. The instructor was Mary Heiny, who was a Sandan at that time, and who had recently returned from studying in Japan. It was during that semester of study that she heard about Stanley Pranin, who was teaching aikido to a small group of students in his garage in Monterey. She studied with Stan Pranin until 1977, at which time she and Stan Pranin both moved to Oakland to train with Bruce Klickstein and then with Bill Witt. Later that same year she moved to Iwama, Japan, where she became uchi-deshi and a student of Saito. She returned to Oakland in 1979 and continued studying at the same dojo.

Over the next 28 years, she returned regularly to Iwama for brief and long term periods of study with Saito. During this time, she also earned her degree in Oriental Languages (with emphasis in Japanese) from U.C. Berkeley. In 1984, she founded the Aikido of San Leandro dojo. In 1988, she embarked on a 6-month European tour, combining travel and teaching, before once again returning to Iwama for study as a long-term uchi-deshi for another 18 months.

At present, she is the head of the Division 1 of the California Aikido Association, and is authorized by Saito to conduct weapons testing. She was the first to be awarded Menkyo Kaidan by Saito Morihiro.

She is one of the pioneering aikidoka for women.
