= Iwama =

Iwama may refer to:

- Iwama, Ibaraki, a former town in Nishiibaraki District, Ibaraki Prefecture, Japan
- Iwama dojo, an aikido dojo
- Iwama Station, a train station in Kasama, Ibaraki Prefecture, Japan
- Iwama style, a style of aikido

== People with the surname ==
- Kazuo Iwama (disambiguation), multiple people
- Yoshiomi Iwama (岩間 良臣, born 1952), Japanese pole vaulter
- Yudai Iwama (岩間 雄大, born 1986), Japanese footballer
