= Saito sensei =

Saito sensei may refer to:

- Morihiro Saito, aikido teacher
- Hitohiro Saito, aikido teacher, son of Morihiro Saito
