= Isoyama =

Isoyama (written: 磯山) is a Japanese surname. Notable people with the surname include:

- Hiroshi Isoyama (磯山 博, born 1937), Japanese aikidoka
- Kazushi Isoyama (磯山 和司, born 1975), Japanese footballer
- Sayaka Isoyama (磯山 さやか, born 1983), Japanese gravure idol, television personality, actress and writer

== See also ==
- Isoyama Station, a railway station in Suzuka, Mie Prefecture, Japan
