= Women's Hard Styles at WAKO World Championships 2007 Coimbra =

The women's 'Hard Styles' category involved fifteen contestants from ten countries across three continents – Europe, Africa and North America. Each contestant went through seven performances (2 minutes each) with the totals added up at the end of the event. The gold medal went to Great Britain's Jessica Holmes, the silver and bronze to Russians Olga Kudinova and Elena Chirkova respectively. Chirkova would also win a silver medal in the women's 'Hard Styles with Weapons' category.

== Results ==
Position	Contestant	1	2	3	4	5	6	7	Total
1	Jessica Holmes (United Kingdom)	9,6	9,4	9,6	9,5	9,5	9,6	9,5	47,7
2	Olga Kudinova (Russia)	9,7	9,5	9,6	9,3	9,4	9,7	9,4	47,6
3	Elena Chirkova (Russia)	9,6	9,3	9,4	9,2	9,3	9,4	9,6	47,0
4	Sarah-Kim Gagnon (Canada)	9,5	9,4	9,2	9,3	9,3	9,5	9,3	46,8
5	Ashley Lima (United States)	9,3	9,5	9,3	9,3	9,2	9,5	9,2	46,6
6	Terri Jacoby (United States)	9,2	9,2	9,5	9,4	9,3	9,3	9,2	46,4
7	Maria Pekarchik (Belarus)	9,5	9,2	9,4	9,1	9,4	9,2	9,1	46,3
8	Marie-Hélène Leboeuf (Canada)	9,2	9,1	9,3	9,2	9,2	9,4	9,1	46,0
9	Judith Weck (Germany)	8,9	9,2	9,4	9,0	9,1	9,2	9,2	45,7
10	Tina Koder (Slovenia)	9,2	9,1	9,0	8,9	9,1	9,1	8,9	45,2
11	Anja Teilman (Norway)	9,3	9,0	9,1	8,9	8,9	9,0	9,0	45,0
12	Anette Sexe (Norway)	9,0	8,8	8,7	8,8	9,0	9,1	9,1	44,7
13	Valeria Ziviani (Canada)	8,5	8,6	9,0	9,0	8,9	8,9	9,6	44,4
14	Megan Brink (South Africa)	8,7	8,8	9,0	8,8	8,8	8,8	9,0	44,2
15	Anastasiya Ovod (Ukraine)	9,2	8,8	8,9	8,8	8,7	8,8	8,8	44,1

== See also ==
- List of WAKO Amateur World Championships
- List of WAKO Amateur European Championships
- List of female kickboxers
