= Wae Gong =

Martial arts term

Wae Gong (왜공), which translates from Korean as External Power, is the development of physical combat skills which takes the form of offensive and defensive techniques, kicking combinations in both hard/linear and soft/circular movements, the achievement of complete physical control.

== See also ==
- Korean martial arts
- Hard and soft (martial arts)
