= Iwaya =

Iwaya is a surname. Notable people with the surname include:

- Mihoko Iwaya (岩屋 美保子, born 1964), Japanese footballer
- Naomine Iwaya (岩谷 高峰, born 1960), Japanese alpine skier
- Shogo Iwaya (岩谷 翔吾, born 1997), Japanese dancer and actor
- Takeshi Iwaya (岩屋 毅, born 1957), Japanese politician
- Toru Iwaya (岩谷 徹, born 1936), Japanese mezzotint engraver and painter

== See also ==
- Iwama (disambiguation)
