= Segi =

Segi or SEGI may refer to:

- Aiki Segi (born 1991), a Japanese professional footballer
- Hwarang Segi, a Korean historical book
- Naoki Segi, Japanese director
- Patrick Segi (born 1980), a New Zealand-born Samoan former rugby union player
- Segi (organization), a Basque organization
- SEGi University College, a university college in Malaysia
- SEGI (France), French owners of rolling stock

Other spelling

- Seghe, Solomon Islands (other spelling)
- Szegi, village in Hungary
