= Michio Hikitsuchi =

Japanese aikidoka (1923–2004)

- Michio Hikitsuchi
- Born: July 14, 1923; Near Shingu, Wakayama Prefecture, Japan
- Died: February 2, 2004 (aged 80); Japan
- Native name: 引土道雄 Hikitsuchi Michio
- Nationality: Japanese
- Style: Aikido

Michio Hikitsuchi (引土道雄, Hikitsuchi Michio; July 14, 1923 – February 2, 2004) was an aikido instructor and was the chief instructor of the Kumano Juku Dojo, in Shingu, Wakayama Prefecture, Japan, for fifty years.

== Career ==
At the age of nine, Hikitsuchi began kendo, and then later kenjutsu, jujutsu, bojutsu and karate. Hikitsuchi trained extensively in Jūkendō (bayonet) as a young man, and was skilled in both iaido and kendo.

When he was 14, he met Morihei Ueshiba. At that time there was an age requirement for studying budo with Ueshiba, so his formal study had to wait; in one of his interviews with Stanley Pranin published in Aikido Pioneers (Aiki News 2010), Kisshomaru Ueshiba, Morihei's son, mentions that "It was sometime about 1925 or 26 that my father went to Shingu. Mr. Hikitsuchi was not there at that time. He began studying under my father around 1953 or 54."

Hikitsuchi recounts a midnight, lights-out training with Ueshiba, in which he cut off the tip of Ueshiba's bokken. The piece flew off, and he searched throughout the dojo for it. Eventually, Ueshiba pulled it out of the folds of his kimono, praising him highly for his skill. Months later, Ueshiba gave Hikitsuchi a scroll inscribed with "Bojutsu Masakatsu Agatsu" (True Victory is Self-Victory). The scroll was extensively illustrated by a famous artist, and contained Ueshiba's written explanations of techniques. Meik Skoss, who has seen the scroll, wrote, "One of the phrases on the scroll is very interesting, 'each of these pictures is the seed for a hundred techniques; study them well.'"

According to Clint George, one of Hikitsuchi’s former students who trained in Shingu for 15 years, "Shingu bojutsu" consisted of four levels:

- Ikkyo — a fundamental solo form
- Nikyo — a solo form that explored circular movement
- Sankyo — a solo form that explored three-dimensional, spherical movement
- Yonkyo — Jiyuwaza — free, un-choreographed movement

Michio Hikitsuchi received his 10th dan in 1969, three months before Ueshiba's death. In a 1982 interview with Stanley Pranin published in Aikido Pioneers, Minoru Mochizuki stated that the Aikikai rejected Hikitsuchi's claim to having received his 10th dan as a result of a casual conversation with Ueshiba: Hikitsuchi brought his claim "to the Hombu and asked for certification. The family refused, saying that they did not give out gradings on that sort of criteria".

Hikitsuchi taught as chief instructor of Kumano Juku Dojo in Shingu, Japan until his death in February 2, 2004 aged 80. The dojo was founded by Ueshiba in 1953. Hikitsuchi traveled twice to the United States, and regularly to European countries, teaching at dojos that had been started by his students. American Aikido instructors who trained extensively under Hikitsuchi and the other senior instructors at Shingu include Mary Heiny (Seattle), Linda Holiday (Aikido of Santa Cruz), Jack Wada (Aikido of San Jose), Laurin Herr (San Francisco), Tom Read (Northcoast Aikido), John Smartt (New School Aikido), and Daniel Caslin (Aikido of Owensboro). His student Clint George is no longer teaching.)

Hikitsuchi was described by other teachers in Shingu as an "Aiki computer" because of his ability to recite virtually verbatim the speeches Ueshiba had given. He also had extensive knowledge of Shinto Norito (chanting) and the spiritual teachings of the Kojiki—areas of personal emphasis by his teacher, the founder of aikido. He passed this experiential knowledge of the Shinto Norito to Sensei Jack Wada, who demonstrates it regularly and passes it on to good students. Hikitsuchi's reverence for Ueshiba and his message was total.
