= Iwama Dōjō =

Coordinates: 36.293408°N 140.281023°E

The Iwama Dōjō is a dōjō built by the founder of aikido, Morihei Ueshiba, who lived there from 1942 until his death in 1969. It is located in the former town of Iwama and became an important historical location for the development of aikido and "a Mecca to the aikido community." This dojo is also where Morihiro Saito, one of the founder's closest students, learned and taught aikido from 1946 until 2002 developing what is often referred to as the Iwama Style.

Iwama was a small farming village in Japan, located 100 km north-east of Tokyo and at the centre of Ibaraki prefecture. Iwama was annexed into the City of Kasama in 2006 (dissolving Nishiibaraki County, which had previously contained Iwama Town). The original Iwama aikido dojo, Aiki Shrine and the neighbouring Tanrenkan are now addressed in the Yoshioka district of Kasama city, Ibaraki.

The Iwama dojo was significantly damaged in the 2011 earthquake. The Aiki Shrine and other dojos in former Iwama Town were also affected by the disaster.

== The Ibaraki Dojo ==
The Ibaraki Branch Dojo (茨城支部道場 Ibaraki Shibu Dojo), also known as the Ibaraki Dojo or the Shibu Dojo, is a small aikido dojo, run by the Aikikai Foundation.

The land on which the dojo and shrine were built was first purchased by Morihei Ueshiba, the founder of aikido, in 1940. In 1943 he built the first part of the current Aiki Jinja and an "outdoor dojo" where he lived a life of "Buno Ichinyo" (the union of agriculture and Budō). This dojo was completed in 1945 and was originally called "The Aiki Shuren Dojo" (合気修練道場, lit. harmonising drill dojo). At first the dojo did not include tatami mats, and students received training directly upon the wooden floor. Eventually 24 mats were installed. The dojo was later moved to the present day location and expanded to 60 mats. When the founder formally established the Aikikai for the promotion of aikido in 1948, the dojo served as the world headquarters for the art and remained so until the opening of the new Aikikai Hombu Dojo in 1956.

After the death of the aikido founder in 1969, Morihiro Saito became the caretaker and chief instructor at the Iwama Dojo and caretaker of the Aiki Shrine and remained so for more than thirty years. After Saito Shihan's death in May 2002, Moriteru Ueshiba became the default Dojo Chief while Saito's son, Hitohiro Saito, assumed the role of Acting Dojo Chief on behalf of the Dōshu. However, in November 2003, Hitohiro Sensei announced his departure from the Aikikai. Hitohiro's organisation was formed following his formal separation from the Aikikai in November 2003. This created a split among students of Morihiro Saito with some joining Hitohira Sensei's new organisation and others (most notably the three that Saitō had promoted to 7th dan, William Witt, Paolo Corallini, and Ulf Evenås) remaining affiliated with the Aikikai.

In December 2003, the dojo was renamed the Ibaraki Branch Dojo with Hiroshi Isoyama taking on the role of Acting Dojo Chief and Senior Instructor. Isoyama first began training in the Iwama dojo in 1949 at the age 12, as a direct student of the Morihei Ueshiba and the registration documents that he signed stated the name: "Daito-ryu Aiki-jujutsu". Isoyama's position was later taken over by Mitsuteru Ueshiba who then became the current Dojo Chief in place of his father in April 2015. Isoyama Shihan remains as chief instructor and Executive Advisor with support from Inagaki Shihan.

On 11 March 2011, the dojo was severely damaged by an earthquake and rendered unusable. Aikido practice continued in the Aiki Shrine from 14 March until 17 September 2011 when the newly repaired dojo reopened for training.

The Ibaraki Branch Dojo has nine regular local instructors, headed by Hiroshi Isoyama (8th dan), with the majority of the teaching (including the live-in student programme) being carried out by Shigemi Inagaki (8th Dan). Additionally, Dojo Chief Mitsuteru Ueshiba and Aikido Doshu Moriteru Ueshiba visit on Wednesdays and Saturdays respectively to teach the general class. General classes are held every day of the week for regular students while live-in students (内弟子 uchi deshi ) practise three times per day in addition to carrying out other duties such as maintaining the dojo and shrine precincts.

== Aiki Jinja ==
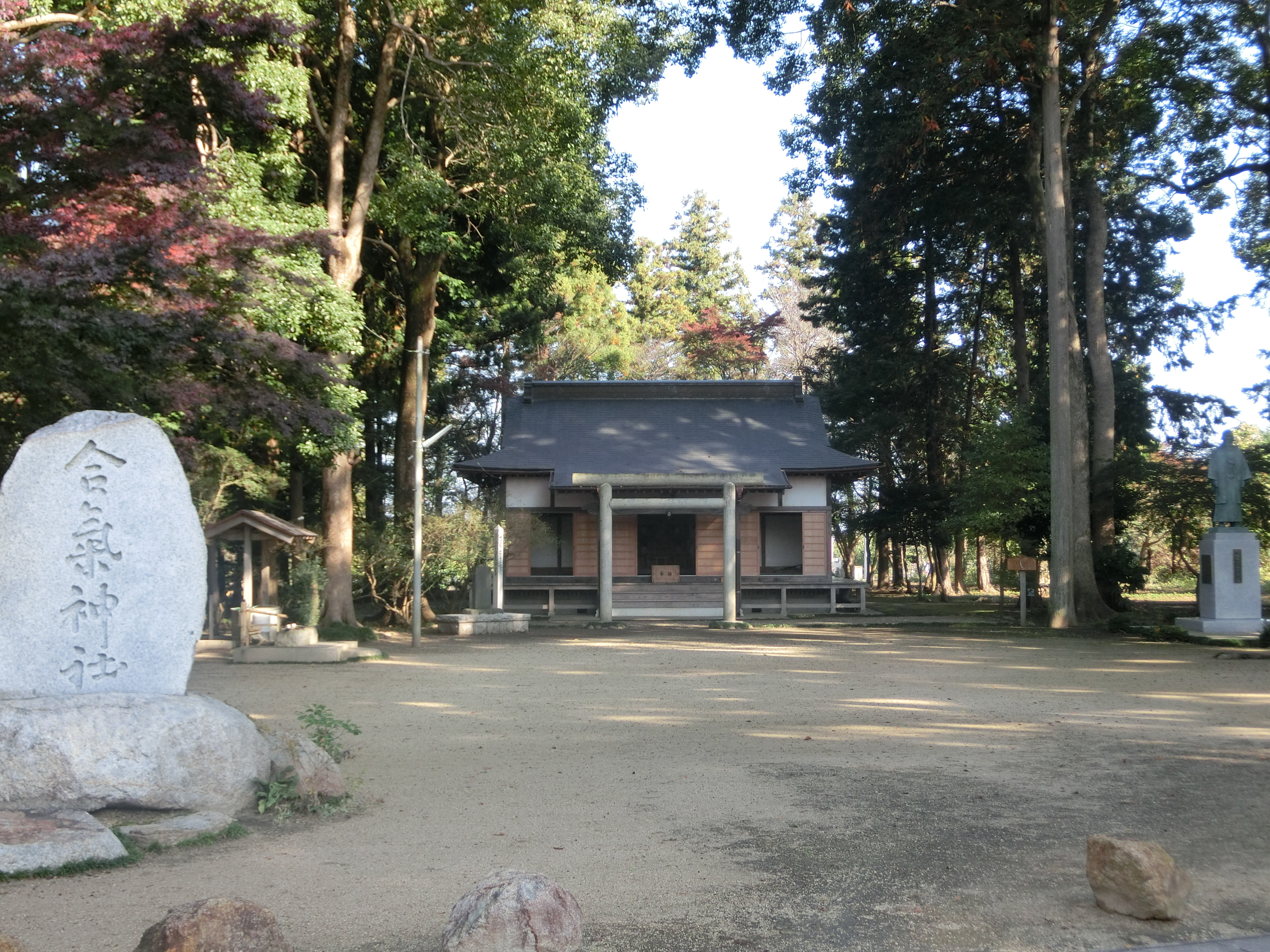
The Aiki Shrine in Iwama

Aiki Jinja (合気神社) is the shrine built by Morihei Ueshiba in Iwama in honor of the deities of aikido. The shrine grounds include the Ibaraki Branch dojo (training hall).

The 42 kami enshrined within the Aiki Jinja include Morihei Ueshiba's Guardian Gods, Saruta Hiko no Ookami, Kunitsu Ryuoh Kuzuryu, Daigongen, Tajikarao no mikoto, Amenomurakumo Kukisamuhara Ryuoh, Ketsumi Miko no Ookami, Wakumusubi no Mikoto, Ryuoh, Daigongen, Ootengu, Daibosatsu, and others.

The first part of the shrine building (the Honden or "Okuden" housing the deities of aikido) was completed in late autumn, 1943. The second bigger part (the Haiden) was erected in front of the Honden in 1962. Both parts were renovated by care-taker Morihiro Saito in 2001-2002 with the approval of Dōshu Moriteru Ueshiba. This renovation also included a fence set up around the compound, and a stone with the carvings "Aiki Jinja" designed by Seiseki Abe, a master of both calligraphy and Aikido, who was also the calligraphy teacher of Morihei Ueshiba. A large statue of the founder of aikido was erected in the shrine grounds and unveiled on 8 November 2009. Surplus material from this monument was used to make a bust of the founder which was unveiled at the newly rebuilt Iwama Station on 24 July 2012.

The Torii gate and Honden were damaged during the Great Tohoku earthquake. The relatively unscathed Haiden was used for aikido training while the dojo was unusable.

When Morihei Ueshiba was alive, once a month he would preside over what was initially a small religious ceremony in the Aiki Jinja called Tsukinamisai (月並み祭), which lasted up to an hour. Food offerings of fruits, vegetables, and fish adorned the kamidana. Later, a small party with the uchi deshi (live-in students) was held inside the dojo. After Ueshiba died, caretaker Morihiro Saito took responsibility for hosting the ceremony every month on the 14th. This tradition is kept up by current Dōshu Moriteru Ueshiba.

Every year on April 29 (the start of the Japanese Golden Week holiday), the annual shrine festival "Aiki Jinja Rei Taisai" (合気神社例大祭 "Grand Festival of the Aiki Shrine") is held by Oomoto priests in commemoration of Ueshiba's death on April 26, 1969. Under former caretaker Morihiro Saito, the event grew to become a very big day for the small town of Iwama. The festival has continued to attract hundreds of Aikido practitioners to the small dojo and shrine under current Dojo Chief Moriteru Ueshiba.

The Aiki Shrine Festival usually starts with a "shubatsu" (a Shinto ritual), "taisai-shukuji" (ritual felicitations) and "tamagushi-hoten" (offering of sacred sprigs) by the Ueshiba family and representatives from the aikido world and local community. The attendees then take part in a ritual prayer and memorial service offered by the Ueshiba family and other dignitaries. A special Shinto prayer called the "Amatsu Norito" is recited before the current Dōshu makes a speech and a ritual demonstration of Aikido called a "hōnō embu" (奉納演武) within the haiden of the shrine. The festival usually closes with "naorai" (a celebratory meal) in the dojo and surrounding gardens, often with the azaleas in bloom.

== Tanrenkan ==
Tanrenkan (鍛錬館) is an aikido training hall run by Hitohiro Saito, now Hitohira, who is the son of Morihiro Saito. It is the main dojo of the Iwama Shin-Shin Aiki Shuren-Kai organisation. The Tanrenkan was built in 2000 on Saito family land and exists independently of the original Iwama dojo.

== Other Iwama dojo ==
There are also other aikido dojos in former-Iwama:

- Shin-Shin Aiki Juku (神信合氣塾) is located 700 metres south-east from Tanrenkan. It is the old "Shin Dojo" built by Saito Morihiro Shihan. Uchi-deshi from Tanrenkan stay here.
- Nisshinkan is a small dojo operated by Nemoto Hiroki (Aikikai 7th dan) next to his "Aiki House" student accommodation.
- There is also aikido at Iwama Budokan (Martial Arts Hall). It is located at Iwama Junior High School, 1.3 km north-east from the founder's dojo. It is used by Watahiki (Ibaraki Branch), Nemoto and ISSASK.
