= Aiki (film) =

2002 Japanese film

- Film poster
- Directed by: Daisuke Tengan
- Written by: Daisuke Tengan
- Produced by: Hisao Iino; Shunsuke Koga; Yasushi Matsuda
- Starring: Haruhiko Katô; Rie Tomosaka; Chiaki Hara; Shōhei Hino
- Cinematography: Yi-shu Yi
- Edited by: Hirohide Abe
- Music by: Yôko Kumagai; Hidehiko Urayama
- Release date: August 30, 2002 (Venice)
- Running time: 119 minutes
- Country: Japan
- Language: Japanese

Aiki is a 2002 Japanese film about a martial artist in a wheelchair, directed and written by Daisuke Tengan. It is loosely based on the life of a Danish practitioner of the Roppokai branch of Daitō-ryū Aiki-jūjutsu, Ole Kingston Jensen, who started training in Daitō-ryū after he was handicapped in an accident and now is the highest ranking non-Japanese member of the Roppokai.

The film premiered at the 2002 Venice Film Festival.

== See also ==
- Aiki (martial arts principle)
