= Tadashi Abe =

Japanese aikido teacher (1926-1984)

- Born: 1926
- Died: November 23, 1984 (aged 57–58)
- Native name: 阿部 正
- Style: Aikido
- Teacher: Morihei Ueshiba

Tadashi Abe (阿部 正, Abe Tadashi) (1926 – November 23, 1984) was the first aikido teacher to live and teach in the West. He began training in Aikido in Osaka in 1942 and went on to train directly under the founder of the art Morihei Ueshiba at Iwama as an uchideshi during World War II. In 1952, after graduating in law from Waseda University, he moved to France where he studied law at the Sorbonne and taught aikido as a 6th Dan representative of the Aikikai. After seven years, he returned to Japan. By 1964 he held the rank of 7th dan.

Aikido had been introduced into France a year earlier by Minoru Mochizuki during a visit, but it was Tadashi Abe's teaching at the judo dojo of Mikonosuke Kawaishi where aikido was first taught on a regular basis in the West.

In his beginning years in aikido, Abe had been very keen on ascertaining the martial effectiveness of the art. He wrote two books on aikido in French, and a scathing letter in critique of Koichi Tohei´s decision to break from the Aikikai and start his own Ki Society. He was the cousin of New York Aikikai chief instructor Yoshimitsu Yamada.
