= Stanley Pranin =

American martial artist (1945–2017)

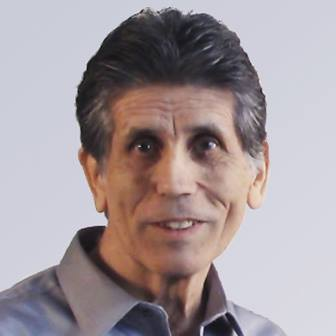
- Stanley Pranin
- Born: July 24, 1945; Los Angeles, California, U.S.
- Died: March 7, 2017 (aged 71); Las Vegas, Nevada, U.S.
- Occupation: Publisher
- Writing career
- Period: 1974–2017
- Subject: Aikido

Stanley A. Pranin (July 24, 1945 – March 7, 2017) was an American martial artist, founding publisher, and editor-in-chief of Aikido Journal (formerly Aiki News). Pranin, a researcher and archivist of aikido, has written and published several books and many articles about aikido, Daito-ryu Aikijujutsu, and Morihei Ueshiba and was an influential figure in the aikido world.

Pranin originally began practicing Yoshinkan aikido in California in 1962, later switching to Aikikai. During the late 1960s and early 1970s, he taught aikido in California. In 1974, Pranin founded the journal Aiki News; in 1977 he moved to Japan, living there for 20 years and continuing to publish his journal in Japanese and English. Aiki News evolved into Aikido Journal, currently a web publication with resources on Aikido, Daito-ryu and related subjects.

Stanley Pranin died of advanced stomach cancer on March 7, 2017, in Las Vegas, Nevada.

== Aikido career ==
=== Early years ===
In 1962 Pranin saw an aikido demonstration at his high school in the San Pedro neighborhood of Los Angeles, and in August of that year he began practicing Yoshinkan aikido in Lomita with 2nd Dan Virgil Crank. He continued his training in 1963 under Isao Takahashi and Richard Taylor at the San Pedro YMCA, following the Koichi Tohei-led curriculum. Pranin passed tests for 1st Dan (in August 1965) and 2nd Dan (in 1967) given by Tohei. After receiving a master's degree from the University of California, Los Angeles in 1968, he began doctoral studies at the University of California, Berkeley and shared teaching duties at the university's Aikido Club with Robert Frager.

With a letter of recommendation from Rod Kobayashi, Pranin visited Japan for the first time in June 1969 and spent the summer practicing at the Aikikai Hombu dojo in Tokyo. He attended classes taught by Kisshomaru Ueshiba, Koichi Tohei, Kisaburo Osawa, Seigo Yamaguchi, Yasuo Kobayashi and Morihiro Saito, and practiced at Shoji Nishio's dojo in Sugamo.

Inducted into the US Army in October 1969, Pranin was stationed in Eritrea (then part of Ethiopia). Working as a translator, he set up an aikido club at the US Army communications base in Asmara. Transferred after 18 months to the Defense Language Institute in Monterey, California, Pranin worked as an assistant French instructor. He audited Japanese classes at the institute and taught aikido at the nearby University of California, Santa Cruz with Robert Frager.

After his discharge from the army in October 1972, Pranin briefly returned to the University of California, Berkeley as a graduate student. During the summer of 1973, he began teaching aikido classes at a judo school in Monterey. That year, he was promoted to 3rd Dan by the California Aikido Association.

In May 1974, representing Northern California aikido schools with William Witt, Pranin attended a meeting in Los Angeles at which Koichi Tohei announced his resignation from the Aikikai Hombu Dojo in Tokyo. Delegates were asked to instruct their organizations to remain in the Aikikai or join Tohei's Shin Shin Toitsu Aikido organization.

Pranin opened an aikido school in Monterey in 1975. The following year, he turned its operation over to senior students and resumed doctoral studies at the University of California, Berkeley. During this period, Pranin taught aikido at schools in Oakland and San Jose.

He and other Northern California instructors participated in the establishment of the Aikido of Northern California Yudansha Kai in 1974. As a delegate of the organization, Pranin attended the first International Aikido Federation (IAF) congress in Tokyo in September 1976. He received his 4th Dan certification in January 1977.

=== Training and research in Japan ===
Pranin moved to Japan in August 1977, studying aikido under Morihiro Saito in Iwama. In May 1978, he interviewed Kisshomaru Ueshiba for the publication of Morihei Ueshiba, Founder of Aikido, his Japanese-language biography of his father. Pranin interviewed Ueshiba more than ten times, the last in December 1996.

In 1979, he discovered a 1935 16mm film of Morihei Ueshiba in a Tokyo film repository. That year Pranin interviewed Kenji Tomiki, creator of a competitive form of aikido, for a second time. In July 1981 he discovered Budo, a 1938 training manual by Morihei Ueshiba, while interviewing Zenzaburo Akazawa. Pranin was promoted to 5th Dan by Morihiro Saito in 1983.

Two years later, he interviewed Tokimune Takeda (son of Sokaku Takeda) for the first time during a trip to Hokkaido. Pranin visited Abashiri, Shirataki and Engaru while researching Morhei Ueshiba's years in Hokkaido (1912–1919). Ueshiba began studying Daito-ryu Jujutsu with Takeda in 1915, and modified Daito-ryu techniques are the basis of the modern aikido curriculum. Ueshiba's association with Takeda lasted over 20 years, and Pranin's published research was instrumental in establishing the role of Daito-ryu Jujutsu in the creation of aikido.

From 1985 to 1989 he accompanied Morihiro Saito abroad as an interpreter at Aikido seminars, primarily in the US and Europe. Pranin promoted his teacher in his magazines and events. His association with Saito, which included the publication of several books and videotapes, lasted until the latter's death in 2002.

Pranin interviewed Noriaki (Yoichiro) Inoue, nephew of Morihei Ueshiba and an early Aiki Budo pioneer in Tokyo, several times in 1987–88. Inoue's father, Zenzo Inoue, married Ueshiba's eldest sister Tame. Zenzo and Ueshiba's father, Yoroku, influenced and financed Morihei Ueshiba during his early years. Inoue's uncle, Koshiro Inoue, was a longtime patron of Ueshiba before World War II. Pranin's research into the relationship between the Ueshiba and Inoue families changed the historical account of Morihei Ueshiba's early years.

During his 20 years living and researching in Japan, Pranin conducted over 200 interviews. The Aikido Journal audio archives house over 700 hours of audio recordings, much of which have been edited and published in Aiki News and Aikido Journal. Pranin has collected hundreds of hours of film and video recordings, a portion of which have been edited and published. Aikido Journal's photo collection includes over 100,000 images, including several thousand of Morihei Ueshiba.

== Publishing ==
=== Aiki News and Aikido Journal ===
In Monterey, Pranin and Katsuaki Terasawa began translating Japanese-language serialized articles about Morihei Ueshiba published in the Tokyo Times in 1966. Positive response to the translations led to the creation of Aiki News, a small newsletter combining the translated articles with local aikido news, in April 1974. For the next three years, Pranin published early interviews with Morihiro Saito, Kisaburo Osawa, Frank Doran and William Witt, translations of Japanese aikido documents and US-related events in Aiki News. After moving to Japan in 1977 he continued publishing the newsletter, adopting a bilingual Japanese-English format in 1978.

In 1991, Pranin's publication split into two magazines: Aiki News in Japanese and Aikido Journal in English. The latter was published until spring 2000, ending 26 years of print publication with issue 119. Aiki News was published in Japanese until 2005, when it was renamed Dou Magazine under editor-in-chief Ikuko Kimura and its focus shifted from aikido coverage.

Aikido Journal became an online publication at aikidojournal.com in 2000. The website contains extensive content (much from print editions of the magazine) and many Aikido-related photos and videos.

=== Books ===
- The Aiki News Encyclopedia of Aikido (Aiki News, 1989 and 1991, Tokyo): Reference work, now out of print. Much of its content, with minor updates, is at aikidojournal.com.
- Aikido Masters: Prewar Students of Morihei Ueshiba vol. 1 (Aiki News, 1993, Tokyo): Interviews with 14 students of Morihei Ueshiba between 1926 and 1942 by Pranin and the Aiki News staff
- Daito-ryu Aikijujutsu: Conversations with Daito-ryu Masters (Aiki News, 1996, Tokyo): Traces the history of Daito-ryu Aikijujutsu through interviews with seven masters and an overview of its history and founder, Takeda Sōkaku
- Aikido Pioneers – Prewar Era (Aiki News, 2010, Tokyo): Revised, expanded version of Aikido Masters with 20 interviews by Pranin over a 30-year period with students and associates of Morihei Ueshiba.
- 1994–2001 Takemusu Aikido (six volumes): Series of comprehensive technical volumes by Morihiro Saito published by Aiki News. The first volume is co-authored with Pranin, who wrote a historical introduction to the sixth volume.

== Events and teaching ==
=== Athletic Circus ===
In July 1963, Pranin was a member of a YMCA committee which organized an Athletic Circus with aikido, powerlifting and a bodybuilding exhibition by Bill Pearl. The event took place in San Pedro, with Pranin participating in the aikido demonstration and powerlifting events.

=== Friendship demonstrations ===
In April 1985, Pranin organized the first Aiki News Friendship Demonstration in Tokyo. Six aikido teachers participated in the event. The demonstration was controversial, since it was organized by Aiki News (a private entity). Additional demonstrations were organized in 1986, 1987 and 1988.

=== Shinei Taido demonstration ===
Pranin organized a 1988 public demonstration in Tokyo of Shinei Taido, created by Noriaki (Yoichiro) Inoue—a nephew of Morihei Ueshiba, an early collaborator with Ueshiba and a prewar pioneer.

=== Aiki Expos ===
Aiki Expos were martial-arts seminars, organized by Pranin, which assembled high-ranking teachers of aikido, Daito-ryu Aikijujutsu, classical Japanese martial arts, karate and Systema. The expos, which included demonstrations, encouraged participants to cross-train in other disciplines. They were held in 2002 and 2003 in Las Vegas and in 2005 in Los Angeles.

=== Films, videos and DVDs ===
Since beginning his research, Pranin has collected and filmed many hours of film and video of aikido teachers beginning with founder Morihei Ueshiba. The Aikido Journal archives include more than 30 films of Ueshiba. Other teachers documented by Pranin are Morihiro Saito, Shoji Nishio, Noriaki (Yoichiro) Inoue, Koichi Tohei, Seigo Yamaguchi and Rinjiro Shirata.

Pranin's major events are recorded on video, and he has collected and filmed many hours of footage over several decades from the All-Japan Aikido Demonstrations sponsored by the Aikikai Hombu Dojo in Tokyo. Edited footage has been marketed by Aiki News and Aikido Journal in a number of formats.

=== Lectures and seminars ===
Pranin has lectured on aikido history and the life of founder Morihei Ueshiba in the US, Mexico, France and Japan. He has conducted aikido seminars, and released an online video course (The Zone Theory of Aikido) in 2013.
