= Hitohiro Saito =

Japanese aikidoka (born 1957)

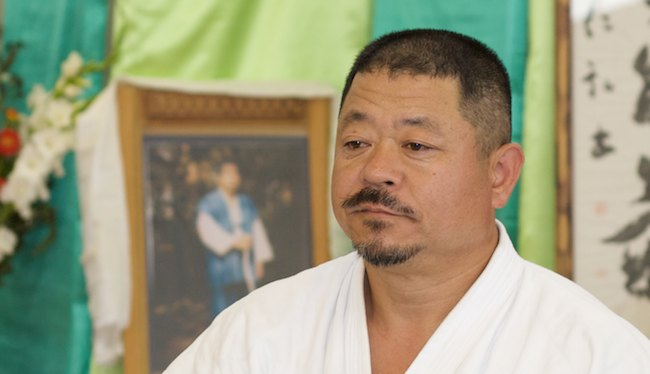
- SAITO Hitohiro Sensei in Portugal by 2008
- Born: 12 February 1957 (age 69); Iwama, Japan
- Native name: 斎藤 仁弘 Saitō Hitohiro
- Nationality: (Japan) Japanese
- Style: Aikido
- Teachers: Morihei Ueshiba and Morihiro Saito

Hitohiro Saito (斎藤 仁弘 Saitō Hitohiro, born 12 February 1957 in Iwama) is an aikido instructor and founding headmaster of Iwama Shin-Shin Aiki Shuren-kai. Hitohiro is the son of Morihiro Saito. At age seven, he started to learn aikido from Morihei Ueshiba, the founder of aikido, who cared for him as a grandson.. After Ueshiba died in 1969, he continued his practice with his father. The younger Saito became an official instructor of the Iwama dojo in 1986 and remained so until 2004 when he separated from the Aikikai organization and formed his own group. Since 2009 he is also identified as Hitohira (仁平) Saito.

== Personal history ==
Years before his father's death, Hitohiro took over the main work at the Founder's dojo and Shrine of Aiki, Aiki Jinja, thus relieving his aging father of the great amount of work required in running the campus. His father spent his last years taking care of the vegetable gardens and travelling abroad for seminars. The main teaching of the dojo was passed to Hitohiro's hands and remained so until 2004. In 2000, he inaugurated his own dojo, the Tanrenkan (鍛錬館), sponsored by his father Morihiro Saito. Upon his father's death, Hitohiro inherited his house and his dojo, then called the "Shin Dojo", built in 1990.

== Iwama Shin-Shin Aiki Shuren-kai ==
Hitohiro Saito is the founder and leader of a traditional Iwama style aikido organization. It is named Iwama Shin-Shin Aiki Shuren-kai (岩間神信合氣修練会, abbreviated as ISSASK). It has dojo in about 20 countries.

With the passing of Morihiro Saito in May 2002, Hitohiro Saito initially continued to govern the Founder's dojo and the Shrine of Aikido, Aikijinja. He also prepared to surrender these roles to the Aikikai, which owns those properties. However, the Dōshu also requested that Iwama Ryu grading certificates no longer be issued, and in return Hitohiro asked for the Aikikai to announce in publication that the Founder's original style is preserved at Iwama. The latter did not occur, and Hitohiro also came under pressures within the Iwama group. In November 2003, Hitohiro separated from the Aikikai. By February 2004 he had formed his own organisation (ISSASK).

While a number of Morihiro Saito's students preferred to remain affiliated with the Aikikai, others decided to follow Hitohiro Saito upon his break from the organization. Today he teaches full-time at his own Tanrenkan and travels constantly inside Japan and around the world, instructing at seminars attended by hundreds of aikido students each month.

== Aikido style ==
Saito's Aikido is known for being precise, austere and dynamic; he emphasizes aiki-jō and aiki-ken. As a teacher he is demanding, always insisting in the deep studies of the basis of Aikido as the only way to get to understand the Aikido of the Founder and of his father Morihiro Saito.

== Personal life ==
Saito is also a professional chef, calligrapher, painter, and sculptor. In his atelier, he carves mostly traditional Japanese masks and shishigashira (獅子頭, lion masks). His wife and children also practice daily at his dojo, and in 2016 his sons began teaching Aikido seminars internationally.
