= Aiki-ken =

Set of Japanese sword techniques

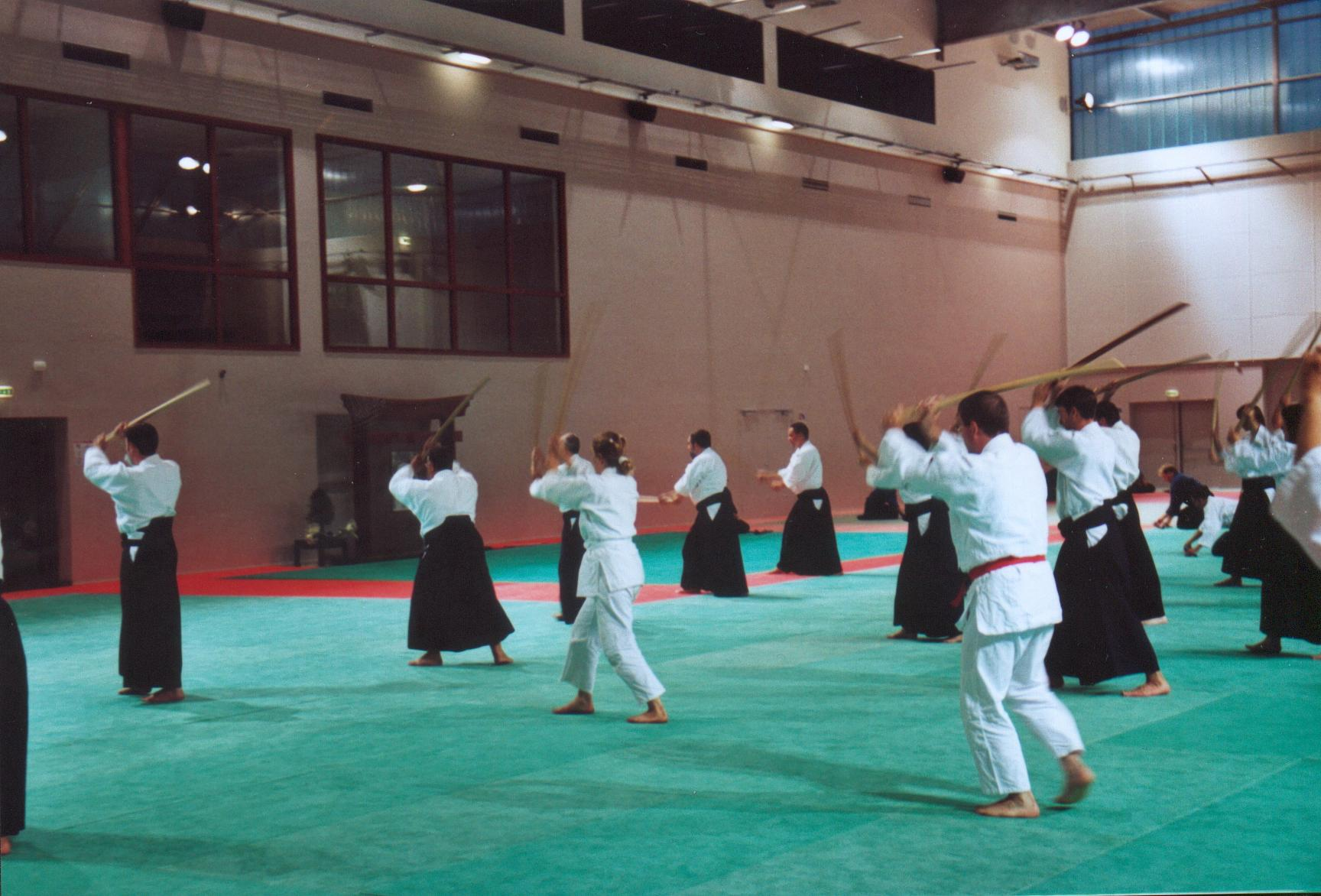
Aiki-ken training during a 2006 international seminar at Lesneven Aikido, in Lesneven, France.

Aiki-ken (Kanji: 合気剣 Hiragana: あいきけん) is the name given specifically to the set of Japanese sword techniques practiced according to the principles of aikido, taught first by Morihei Ueshiba (aikido's founder), then further developed by Morihiro Saito, one of Ueshiba's most prominent students. Currently, Iwama Shin-Shin Aiki Shuren-kai is the main proponent organization.

== Development ==
Much of the aiki-ken syllabus was developed by Morihei Ueshiba (植芝 盛平 Ueshiba Morihei, 1883–1969) at his dojo in Iwama, Japan, at the same time he developed aikido's staff training (called aiki-jō). It is well documented that Ueshiba studied several different styles of kenjutsu (Japanese swordsmanship), but the aiki-ken techniques are predominantly based upon the teachings of the Kashima Shintō-ryu.

The practice of aiki-ken is not pervasive. Some schools of aikido incorporate weapons training that is unrelated to aiki-ken, and others forego weapons training entirely.

== Practice ==
Much of aiki-ken bears little similarity to other modern sword arts. Rather than learning to "fight" with swords, the primary purpose of aiki-ken is to magnify errors in one's aikido technique, and to give the student an opportunity to apply the principles of aikido in different situations. Aiki-ken is practiced using bokken (a wooden katana) and has a wide variety of techniques. Saito codified two sets of techniques, the first being seven suburi (solo cutting exercises), and the second being five partnered forms. Some dojo also practice jiyu-waza armed with bokken (freestyle technique, without a predetermined form of attack and response).

=== Suburi ===
Suburi (素振り:すぶり), meaning "practice-swinging", is used to refer to the basic solo movements of aiki-ken, developed as a distillation of the partnered practice.

There are seven aiki-ken suburi in Saito's tradition, and are very simply named as follows:

1. Ichi-no: A simple downward vertical cut.
2. Ni-no: Step back into jōdan-no-kamae, then a downward vertical cut.
3. San-no: Step back into waki-gamae, then a downward vertical cut.
4. Yon-no: Step forward with a downward vertical cut; repeat.
5. Go-no: Step forward while guarding, then a 70-degree downward cut; repeat.
6. Roku-no: Step forward with a downward vertical cut, then shuffle forward and thrust.
7. Shichi-no: Step forward while guarding, then a 70-degree downward cut, then step forward and thrust.

=== Kumitachi ===
The partnered forms practice of aiki-ken is called kumitachi (組太刀:くみたち), meaning sword practice with a partner. There are five kumitachi in Saito's aiki-ken curriculum. The kumitachi teach students how to alternately control the center line and move off it to avoid attacks and how to blend with an opponent's attacks, among other skills.

1. Ichi-no-tachi (一の太刀): first of sword
2. Ni-no-tachi (二の太刀): second of sword
3. San-no-tachi (三の太刀): third of sword
4. Yon-no-tachi (四の太刀): fourth of sword
5. Go-no-tachi (五の太刀): fifth of sword
6. Kimusubi-no-tachi (気結びの太刀): blending one's energy with partner of sword

Improvisational variations on the kumitachi (called henka), which generally cause the kumitachi form to end early with one person taking advantage of an opening to strike or throw and take the sword of the other, are also taught.

== See also ==
- Aiki (martial arts principle)
