= Aiki-jō =

Set of martial art techniques

Aiki-jō (Kanji: 合気杖 Hiragana: あいきじょう) is the name given specifically to the set of martial art techniques practiced with a jō (a wooden staff about four feet long), according to the principles of aikido. Jō techniques were introduced into aikido by Morihei Ueshiba, aikido's founder, and further developed by Morihiro Saito, one of Ueshiba's most prominent students.

== Development of aiki-jō ==
Much of the aiki-jō syllabus was developed by Morihei Ueshiba (植芝 盛平 Ueshiba Morihei, 1883–1969) at his dojo in Iwama, Japan, at the same time he developed aikido's sword training (called aiki-ken). It is well documented that Ueshiba studied several different styles of martial arts, including the art of the spear (sōjutsu) and the modern art of the bayonet or "Jūkendō". The aiki-jō techniques taught by Ueshiba were a distillation and modification of that training, with an emphasis upon the use of the jō as a method for the refinement of one's empty-handed aikido techniques. Some practitioners of traditional Japanese martial arts have noted that aiki-jō techniques bear more resemblance to jukendo (bayonet fighting, which Ueshiba studied during the Russo-Japanese War) than to classical Japanese spear Sōjutsu and staff Bōjutsu systems.

Note that the practice of Aiki-jō is not universal. Some schools of aikido incorporate weapons training that is unrelated to aiki-jō, and others cast aside weapons training entirely.

== Aiki-jō practice ==
Aiki-jō practice can help uncover errors in the student's empty-handed aikido technique, and provides an opportunity to apply the principles of aikido in different situations. Saito codified three sets of techniques, the first being twenty suburi (solo cutting exercises), the second being ten partnered forms, and the third being two kata (solo forms). Some dojo also practice jiyu-waza armed with jō (a freestyle technique without a predetermined form of attack and response).

=== Suburi ===
Suburi (素振り:すぶり), a word that translates literally to something like "elementary swinging", is used to refer to the basic solo movements of aiki-jō, developed by Saito as a distillation of the forms and partnered practice.

There are twenty aiki-jō suburi. They are divided into sub-groups and named as follows (the English given is an approximate translation):

Five Thrusting (tsuki) Movements

1. Direct thrust (choku-tsuki)
2. Counter thrust (返し突き, kaeshi-tsuki)
3. Rear thrust (後ろ突き, ushiro-tsuki)
4. Thrust, low counter (突き下段返し, tsuki gedan-gaeshi)
5. Thrust, high counter strike (突き上段返し打ち, tsuki jōdan-gaeshi-uchi)

Five Striking (打ち, uchi) Movements

6. Front-of-the-head stepping strike (正面打ち込み, shōmen'uchikomi)
7. Repeating stepping strike (連続打ち込み, renzoku uchikomi)
8. Head strike, low counter (面打ち下段返し, men'uchi gedan-gaeshi)
9. Head strike, rear thrust (面打ち後ろ突き, men'uchi ushiro-tsuki)
10. Reverse side-of-the-head strike, rear thrust (逆横面後ろ突き, gyaku-yoko'men ushiro-tsuki)

Three One-handed (片手, katate) Movements

11. One-handed low counter (片手下段返し, katate gedan-gaeshi)
12. One-handed distant-interval strike (片手遠間打ち, katate tōma-uchi)
13. One-handed "figure-eight" counter (片手八の字返し, katate hachi-no-ji gaeshi)

Five "Figure-eight" (八相, hassō) Movements

14. "Figure-eight" counter, strike (八相返し打ち, hassō-gaeshi uchi)
15. "Figure-eight" counter, thrust (八相返し突き, hassō-gaeshi tsuki)
16. "Figure-eight" counter, rear thrust (八相返し後ろ突き, hassō-gaeshi ushiro-tsuki)
17. "Figure-eight" counter, rear strike (八相返し後ろ打ち, hassō-gaeshi ushiro-uchi)
18. "Figure-eight" counter, rear sweep (八相返し後ろ払い, hassō-gaeshi ushiro-barai)

Two Flowing (流れ, nagare) Movements

19. Left flowing counter strike (左流れ返し打ち, hidari nagare-gaeshi-uchi)
20. Right flowing counter thrust (右流れ返し突き, migi nagare-gaeshi-tsuki)

=== Kumijō ===
The partnered forms practice of aiki-jō is called kumijō (組杖), meaning the crossing/meeting of staves. There are ten kumijō in Saito's aiki-jō curriculum. Ueshiba originally taught various partnered drills and techniques with the jō, and Saito originally codified them into a discrete series of seven such partner drills. In 1983, Saito was set to give a public demonstration, and so devised three more kumijō at that time.

The kumijō teach students how to alternately control the center line and move off of it to avoid attacks as well as how to blend with an opponent's attacks, among other skills. Improvisational variations on the kumijō (called henka), which generally cause the kumijō form to end early with one person taking advantage of an opening to strike or throw the other, are also taught.

=== Kata ===
Kata, simply meaning "forms", are typically solo, using a predetermined series of techniques practiced against an imaginary opponent. In the aiki-jō curriculum, there are three primary kata. The first is called "Sanjūichi no Jō", generally referred to in English as the "Thirty-one Point Jō Kata", and was taught by Ueshiba. The second one is "Jūsan no Jō"; "Thirteen Point Jō Kata". The third one is "Roku no jō". There are also well known partnered versions of these forms, called bunkai.

== See also ==
- Aiki (martial arts principle)
