= Hiroshi Isoyama =

Isoyama Hiroshi
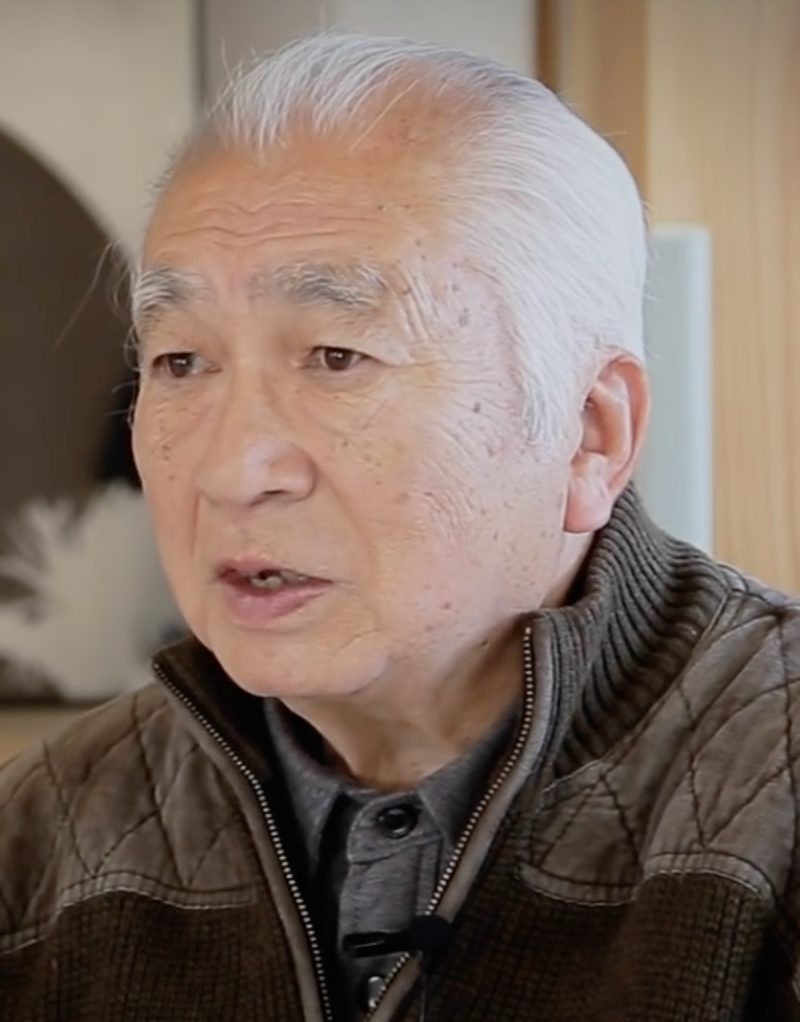
- Born: January 14, 1937; Iwama, Ibaraki Prefecture, Japan
- Native name: 磯山博
- Style: Aikido
- Teacher: Morihei Ueshiba
- Rank: 8th dan

Hiroshi Isoyama (磯山博, Isoyama Hiroshi) is a Japanese teacher of the martial art of aikido. He began training in the Iwama Dojo at the age of 12 as a direct student of the founder of aikido, Morihei Ueshiba in June 1949. He currently holds the rank of 8th dan shihan in the Aikikai and is that organization's Technical Councillor. Isoyama was made the acting head of the Iwama dojo on behalf of Ueshiba Moriteru following the passing of Morihiro Saito. He currently remains as Executive Advisor and senior instructor of that dojo.

Over a long career in the martial arts, he has been Chief of Defensive Tactics for the Japan Self Defense Force Academy, and also instructed the U.S. Army in self-defense tactics. He joined the Air Self-Defense Forces in 1958 and was sent to Chitose. His first students were members of the American military police and eventually included members of his own country's forces.

Along with Hiroshi Tada, Isoyama formed a committee for the construction of a large statue of the founder of aikido in the precincts of the Aiki Shrine, which was unveiled on 8 November 2009. Funding was mainly obtained via a call for donations and surplus material from this monument was used to make a bust of the founder which was unveiled at the newly rebuilt Iwama Station on 24 July 2012.

Isoyama is also known as one of martial arts and movie star Steven Seagal's main teachers.

Before retiring, Isoyama Shihan also served for many years as a Senior Council Member for the International Aikido Federation (appointed by IAF president) and he is notably responsible for the introduction of demonstrations at the end of each congress.
