= Takashi Aiki =

Japanese baseball player

- Pitcher
- Born: May 16, 1978 (age 47); Kumamoto, Japan
- Bats: Right Throws: Right

debut
- July 21, 2002, for the Orix BlueWave

Career statistics (through 2008)
- Win–loss–tie: 5–13–1
- ERA: 5.65
- Strikeouts: 104
- Stats at Baseball Reference

Teams
- Orix BlueWave/Orix Buffaloes (2002 – 2005); Hanshin Tigers (2006 – 2007)

Takashi Aiki (相木 崇, Aiki Takashi; born May 16, 1978 in Kumamoto, Japan) is a retired Nippon Professional Baseball player. He played for the Orix Buffaloes and the Hanshin Tigers.
