= Kazuo Iwama =

Kazuo Iwama may refer to:

- Kazuo Iwama (Sony) (岩間 和夫, 1919–1982), president of the Sony Corporation
- Kazuo Iwama (political scientist) (岩間 一雄, born 1936)
- Kazuo Iwama (computer scientist) (岩間 一雄, born 1951), Japanese computer science researcher
