= Aikido concepts =

Concepts of the Japanese martial art

Aikido concepts are ideas that form the philosophical or technical basis of the Japanese martial art aikido.

== Aiki ==
Aiki (合氣) means the defender blends without clashing with the attacker, then goes on to dominate the assailant through the application of internal strength or Ki energy to effect techniques. Blending with an attacker's movements allows the Aiki practitioner to control the actions of the attacker with minimal effort.

== Hanmi ==
Hanmi (半身, half body) describes the idea that the sides of the body work as a unit (for example: left hand and left foot forward). Usually, though not exclusively, descriptive of the movement in Aikido. Closely related to the development of Chushin-ryoku.

Often used to refer to the triangular stance (kamae) of Aikido. Similar stances and the same word are used in other martial arts and traditional theater, including sumo and kyōgen.

== Chūshin-ryoku ==
Chūshin-ryoku (中心力, center of power).

== Chūshin-sen ==
Chūshin-sen (中心線, center line). The term is also associated with kendo.

== Ichi-go ichi-e ==
Ichi-go ichi-e (一期一会, one time, one meeting) describes a cultural concept often linked with tea master Sen no Rikyū. The term is often translated as "for this time only", "never again", or "one chance in a lifetime". Ichi-go ichi-e is linked with Zen Buddhism and concepts of transience. The term is particularly associated with the Japanese tea ceremony, and is often brushed onto scrolls which are hung in the tea room. In the context of tea ceremony, ichi-go ichi-e reminds participants that each tea meeting is unique.

== Irimi ==
Irimi (入り身, putting in the body) describes entering straight into a technique, as opposed to the more indirect entrance into technique called tenkan. Irimi usually looks like a step forward, straight or at an angle but usually ending with the body facing the attacker, rather than in the direction of the step. To enter with irimi, the defender needs to move in the very moment of the attack or even himself initiate it.

== Katsu hayabi ==
Katsu hayabi (勝速日, victory at the speed of light) means a victory that comes very quickly, winning at the speed of light.

== Kokyū-Ryoku ==
Kokyū-Ryoku (呼吸力, Breath Power) Is the concept of relaxed power generated from the tanden. There is an implication in the word kokyū that this type of power does not clash with uke.

== Kuzushi ==
Kuzushi (崩し, unbalancing) is the Japanese term for unbalancing an opponent in the martial arts. The noun comes from the intransitive verb, kuzusu, meaning to level, pull down, or demolish. As such, it refers to not just an unbalancing, but the process of getting an opponent into a position where his stability, and hence ability to regain compromised balance, is destroyed.

== Maai ==
Maai (間合い) refers to the space between two opponents in combat. It is a complex concept, incorporating not just the distance between opponents, but also the time it will take to cross the distance, angle and rhythm of attack. It is specifically the exact position from which one opponent can strike the other, after factoring in the above elements. For example, a faster opponent's maai is farther away than a slower opponent. It is ideal for one opponent to maintain maai while preventing the other from doing so.

== Masakatsu agatsu ==
Masakatsu agatsu (正勝吾勝, true victory (is) self victory) is a 4 character compound expressing a concept in Japanese martial arts, particularly aikido, referring to the true victory of self-mastery. It was a common saying of aikido founder Morihei Ueshiba which emphasizes that aikido is not a competitive martial art like judo or taekwondo.

== Shinmu fusatsu ==
Shinmu fusatsu (真武不殺, true budo does not kill) states that in aikido one should not kill the opponent. It is related to the kenjutsu concepts of satsuninto (殺人刀 the sword that takes life; also satsujinken 殺人剣) and katsujinken (活人剣 the sword that gives life).

== Taisabaki ==
Taisabaki (体捌き, handling well the body) relates to 'whole body movement', or repositioning. It can be translated as body-management. It is a term used widely in kendo, jujutsu, aikido, judo, karate and ninjutsu. Tai sabaki is usually used to avoid an attack, such that the receiver of the attack ends up in an advantageous position and it is often wrongly referred to as "evasion."

== Takemusu ==
Takemusu (武産) was the concept developed by Morihei Ueshiba of how the ultimate martial art should be, how his aikido should be, an art which may harmonize all living beings and free techniques could be spontaneously executed.

In his later years, Ueshiba developed the more spiritual aspects of his art and even adopted the name Takemusu Tsunemori, under which he left many paintings and poems.

== Tenkan ==
Tenkan (転換, convert or divert) is a 180-degree pivot to one's rear, on the lead foot.

== Zanshin ==
Zanshin (残心, remaining mind) refers to a state of awareness – of relaxed alertness. The literal translation of zanshin is "remaining mind". Zanshin sometimes refers more narrowly to the body's posture after a technique is executed.

== Yamabiko ==
Yamabiko (山彦) The concept of calling out the attack rather than waiting for the attacker. The term presumably comes from a poem by the founder.

It is loosely related to the concept of Sasoi (誘い) or of inviting the attack.
