= Morihiro Saito =

Japanese aikido teacher (1928–2002)

- Born: 31 March 1928; Ibaraki Prefecture, Japan
- Died: 13 May 2002 (aged 74); Iwama, Ibaraki Prefecture, Japan; Cancer
- Native name: 斉藤 守弘 Saitō Morihiro
- Nationality: Japanese
- Style: Aikido
- Teacher: Morihei Ueshiba
- Rank: Shihan, 9th dan

Other information
- Notable relatives: Hitohiro Saito

Morihiro Saito (斉藤 守弘 Saitō Morihiro, 31 March 1928 – 13 May 2002) was a teacher of the Japanese martial art of aikido, with many students around the world. Saito's practice of aikido spanned 56 years, from the age of 18, when he first met aikido founder Morihei Ueshiba, until his death in 2002.

== Early life ==
Morihiro Saito was born in Ibaraki Prefecture, Japan, on 31 March 1928. Growing up in a poor farming village in the 1930s and early 40s, he recounted having the same interest in historical heroes such as Yagyū Jūbei Mitsuyoshi and Goto Matabe as most other Japanese boys. In the Japanese schools at that time, the martial arts of kendo and judo were taught to students, and Saito chose to study kendo.

In the years immediately following the end of World War II, the carrying of weapons of any kind, as well the practice of martial arts, was prohibited by the GHQ. As a result, Saito felt he should study some kind of unarmed self-defense technique, and began training in Shinto-ryū karate at the Shudokan in Meguro. After a short time, his work with the Japanese National Railways transferred him to Iwama, and he was forced to find other martial arts training. Thinking judo would be a useful complement to his kendo and karate skills, he began training at a judo dojo in Ishioka. In the summer of 1946, however, Saito heard stories about an "old man doing strange techniques up on the mountain near Iwama." It seemed that people were confused about what martial art, exactly, this old man was practicing, but one judo instructor said the man was teaching "Ueshiba-ryū Judo."

=== Meeting aikido's founder ===
By July 1946, the GHQ-imposed ban upon the practice of martial arts had forced Morihei Ueshiba into an official "retirement" from practice for several years. Ueshiba took this opportunity to seclude himself in the small town of Iwama, and was engaged in the practice of ascetic training (shugyō), and some believe that it was during this period that Ueshiba was perfecting the practice of aikido.

It was at this time, at the age of 18, that Saito joined Ueshiba for training, which already included then live-in students Kisshomaru Ueshiba, Koichi Tohei, and Tadashi Abe. This early training was quite brutal, but after persevering for several years, Saito became one of Ueshiba's closest students. Much credit is given to the fortuitous work schedule Saito had with the Japanese National Railways, where Saito worked 24 hours on, 24 hours off. As a result, Saito had the unique opportunity to train with Ueshiba in the practice of the sword and short staff, which occurred early each morning before the other students arrived.

=== Training ===
Training at the Iwama dojo consisted of a great deal of farmwork. The life of the full-time live in students consisted of prayer each morning before sunrise, two meals of rice porridge each day, and training interspersed with copious amounts of work on the farm. As a result of Saito's 24 hours on, 24 hours off, position with the National Railway meant that he would train and live as a live-in student only every other 24 hours. Eventually, the other live-in students moved away, and when Saito returned from work, he would train alone with Ueshiba.

Although other students such as Koichi Tohei trained with Ueshiba for more years than Saito did, Saito's work allowed him to train almost as an uchideshi, for long periods as the only student.

From 1946 until Ueshiba's passing in 1969, Saito served as Ueshiba's assistant in a variety of ways at Iwama while his wife served Mrs. Ueshiba. During Saito's period as a deshi he taught classes in the Iwama dojo.

=== Ueshiba's death ===
Before his death Ueshiba gave Morihiro Saito the responsibility of carrying on the teaching at the Iwama dojo and also the position of caretaker of the Aiki Jinja located in Iwama.

== Training methodology and philosophy ==
Saito's instruction of aikido is particularly remembered for its emphasis upon the basics of aikido, and especially upon the relationship between the armed and unarmed aspects of the art.

Kazuo Chiba, a live-in student (uchideshi) of Ueshiba at the Aikikai Hombu Dojo in Tokyo, recalled in particular the intensity of the training that occurred at the Iwama dojo,

A large portion of the membership at Iwama Dojo consisted of local farmers, hard workers who spent all day in the fields. They had thick bones and great physical strength, combined with a peculiar local character known as "Mito kishitsu," a type of manliness close to gallantry. Altogether, it was quite an opposite culture from Hombu Dojo in Tokyo. Because it is in the capital of Japan, Hombu's membership consists of white-collar workers, intellectuals, businessmen, politicians and university students. Any members who came to visit Iwama Dojo from Hombu must have looked pale and weak from city living to Iwama members. Indeed, the Iwama students treated us from Hombu as such and challenged us vigorously. It was a matter of survival for members from Hombu Dojo, including Hombu uchideshi like myself. And Saito Sensei was on top of that mountain, which we had to climb with all our might.

Chiba also emphasized Saito's focus upon katai-keiko (固い稽古), or vigorous practice without holding back, which Ueshiba taught and Saito demonstrated in his methods of teaching and practice. Apparently, this rigorous training with Saito, which Ueshiba would often observe, also included intense conditioning exercises, as well as general farmwork that students at the Iwama dojo were expected to assist with.

Other students of Saito attest to his commitment to carry on Ueshiba's legacy, and to follow and preserve Ueshiba's teachings as Saito had learned them. Saito believed that striking techniques (atemi) are a "vital element" of aikido, and also that the principles of swordsmanship formed the basis of aikido techniques. He also advocated training to cope with the attacks of other martial arts, such as the kicks practiced in karate.

According to Saito's son, Hitohiro Saito (now Hitohira), Saito believed that the basis of all empty-handed, sword, and staff techniques was the mastery of aikido's basic posture (hanmi). Saito believed that once the correct posture was mastered, the next step was to develop a proper kiai (sometimes translated as "spirit shout").

== Legacy ==
In the beginning of the 1970s, aikido students from outside Japan began traveling to Iwama to train under Saito. Later they would return to their native countries to teach what they had learned. There were also a small number of Japanese students of Saito who travelled abroad to teach Aikido, such as Takayasu-shihan.

The kind of aikido that Saito's students do is often referred to as Iwama aikido or Iwama style. In Europe, Saito, along with many of his students, formed a dan-ranking network of dojos called Iwama Ryu, with ranks received directly from Saito rather than or in addition to those from the Aikikai although Saito never left that organization. Saito also awarded teaching certifications for Aiki-weapons (bokken and jo) internationally. Receipt of the full set of five weapons certifications is considered the menkyo-kaiden.

Saito Sensei also inspired many around the world to establish dojo that focus on Iwama Style Aikido. Some dojo, like Aikido in Fredericksburg, have full-time uchideshi programs based on what Saito Sensei developed at the Iwama Dojo. Uchideshi can do short-term intensive studies (short stay) or long-term apprenticeships for a year or more to fully immerse in the training.

=== Saito family line ===
After Saito's death, his son Hitohiro formed the independent Shinshin Aikishuren Kai (神信合気修練会). Some of the Iwama Ryu network dojos joined Hitohiro while others including some of Saito's long-term students chose to remain affiliated with the Aikikai.

Hitohiro had already been the main instructor at Iwama dojo. Like the Aikikai Doshu, he does not claim a dan rank.

=== Senior (5th, 6th and 7th dan) Direct Students ===
This short list was chosen based on several criteria including: the rank of the instructor, how long they studied directly with Saito (total time in Iwama), how long they were a student of Saito (total time since becoming his student) and how senior they are in their given region. This list shows the ranks Morihiro Saito personally awarded in his life (under both the Iwama Ryu and Aikikai systems).

Note: Morihiro Saito never awarded any 8th dan rankings. The highest ranks he delivered were the two Iwama Ryu 7th dan Shihan ranks that he awarded to Paolo Corallini (Italy) and Ulf Evenås (Sweden).

For some instructors the current rank is also shown, since some of them continued teaching through other organizations (i.e. Aikikai Tokyo or Iwama Shin Shin Aiki Shuren Kai, founded by Hitohiro Saito, Morihiro's son).

For example, the only 6th dan in a given country might be listed while one of many 6th/7th dans in another country is not even if the latter instructor is senior to the former.

Country	Student	Rank awarded
United States	William Witt (current rank: Aikikai 8th dan Shihan) – First American uchideshi of Morihiro Saito	7th dan
Italy	Paolo Corallini (current rank: Aikikai 7th dan Shihan) – Morihiro Saito's Top ranked student	7th dan
Sweden	Ulf Evenås (current rank: Aikikai 8th dan Shihan) – Morihiro Saito's Top ranked student	7th dan
Germany	Ute and Mark van Meerendonk (current rank: Aikikai 7th dan)	6th Dan
United States	Hans Goto (current rank: Aikikai 7th dan)	6th dan
United States	Patricia Hendricks (current rank: Aikikai 7th dan)	6th dan
France	Patricia Guerri (current rank: 8th dan soke) – Uchi-deshi for three years in a row – 5th Mokuroku	6th dan
United States	Bernice Tom (current rank: Aikikai 7th dan)	6th Dan
United States	Kim Peuser (current rank: Aikikai 7th dan)	6th dan
Japan	Kenichi Shibata (current rank: Aikikai 7th dan Shihan)	6th dan
Australia	Saburo Takayasu (current rank: Aikikai 7th dan)	6th dan
France	Philippe Voarino (current rank: 7th dan Takemusu Aiki Intercontinental)	6th Dan
France	Daniel Toutain (current rank: Aikikai 6th dan)	6th dan
Italy	Giorgio Oscari (current rank: Aikikai 6th dan) – 5th Mokuroku Bukiwaza	5th Dan
Netherlands	Lewis Bernaldo de Quiros (current rank: Aikikai 7th dan Shihan)	5th Dan
Israel / U.S.A.	Miles Kessler (current rank: Aikikai 6th dan)	5th Dan
Sweden	Lars-Göran Andersson (current rank: Aikikai 7th dan Shihan)	5th dan
Philippines	Dennis Tatoian (current rank: 7th dan Iwama Shin Shin Aiki Shuren Kai)	5th dan
Portugal	Tristão da Cunha (current rank: 8th dan Iwama Shin Shin Aiki Shuren Kai, the "Last Uchideshi")	5th dan
United States	Stephanie Yap (current rank: 7th dan Iwama Shin Shin Aiki Shuren Kai)	5th dan
France	Jean-Marc Serio (current rank: Aikikai 6th dan)	5th Dan
United Kingdom	Tony Sargeant (current rank: 7th dan Shihan Aikido Alliance UK) – Morihiro Saito's UK Representative	5th Dan
United States	Mark Larson (current rank: Aikikai 7th dan Shihan) – Last American uchideshi of Morihiro Saito	5th Dan
Germany	Edmund Kern (highest rank: Kyoshi 8th dan IMAF)	5th dan
Germany	Wolfgang Baumgartner (current rank: Aikikai 7th dan)	5th dan

== Published works ==
=== Books ===
- Saito, Morihiro (1979). Takemusu Aiki, Volume 1: Katatedori. Aiki News.
- Saito, Morihiro (1981). Takemusu Aiki, Volume 2: Koshinage. Aiki News.
- Saito, Morihiro (September 1973). Traditional Aikido, Vol.1: Basic Techniques. Minato Research & Publishing Company. ISBN 0-87040-266-8.
- Saito, Morihiro (December 1973). Traditional Aikido, Vol.2: Advanced Techniques. Minato Research & Publishing Company. ISBN 0-87040-267-6.
- Saito, Morihiro (July 1974). Traditional Aikido, Vol.3: Applied Techniques. Minato Research & Publishing Company. ISBN 0-87040-287-0.
- Saito, Morihiro (October 1974). Traditional Aikido, Vol.4: Vital Techniques. Minato Research & Publishing Company. ISBN 0-87040-288-9.
- Saito, Morihiro (March 1976). Traditional Aikido, Vol.5: Training Works Wonders. Minato Research & Publishing Company. ISBN 0-87040-372-9.
- Saito, Morihiro (1975). Aikido: Its Heart and Appearance. Minato Research. ISBN 0-870403-45-1.
- Saito, Morihiro (1994). Takemusu Aikido, Volume 1: Background and Basics. Aiki News. ISBN 4-900586-16-1.
- Saito, Morihiro (1996). Takemusu Aikido, Volume 2: More Basics. Aiki News. ISBN 4-900586-20-X.
- Saito, Morihiro (1996). Takemusu Aikido, Volume 3: Basics Concluded. Aiki News. ISBN 4-900586-21-8.
- Saito, Morihiro (1997). Takemusu Aikido, Volume 4: Kokyunage. Aiki News. ISBN 4-900586-24-2.
- Saito, Morihiro (2001). Takemusu Aikido, Volume 5: Bukidori & Ninindori. Aiki News. ISBN 4-900586-61-7.
- Saito, Morihiro (1999). Takemusu Aikido Special Edition: Budo (Commentary on the 1938 Training Manual of Morihei Ueshiba). Aiki News. ISBN 4-900586-56-0.

=== Film ===
- Saito, Morihiro (2003). Aiki Ken (DVD). Aikido Journal.
- Saito, Morihiro (2003). Aiki Jo (DVD). Aikido Journal.
- Saito, Morihiro (2005). Morihiro Saito: The Lost Seminars, Part 1-6 (DVD). Aikido Journal.
- Saito, Morihiro (2005). Saito Sensei Paris 2000 pt. 1–4 (DVD). Aikishop.com.
- Saito, Morihiro. 1990 U.S.A. West Coast Tour (DVD). Firelight Films.

Preceded by Morihei Ueshiba	Dōjōcho of Iwama Dōjō; 1964–2002	Succeeded by Hiroshi Isoyama
