= Kiai =

Short yell uttered by martial artists

Korean name
- Hangul: 기합
- Hanja: 氣合
Transcriptions
- Revised Romanization: gihap
- McCune–Reischauer: kihap

Japanese name
- Kanji: 気合
- Hiragana: きあい
Transcriptions
- Revised Hepburn: kiai

In Japanese martial arts a kiai (Japanese: 気合; /ˈkiːaɪ/) is a short shout uttered when performing an assault.

Traditional Japanese dojo generally uses single syllables beginning with a vowel. The practice has become a part of Asian martial arts in popular culture, especially in martial arts films, in writing often rendered in variants such as Hi-yah!, Aiyah!, Eeee-yah! or Hyah!. A kiai is usually not the word "kiai" itself.

== Etymology ==
The term is a compound of ki (Japanese: 気), meaning "energy" or "mood" and a(u) (Japanese: 合, infinitive ai), an emphatic marker. The same concept is known as kihap in many Korean martial arts, such as taekwondo and Tang Soo Do, ki being the energy and hap meaning to join, to harmonize or to amplify, based on the Korean reading of the same characters; its Hangul spelling is 기합.

In the board game Go, the term describes fighting spirit.

== Use in martial arts ==
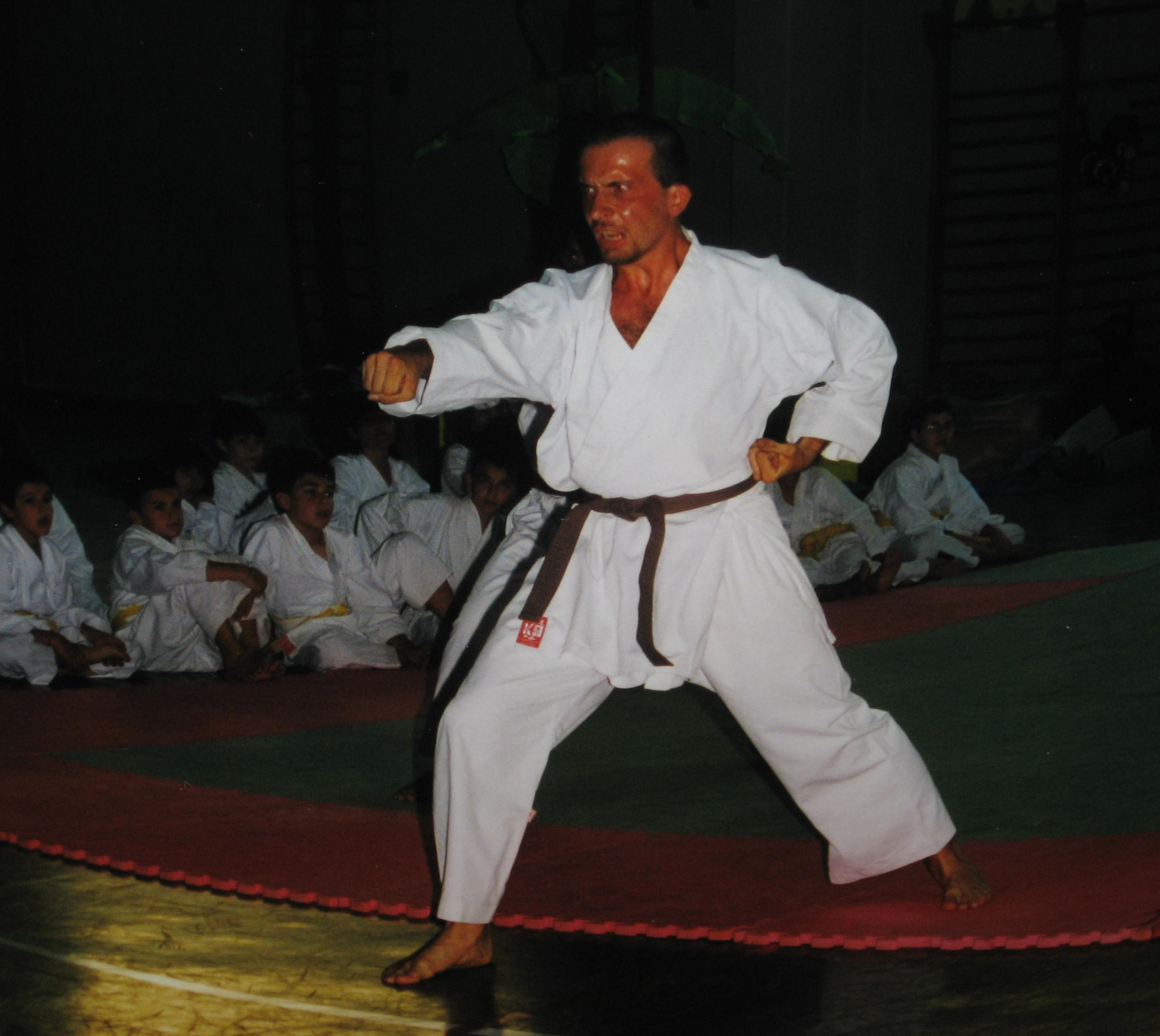
A man using kiai while performing a kata

Students of Japanese martial arts such as aikido, karate, kobudo, kendo, taido or judo (or related arts such as taiko drumming) use kiai to startle an opponent, intimidate, express confidence or express victory. In kendo, for example, a point is only given by the Shinpan (referees) if the hit is accompanied by a strong, convincing kiai. A kiai can also be used besides tightening the core muscles to prevent damage to the stomach. The physical aspects of a kiai are often used to teach a student proper breathing technique when executing an attack which is a common trait adopted by many other foreign martial arts and combat sports.

This is especially useful for longer series of attacks such as kirikaeshi, kakari geiko (rapid partner exercise creating openings) and uchikomi geiko (responding fast to openings made by the partner).

Mental imagery techniques are used to teach the martial artist to imagine starting a kiai in the hara or dantian; from a physiological perspective, this means the yell should start in the diaphragm, not the throat.

== Bibliography ==
- Don Oberloh "The Dojo Desk Reference- Translation of "Hyaku Jiten no Bugei" by Sakiyama Akatsuki. Densho Publications Honolulu, Hi. (2006) ISBN 0-9787198-0-8 This book is now available as an ebook through Lulu, iTunes and Barnes and Noble.
- E.J. Harrison, The Fighting Spirit of Japan Overlook TP; Reprint edition (1988) ISBN 0-87951-154-0
- Forrest E. Morgan, Living the Martial Way: A Manual for the Way a Modern Warrior Should Think, Barricade Books, 1992, ISBN 0-942637-76-3
