= Aiki Segi =

Japanese footballer (born 1991)

Personal information
- Date of birth: 22 January 1991 (age 35)
- Place of birth: Ishikawa Prefecture, Japan
- Height: 1.55 m (5 ft 1 in)
- Position: Midfielder

Team information
- Current team: Omiya Ardija Ventus
- Number: 16

Senior career*
Years	Team	Apps	(Gls)
- Omiya Ardija Ventus
- * Club domestic league appearances and goals

Aiki Segi (born 22 January 1991) is a Japanese professional footballer who plays as a midfielder for WE League club Omiya Ardija Ventus.

== Club career ==
Segi made her WE League debut on 12 September 2021.
