= Aiki (martial arts principle) =

Japanese concept

Aiki (合気, "joining spirit"), a Japanese budō term, at its most basic is a principle that allows a conditioned practitioner to negate or redirect an opponent's power. When applied, the aiki practitioner controls the actions of the attacker with minimal effort and with a distinct absence of muscular tension usually associated with physical effort.

== Etymology ==
In Japanese Aiki is formed from two kanji:

- 合 – ai – joining
- 気 – ki – spirit

The kanji for ai is made of three radicals, "join", "one" and "mouth". Hence, ai symbolizes things coming together, merging. Aiki should not be confused with wa which refers to harmony. The kanji for ki represents a pot filled with steaming rice and a lid on it. Hence, ki symbolizes energy (in the body).

Thus aiki's meaning is to fit, join, or combine energy. However, care must be taken about the absolute meanings of words when discussing concepts derived from other cultures and expressed in different languages. This is particularly true when the words we use today have been derived from symbols, in this case, Japanese kanji, which represent ideas rather than literal translations of the components. Historical use of a term can influence meanings and be passed down by those wishing to illustrate ideas with the best word or phrase available to them. In this way, there may be a divergence of the meaning between arts or schools within the same art. The characters ai and ki have translations to many different English words.

Historically, the principle of aiki would be primarily transmitted orally, as such teachings were often a closely guarded secret. In modern times, the description of the concept varies from the physical to vague and open-ended, or more concerned with spiritual aspects.

== Martial arts ==
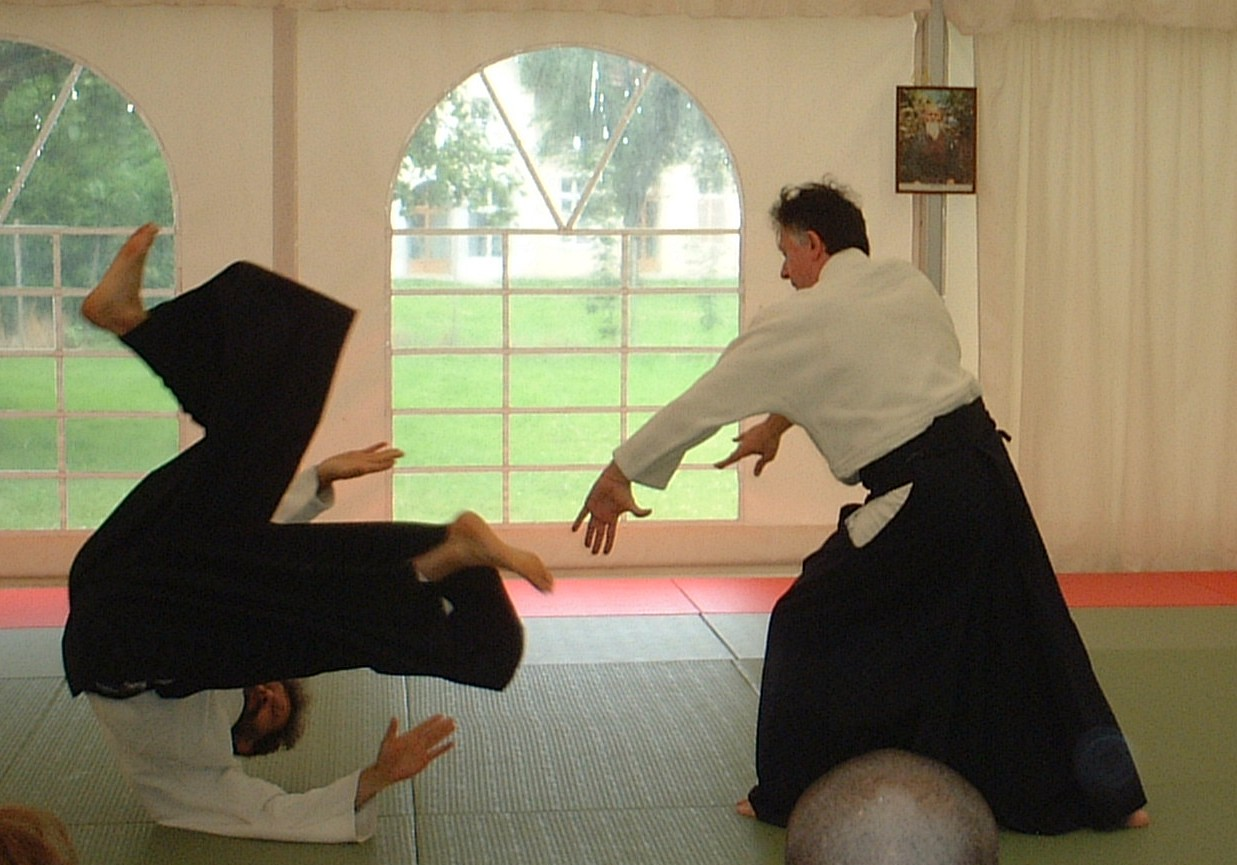
An aikido kokyu nage throw

Aiki lends its name to various Japanese martial arts, most notably Aikido, and its parent art, Daito-ryu aiki-jujutsu. These arts tend to use the principle of aiki as a core element underpinning the bulk of their techniques. Aiki is an important principle in several other arts such as Kito-ryu, Judo, Yamabujin Goshin jutsu and various forms of Kenjutsu and Japanese Jujutsu. Techniques accomplished with aiki are subtle and require little mechanical force with the aiki arts generally classed as soft internal martial arts.

== Concept ==
Aiki is a complex concept, and three aspects have been used to describe it in relation to a martial situation:

1) Blending, not clashing

Aiki typically describes an idea of oneness or blending in the midst of combat. In aikido it generally describes the more elevated notion of blending rather than clashing. "Blending" is often described even within aikido as awase (合わせ). Many definitions for aiki seem to be based around awase due to the complexity of the word usage in a particular Japanese context; the exact English interpretation would be hard to describe. Emphasis is upon joining with the rhythm and intent of the opponent in order to find the optimal position and timing with which to apply force. To blend with an attack, many believe it is necessary to yield to incoming forces but basic practitioners of aiki understand that there is a difference between 'blending' and 'giving way', and they instead train to 'take the line' of attack subtly and control it. Aiki is closely related to the principle of ju though the latter places more emphasis on the active physical manipulation on a mechanical structural level.

2) Leading the assailant

The aiki practitioner is able to lead the attack, and thus the attacker, into precarious positions. The influence over an assailant grows as the assailant's balance deteriorates. Body movements (tai sabaki) used for this may be large and obvious or small and subtle, internally generated movements. Subtle weight shifting and the application of physical pressure to the assailant enables one to lead them, keep them static, or keep them unbalanced (kuzushi) in order to employ one's own technique. In the same manner, through deceptive movements, the aiki practitioner may negate a defence response from the assailant or create a defence response from the assailant that puts them even further into peril. There is a strong degree of intent, will or psychology to this aspect of domination. Mind and body are coordinated.

3) Use of internal strength – Ki energy

Kiai and aiki use the same kanji (transposed) and can be thought of as the inner and the outer aspect of the same principle. Kiai relates to the manifestation, emission or projection of one's own energy externally (external strength), while aiki relates to one's own energy internally (internal strength). Thus kiai is the union of external energies while aiki is the union of internal energies. This use of ki will involve the use of kokyu power, i.e. breathing is coordinated with movement. Kokyu ryoku is the natural power that can be produced when body and consciousness (mind) are unified. The term kokyu (呼吸) can also be used to describe a situation in which two opponents are moving with appropriate timing.

== Thoughts on the concept ==
Aiki is considered to be an ancient practice, and its practice is often kept within a particular individual or two from a family/school lineage. Culturally, and due to certain necessities of the time period, the aiki knowledge was usually a very well-guarded secret and rarely disclosed.

The oldest book to have historically discussed aiki was the 1899 Budo Hiketsu-Aiki no Jutsu. On the subject of aiki it was written:

The most profound and mysterious art in the world is the art of aiki. This is the secret principle of all the martial arts in Japan. One who masters it can be an unparalleled martial genius.

The Textbook of Jujutsu (Jujutsu Kyoju-sho Ryu no Maki) from 1913 stated:

Aiki is an impassive state of mind without a blind side, slackness, evil intention, or fear. There is no difference between aiki and ki-ai; however, if compared, when expressed dynamically aiki is called kiai, and when expressed statically, it is aiki.

The term aiki has been used since ancient times and is not unique to Daito-ryu. The ki in aiki is go no sen, meaning to respond to an attack.

... Daito-ryu is all go no sen—you first evade your opponent's attack and then strike or control him. Likewise, Itto-ryu is primarily go no sen. You attack because an opponent attacks you. This implies not cutting your opponent. This is called katsujinken (life-giving sword). Its opposite is called setsuninken (death-dealing sword).
