= Budō =

Japanese martial arts

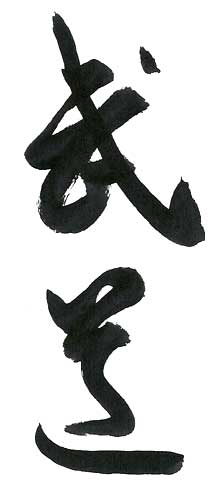

Japanese name
- Kanji: 武道
- Hiragana: ぶどう
Transcriptions
- Revised Hepburn: budō

Budō (武道) is a Japanese term describing modern Japanese martial arts. It is commonly translated as "Martial Way", or the "Way of Martial Arts".

== Etymology ==
Budō is a compound of the root bu (武 or ぶ; Chinese: wǔ), meaning to stop, cease or against and dō (道 or どう; dào), incorporating the character above for head and below for foot, meaning the unification of mind and body "path" and "way" the action and intention, the way to stop violence.. Budō is the idea of formulating propositions, subjecting them to philosophical critique and then following a "path" to realize them. Dō signifies a "way of life". Dō in the Japanese context is an experiential term in the sense that practice (the way of life) is the norm to verify the validity of the discipline cultivated through a given art form. Modern budō has no external enemy, only the internal one: the ego that must be understood.

Similarly to budō, bujutsu is a compound of the roots bu (武) and jutsu (術 or じゅつ), meaning technique. Thus, budō is translated in this context and comparison has been translated as "martial way", or "the way of war" while bujutsu is translated as "science of war" or "martial craft". However, both budō and bujutsu are used interchangeably in English with the broad term called "martial arts". Budo and bujutsu have quite a delicate difference: whereas bujutsu only gives attention to the physical part of fighting (how to best defeat an enemy), budo also gives attention to the mind and how one should cultivate and develop oneself.

The first significant occurrences of the word budō date back to the Kōyō Gunkan (16th century) when it was used to describe the samurai lifestyle rather than the practice of martial techniques. The word was later re-theorized and redefined to the definition we know today, first by Nishikubo Hiromichi and the Dai Nippon Butokukai when the name of their vocational school for martial arts was changed from bujutsu senmon gakkō to budō senmon gakkō; and later by Kanō Jigorō, judo's founder, when he chose to name his art judo instead of jujutsu.

== Typical budo styles ==
- Aikido
- Iaido
- Jodo
- Judo
- Jujutsu
- Karate
- Kendo
- Kūdō
- Kyūdō
- Naginata
- Shōrinji kempō
- Sōjutsu
- Sumo

== Bujutsu ==
In modern history usage, bujutsu translates as martial art, military science, or military strategy depending on context, and is typified by its practical application of technique to real-world or battlefield situations. Budō, meaning martial way, has a more philosophical emphasis, but in actual usage, budo is considered the general term for all martial arts in Japan.

=== Civilian vs. military ===
Many consider budō a more civilian form of martial arts, as an interpretation or evolution of the older bujutsu, which they categorize as a more militaristic style or strategy. According to this distinction, the modern civilian art de-emphasizes practicality and effectiveness in favor of personal development from a fitness or spiritual perspective. The difference is between the more "civilian" versus "military" aspects of combat and personal development. They see budō and bujutsu as representing a particular strategy or philosophy regarding combat systems, but still, the terms are rather loosely applied and often interchangeable.

=== Art vs. lifestyle ===
One view is that a bujutsu is the martial art one practices, whereas a budo is the lifestyle one lives and the path one walks by practicing a bujutsu. For example, one could say that judo and jujutsu practised as a martial art are one and the same, meaning that the practice of the art jujutsu leads to obtaining the lifestyle of judo. (Judo was originally known as Kanō jujutsu, after judo's founder Kanō Jigorō.) That would also be true for arts such as kenjutsu/kendo and iaijutsu/iaido.

=== Recreational sport ===
Budō was featured in the Summer Olympic Games demonstration programme in 1964.
