= Iwama, Ibaraki =

Dissolved municipality in Ibaraki prefecture, Japan

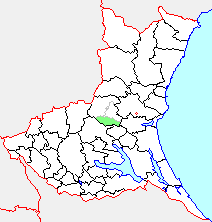
Map of Iwama, Ibaraki

Iwama (岩間町, Iwama-machi) was a small town located in Nishiibaraki District, Ibaraki Prefecture, Japan.

On March 19, 2006, Iwama, along with the town of Tomobe (also from Nishiibaraki District), was merged into the expanded city of Kasama.

== Geography ==
The former town of Iwama is located about 100 km northeast of Tokyo and near the city of Mito. Iwama is at the base of Mt. Atago (愛宕山 Atago-San). Mt. Atago is part of a larger Prefectural Park that extends up towards Kasama. On top of Mt. Atago is a kids' play area with a giant slide (about 150m in length) as well as the Atago shrine (愛宕神社 "Atago Jinja").

== Demographics ==
As of 2003, the town had an estimated population of 16,588 and a density of 332.23 persons per km^{2}. The total area was 49.93 km^{2}.

== Notable residents ==
Iwama is known for having been the residence of Morihei Ueshiba, founder of Aikido, from 1942 until his death. It was during this period that the term "Aikido" came into use. The world's only shrine to Aikido was built here by the founder along with a small dojo. Practitioners from around the world come to Iwama to train as uchideshi (内弟子) or “live-in students”. There are two famous Aikido dojos in the town including the original Iwama dojo (now called the Aikikai Foundation Ibaraki Branch Dojo) and the Shin-Shin Aiki-Juku. The latter is operated by Hitohiro Saito (the son of one of Ueshiba's most famous disciples Morihiro Saito) who formed his own organisation (the Aiki Shuren-Kai) in 2003. Ueshiba’s dojo continues to operate within the Aikikai under his original students, including Chief Instructor Hiroshi Isoyama, Shigemi Inagaki and others. The Aiki Jinja, or Aikido Shrine, is situated opposite the Iwama Dojo and near the Aiki Shuren-Kai Shin-Shin Aiki-juku.

== Festivals ==
The town's official matsuri is held in the last week of September, but throughout the year it also observes the usual Japanese holidays.

The Aiki Jinja Rei Taisai (Aiki-Shrine Grand Festival) is held every April on the 29th (Showa holiday) and features a "hono embu" (demonstration offering) by the Aikido Doshu. More than a thousand people usually come for the celebration which also features a Shinto ceremony carried out by Ōmoto-kyō priests.
