= William Gleason (aikidoka) =

- Born: 4 September 1943 (age 82); Minnesota
- Style: Aikido
- Teachers: Seigo Yamaguchi, Mitsugi Saotome
- Rank: 7th dan

Other information
- Spouse: Bev Pearson (div.)
- Children: Luke Gleason and Emiko Wederath
- Notable club: Aikido Schools of Ueshiba
- Website: www.shobu.org

William Gleason (born 4 September 1943) is the American author of two books about aikido, spirituality and kototama. He holds the rank of 7th dan in aikido and is the founder and head instructor of Shobu Aikido in Somerville, MA, USA. Gleason teaches seminars worldwide.

== Biography ==
Gleason lived in Tokyo, Japan from 1969–80, where he trained in traditional aikido and Japanese sword at the world headquarters of aikido, the Aikikai Hombu Dojo. Gleason wrote a brief account of his training at the dojo, describing the training environment and people involved.

Morihei Ueshiba ("O-sensei"), the founder of aikido, had died the year before Gleason arrived in Japan. Gleason wrote in his account about his intensive training with the founder's immediate students and uchi-deshi, including Takeda Yoshinobu, Kisaburo Osawa, Watanabe, Koichi Tohei, Mitsugi Saotome, Masando Sasaki, Seishiro Endo and second dōshu Kisshomaru Ueshiba. He describes training most often and intensely with the late Seigo Yamaguchi, who became his mentor and friend.

Gleason received his 1st degree black belt in 1972 from Kisshomaru Ueshiba. In 1998, Gleason received his 6th degree black belt from Mitsugi Saotome.

Gleason founded Shobu Aikido of Boston in 1980. Shobu Aikido of Boston is a nonprofit organization and a member of the Aikido Schools of Ueshiba (ASU), under the direction of Mitsugi Saotome. Several of Gleason's students have opened their own Shobu Aikido affiliated dojos around the USA.

In 2005, Gleason began the Shobu Okugyo Teacher Training Center, a unique forum designed to integrate the spiritual and physical aspects of Aikido. The seminars are 5-day retreats where students do meditation and aikido twice per day, macrobiotic cooking, and reading, discussion and practice of kototama.

== Publications ==
Gleason wrote two books, the first book was The Spiritual Foundations of Aikido. Based on research that began during his 10 years in Japan, Gleason wrote this book to introduce the underlying spiritual principles of Aikido. This is the first book in English to address the kototama (word souls) and teachings of Shinto and Aikido. Morihei Ueshiba had intended that his martial art would give form to profound spiritual truth and saw Aikido not as a fighting method or as a competitive sport but rather as a means of becoming one with the laws of universal ki, or life energy. Ueshiba's teachings were subtle and used esoteric Shinto terminology and are therefore difficult to interpret, especially by Western audiences. This book has been translated into four languages.

His second book was Aikido and Words of Power: The Sacred Sounds of the Kototama which discusses the sounds of kototama in the practice of aikido. The five vowels represent various dimensions and stages of awareness, whose different powers are revealed through aikido practice. Gleason presents physical routines that provide an introduction into the Kanagi, Sugaso, and Futonorito levels of spiritual development. Gleason notes that Aikido is often being approached as a purely physical discipline, but it is a truly profound spiritual vehicle for those who approach it with sincerity of purpose.

Gleason self-published a 2008 DVD entitled Aikido and Japanese Sword that demonstrates the sword movements that underlie many Aikido techniques and how this is an essential element to understanding martial practice.
