= Bjørn E. Olsen =

Norwegian fish exporter and martial artist

Bjørn Eirik Olsen
- Born: October 2, 1955 (age 71); Hammerfest, Finnmark, Norway

Bjørn Eirik Olsen (born 1955) is a Norwegian businessman, diplomat, and marketing strategist. He is also a kenjutsu practitioner and shihan of aikidō. He has been credited as "the inventor of salmon sushi" (サーモン寿司の発明者).

== Early life and education ==
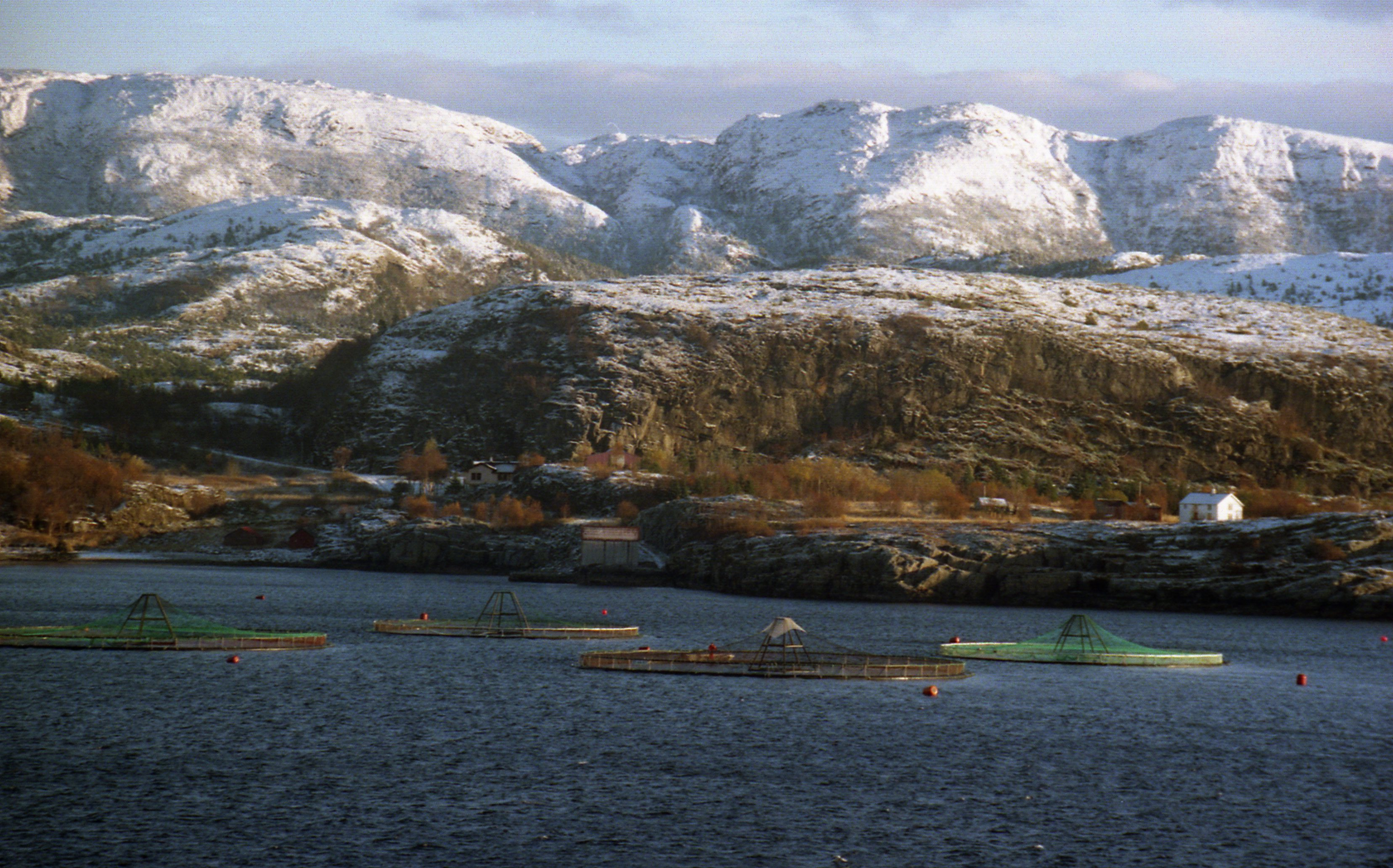
Salmon aquaculture in Norway

In 1966, 11-year-old Olsen saw the film Seven Samurai and thereafter developed a lifelong fascination with Japanese culture.

After working on fishing vessels from 1973 to 1977, he studied aquaculture at the University of Tromsø from 1977 to 1982. In 1979, he spent one year in London, where he studied aikidō and Zen Buddhism. In 1982, Olsen travelled to Japan on a Monbukagakushō Scholarship to study at Osaka University and conducted further research into aquaculture at Kyushu University 1982 to 1984. He subsequently studied international political economy at the University of Oslo in 1990 and strategic management at the Norwegian School of Economics in 1998.

== Career ==
From 1986 to 1989, Olsen worked on Project Japan as a market analyst and strategist for the Norwegian Trade Council. He was appointed Fisheries Attchaté at the Norwegian Embassy in Tokyo from 1991 to 1994, before becoming research director at Fiskeriforskning in Tromsø from 1995 to 1999 and managing director of ICFuture Consulting from 2000 to 2004. In 2005, he joined Nofima as a division director. From 2008 to 2013, he served as Chief Technical Advisor to a development project at Nha Trang University. From 2012 to 2018, he served as general director (daglig leder) of the SpareBank 1 Nord-Norge (SNN)'s Cultural Business Foundation. From 2019 to 2021 he was affiliated with the School of Business and Economics at The Arctic University of Norway. Since 2021, he has worked as a self-employed consultant, lecturer, and author. He has also chaired the boards of several cultural institutions, including Nordnorsk Jazzsenter and Arktisk Film Norge. Outside his professional career, he is an aikido shihan, 7th dan, and head instructor of the Norwegian Aikido Federation.

== Project Japan ==
In 1986, the Norwegian government launched Project Japan — a campaign to establish Norwegian seafood in the Japanese market in order to create an outlet for overproductive Norwegian fisheries. Olsen was hired as a market researcher for the project.

Olsen tried to impress upon the Japanese the potential of salmon for sushi, but prospective buyers were reluctant because the Pacific salmon typical in Japan could not be eaten raw due to infestation by Anisakis common in the Pacific Ocean. Furthermore, Pacific salmon meat is relatively low in oil and therefore less suitable for sushi or sashimi. In order to differentiate Norwegian Atlantic salmon from Pacific salmon in the minds of Japanese consumers, Olsen branded the imported fish as "Noruē sāmon" (ノルウェーサーモン), using transcripted English instead of the usual Japanese sake (鮭). Advertizing campaigns using the Noruē sāmon brand were launched in cooperation with celebrity chefs including Ishinabe Yutaka.

At the beginning of the 1990s, Olsen managed to convince Nichirei to buy 5000 tonnes of Norwegian Atlantic salmon on the condition that it only be sold for raw consumption. The popularity of conveyor belt sushi after the collapse of the bubble economy in 1991 resulted in good sales, and salmon sushi was widely available across Japan by 1995.

Annual polls conducted by Japanese seafood company Umios, found that salmon remained Japan's most popular conveyor belt sushi topping in 2026, ranking first for the 15th consecutive year. Although salmon ranked first among individual sushi toppings, tuna remains more popular overall when its various cuts are grouped together.

== Aikido, kenjutsu and zen ==
Olsen began practicing aikido in Tromsø in 1977. In 1979, he spent a year in London as a full-time student of Minoru Kanetsuka. In 1982, he trained for half a year in Osaka under Seiseki Abe and Bansen Tanaka, before moving to Fukuoka, where he trained intensively under Morito Suganuma for two years. In the 1980s, he also trained with Morihiro Saito in Scandinavia and in Iwama, and in 1988 he met Minoru Inaba, who became his kenjutsu teacher in addition to aikido. From 1991 to 1994, Olsen lived in Tokyo, where he practiced kenjutsu and aikido at Meiji Jingu Shiseikan under Minoru Inaba and at Aikikai Hombu Dojo under Kisshomaru Ueshiba. Olsen was appointed shihan by the Aikikai Hombu Dojo in 2012 and received his 7th dan in January 2016. Since 1998, he has been the chief instructor of the Norwegian Aikido Federation and has taught seminars abroad.

Olsen has also practiced zen regularly for decades. Since 2011, he has been a close student of Vigdis Garbarek.

In 1980, Olsen founded TSI Aikido in Tromsø; the club later became known as Reimeikan. In 1989, he founded Tenshinkan Aikido in Oslo and, after moving back to the city in August 2020, remains active as one of the club's head instructors.

== Selected bibliography ==
- Olsen, Bjørn Eirik (1985). Anvendelse (in Norwegian). Fiskeriteknologisk forskningsinstitutt. ISBN 8272511282.
- Olsen, Bjørn Eirik (1987). Det japanske markedet for marine produkter: en oversikt over forbruk, produksjon og handel med utlandet (in Norwegian). Norges eksportråd.
- Olsen, Bjørn Eirik (1988). Den japanske konsument: perspektiver, matkultur og forbruk av fisk (in Norwegian). Norges eksportråd.
- Olsen, Bjørn Eirik (1990). Norsk fisk i Japan: konkurrentanalyse og markedsstrategi (in Norwegian). Norges eksportråd.
- Olsen, Bjørn Eirik (2002). Kompetanseutfordringen i ny marin næring: det regionale samsvar (in Norwegian). ICFuture. ISBN 8299652200.
- Henriksen, Edgar; Olsen, Bjørn Eirik (2008). Kystens hus: konsept og organisering av oppstart (in Norwegian). Nofima marked.
- Olsen, Bjørn Eirik; Iversen, Audun (2009). Nord-Norge 2040: vi kan forme vår framtid (in Norwegian). Nofima marine. ISBN 9788272516863.
- Gran, Anne-Britt; Olsen, Bjørn Eirik, eds. (2021-06-28). Kreativ næring: Lokale, digitale og økonomiske perspektiver (in Norwegian). Universitetsforlaget. ISBN 9788215035659.

== See also ==
- Hidekazu Tojo, who developed a type of salmon sushi in 1974
