= Ueshiba =

Ueshiba (written: 植芝 lit. "planted lawn") is a Japanese surname. Notable people with the surname include:

- Morihei Ueshiba, the founder of aikido, often referred to as Ōsensei
- Kisshomaru Ueshiba, an aikido teacher, the 2nd Dōshu
- Moriteru Ueshiba, an aikido teacher, the 3rd Dōshu
- Mitsuteru Ueshiba, an aikido teacher, son of Moriteru Ueshiba and presumed heir
- Riichi Ueshiba, a Japanese manga artist
