= Christian Tissier =

French aikido teacher

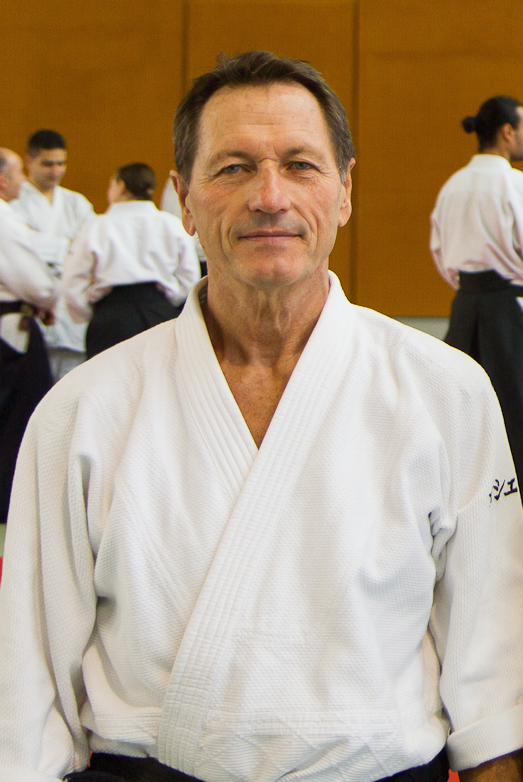
- Born: February 7, 1951 (age 75); Paris, France
- Nationality: French
- Style: Aikido
- Teachers: Seigo Yamaguchi; Kisaburo Osawa; Kisshomaru Ueshiba
- Rank: Shihan, 8th Dan Aikikai

Other information
- Website: www.christiantissier.com

Christian Tissier (born 1951 in Paris, France) is one of the best known European aikido teachers, who pioneered the art in France. He started his Aikido training in 1962 as a child in Jean-Claude Tavernier's Dojo in Paris, following the style of Hiroo Mochizuki. He soon went on to train under Mutsuro Nakazono and was awarded by him the 2nd dan before leaving for Tokyo in 1969. He came to the Aikikai Hombu Dojo as an 18-year-old, and trained there for seven years. Among the teachers that have inspired him are Seigo Yamaguchi, Kisaburo Osawa and the second doshu Kisshomaru Ueshiba. While living in Tokyo, he also trained in Kenjutsu under Minoru Inaba at the Shiseikan and in Kickboxing at the Mejiro Gym. He also worked as a model and taught French language at a school and Institut Franco-japonais de Tokyo.

He received 7th dan in 1998, and is among the handful of westerners who have been given the title Shihan by the Aikikai.

He is a founding member of the Fédération Française d'Aïkido Aïkibudo et Affinitaires (FFAAA or 2F3A) which was created in 1983. He is also a member of the technical college (Collège Technique) in charge of the Dan grades examination and of the awarding of teaching certifications: Brevet d'Etat and Brevet Fédéral. These examinations take place jointly with members of the other federation, the Fédération Française d'Aïkido et de Budo (FFAB), within the Union des Fédérations d'Aïkido (UFA).

Christian Tissier also serves the International Aikido Federation as an instructor during congresses and as a technical coordinator and demonstrator during major events such as the World Combat Games.

He was one of the three Shihan (with Tsuruzo Miyamoto and Jiro Kimura) to be awarded the 8th dan by Aikido's Doshu Moriteru Ueshiba at the Kagamibiraki Ceremony held on January 11, 2016 at the Aikikai Hombu Dojo.

== Works ==
Books:

- Aikido Fondamental. Sedirep, Boulogne 1988 (1979) ISBN 2-901551-10-6
- Aikido Fondamental - Tome 2: Culture et Traditions. Sedirep, Boulogne; 1995 (1981) ISBN 2-901551-00-9
- Aikido Fondamental - Tome 3: Aiki-jo: Techniques de Bâton. Sedirep, Boulogne; 1991 (1983) ISBN 2-901551-17-3
- Aikido - Initiation. Sedirep, Boulogne; 1995 (1983) ISBN 2-901551-14-9
- Aikido Fondamental - Tome 4: Techniques avancées. Sedirep, Boulogne; 1995 (1987) ISBN 2-901551-40-8
- Aikido - Progression technique du 6ème Kyu au 1er Dan. Sedirep, Boulogne; 1996 (1990) ISBN 2-901551-57-2

Videos:

- Aikiken- Bokken- Kenjutsu- mes choix pour l'étude du Ken
- Aikido - Progression technique du 6ème Kyu au 1er Dan.

DVDs:

- Principes et applications - Volume 1 : immobilisations
- Principes et applications - Volume 2 : projections
- Principes et applications - Coffret : immobilisations et projections
- Variations et applications

Mobile Apps

- Christian Tissier - Aikido App
