= Masamichi Noro =

Japanese aikido teacher (1935–2013)

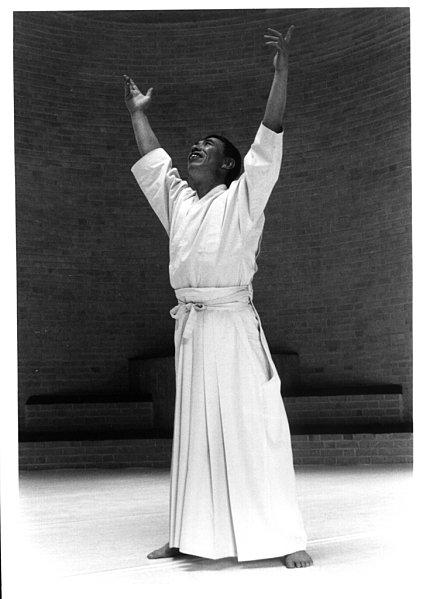
- Born: January 21, 1935; Aomori, Japan
- Died: March 15, 2013 (aged 78)
- Native name: 野呂 昌道 Noro Masamichi
- Style: Kinomichi and Aikido
- Teacher: Morihei Ueshiba
- Rank: Founder of Kinomichi and Aikido 6th dan (1961)

Other information
- Website: www.kinomichi.com

Masamichi Noro (野呂 昌道, Noro Masamichi; January 21, 1935 – March 15, 2013) was a Japanese aikido teacher and the founder of Kinomichi.

== Formative Years ==
Masamichi Noro was born January 21, 1935, in Aomori, Japan. His education destined him to be medical doctor, but one encounter re-directed the course of his life toward the martial arts, irrevocably. In 1955, while pursuing university studies, his uncle arranged for him to be presented to the founder of Aikido, Morihei Ueshiba. This event proved to be decisive and that same day he decided to renounce his plans in order to become uchi deshi, an internal student of this master. His training, in the ancient manner, took place night and day at the master's side. In this way, from 1955 to 1961, Masamichi Noro followed Morehei Ueshiba from Tokyo to Iwama where he had his private dojo. At this time, 5 uchi deshi (including Yasuo Kobayashi and Nobuyoshi Tamura) encircled the founder of Aikido, and from this breeding ground sprung the generation which would form a great part of Aïkido worldwide.

== The Propagation of Aikido ==
In 1961, Morihei Ueshiba wished to send an expert to Europe and entrusted his disciple Masamichi Noro, who by that time had received the 6th dan, the responsibility of supporting the enthusiasm and training of the European and African practitioners. So, he was urged by Morihei Ueshiba to embark toward the West with the title "Official Delegate for Europe and Africa". It has been noted that from this time, he renounced all dan above the 6th that had been given to him by his master. He followed the sea route of the time, passing the Suez Canal and the Pyramids to land at Marseille on September 3, 1961. The beginning was difficult. The art was new and the way of teaching it very different from the way it was taught in his master's dojo. Everything had to be structured, understood and made accessible to the western body and mind. Masamichi Noro deployed his initial energy in southeastern France and in Italy where Judo teachers had invited him to enrich the understanding of their students. The spirit was one of mutual assistance and pleasure in the study, following the wishes of Jigoro Kano, the founder of Judo. Then he was invited to Belgium. He opened his first dojo there. In ploughing these new lands for the budōs he opened more than 200 dojos, as many in Europe as in Africa, flying from Sweden to Senegal. This was a time of pioneers. Mutsuro Nakazono and Nobuyoshi Tamura joined him in 1963 and 1964, respectively. The task was immense, the success exemplary. In 1964, Masamichi Noro established his base in Paris and opened a succession of dojos which left their imprint within the heart of the French aikidokas : at the Gare du Nord, rue de Constance, rue des Petits Hôtels. In the Parisian melting pot, Masamichi Noro met Taisen Deshimaru, Karlfried Graf Dürckheim, Marie-Thérèse Foix, Gisèle de Noiret and Docteur Lily Ehrenfried. He opened himself to new ideas, to original perspectives, to occidental techniques.

== The Creation of Kinomichi ==
=== The Second Beginning ===
In 1979, after a discussion with Kisshomaru Ueshiba, the son of the founder of Aikido, Masamichi Noro created Kinomichi® in order to further extend his quest. There followed a new succession of Parisian dojos dedicated to the study of Kinomichi : rue Logelbach, boulevard de Strasbourg, boulevard des Batignolles. After an inevitable period of adjustments and intense research, the links between Kinomichi® and Aikido developed and deepened.

=== A Community of Budōs ===
1995, at the time of the 20th anniversary of Aikido in Germany and at the invitation of his friend Katsuaki Asai, 8th dan Aïkikaï and pioneer of Aikido in Germany, he presented Kinomichi® before a gathering of the greatest masters of Aikido, including the Doshu. From 1996, he made frequent visits to the Aikikai Foundation in Tokyo and, of course, to Kishomaru Ueshiba, the son of Aikido's founder. In 2001, he obtained recognition from the ministry of youth and sports (Ministère de la Jeunesse et des Sports) of Kinomichi® as an official sporting discipline. In 2004, he participated in the events celebrating the 20th anniversary of the Fédération française d'aïkido, aïkibudo et affinitaires, FFAAA, which welcomed the Moriteru Ueshiba, representative of the Centre Mondial de l’Aïkido in Tokyo. Masamichi Noro, Nobuyoshi Tamura and Christian Tissier were notably present to receive the delegation from the Hombu Dojo of Tokyo. They were among 3000 practitioners from all of France as well as numerous European countries. April 8, 2005, he was invited with Master Christian Tissier to participate in a workshop organized by the association Hakki for the benefit of the 220,000 victims of the tsunami of December 26, 2004. In 2007, at the initiative of the FFAAA, he welcomed into his Parisian dojo Japanese masters, including Isoyama. On March 15, 2013, Noro Masamichi died.

=== An ever evolving creation ===
Since its creation, Kinomichi® has known 3 phases and Masamichi Noro emphasized to tell his students that his art was ever evolving. The 1980s were characterized by focusing the work on sensitivity, on a correct and relaxed posture, and on the body as an instrument of perception of the self, others and the world. The 90s accented the orientation of the ki and organized the movement to initiate from the ground. 2000 opened onto a period where the technical richness was to be studied in different degrees of speed, difficulty and freedom. Each level is seen not as inferior to the one that follows but like a pathway to that which comes next, like a call to advance. Masamichi Noro accented the heart, shin 心, in particular. He created access to his art through the work on the breath, ki 気. He demanded, at the highest level, that the ki be oriented by the shin, the breath by the heart and that it should be closely bound to technical expertise. Masamichi Noro deployed his energy to create a discipline that opens onto his becoming, following the example of his own master. Morihei Ueshiba never ceased transforming his art, to the point of having given his art 7 different names, like so many milestones along the Way. In this manner, Masamichi Noro took to heart the etymology of dojo 道場, the place where one studies the Way, Do 道 in Japanese and Tao in Chinese.

=== Successor and descendants ===
Following the death of Noro Masamichi sensei, his son Noro Takeharu sensei continues the teaching of Kinomichi according to his father's wish. In Germany, the Aikido of Asai Katsuaki sensei, 8th dan Aikikai, maintains a strong influence of the art of Noro Masamichi sensei. Many Aikido experts like to quote Noro Masamichi sensei as their master or one of their masters:

- Michel Bécart senseï 7th dan
- Raymond Bisch senseï 6th dan
- Daniel Martin senseï 6th dan
- Bernard Palmier senseï 7th dan
- Daniel Toutain senseï 6th dan

Nguyen Thanh Thien sensei, a student of Noro Masamichi sensei, has created the Ringenkai Aikido as an offspring Noro Masamichi sensei's teaching.

The KIIA, an independent group, brings together former students of Noro Masamichi sensei (FFAAA technical committee : Christian Bleyer, Jean Pierre Cortier, Lucien Forni, Françoise Paumard, Martine Pillet, Hubert Thomas, Françoise Weidmann). DNBK, Dai Nippon Butoku General Kai Corporation, has certified Noro Masamichi sensei's followers as Shihan Aikido Hanshi :

- Jean Pierre Cortier Sensei, 8th dan
- Lucien Forni Sensei, 8th dan
- Hubert Thomas Sensei, 8th dan
