= Yoshinobu Takeda (Aikido) =

Japanese aikido instructor (born 1940)

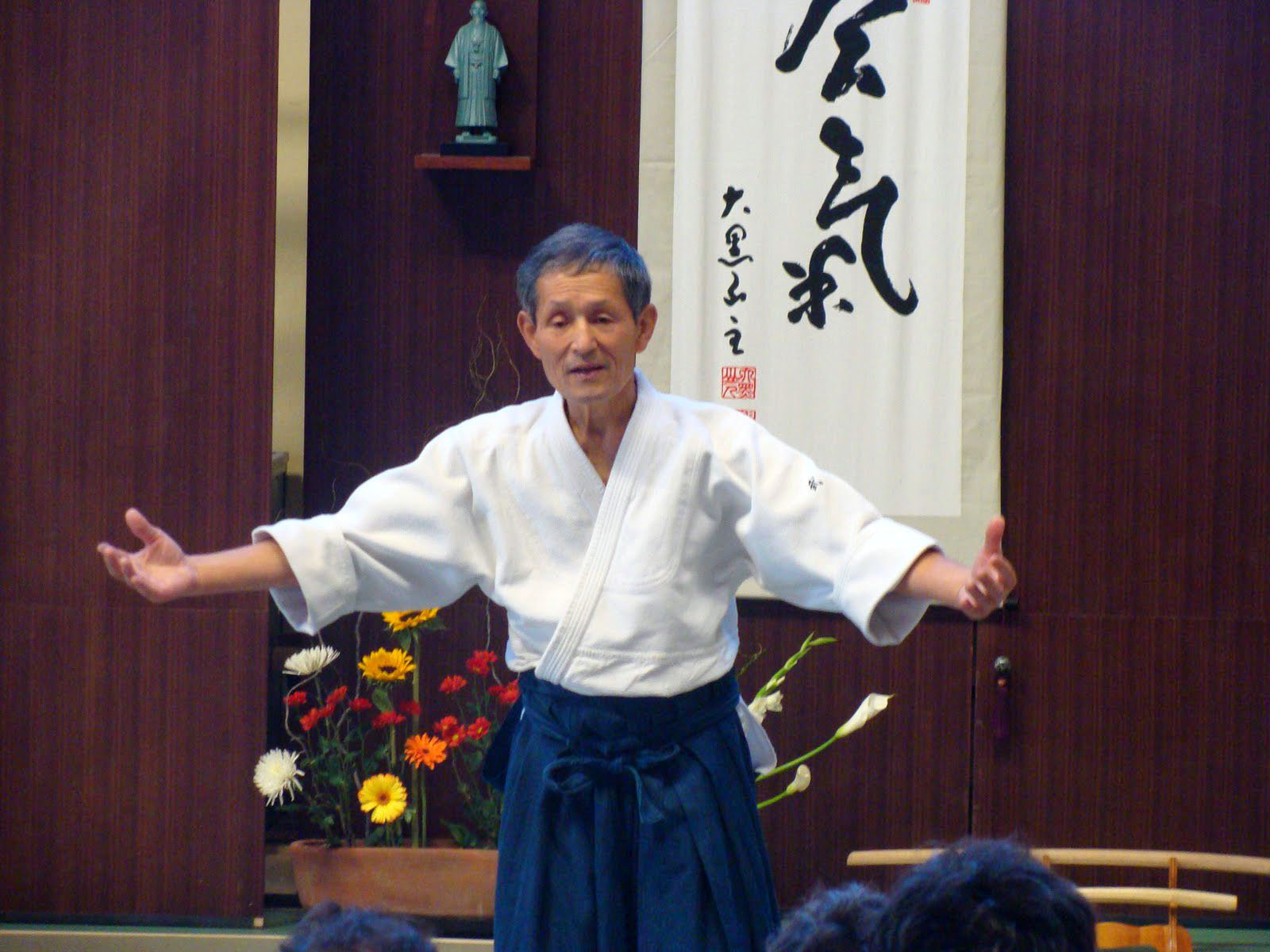
Takeda Shihan during a seminar in Chile, November 2011

Yoshinobu Takeda (武田義信, Takeda Yoshinobu) (born January 1, 1940) is a Japanese aikido instructor currently living in Japan. He is an 8th dan ranked Aikikai aikido master teacher. Takeda is among the few living people who studied directly under aikido founder Morihei Ueshiba.

Takeda began training at the Aikikai Hombu Dojo in 1960. During his time there, he trained with master teachers including Kisshomaru Ueshiba, Sadateru Arikawa, Hiroshi Tada and Nobuyoshi Tamura. His primary teacher was Seigo Yamaguchi.

== Aikido Kenkyukai International ==
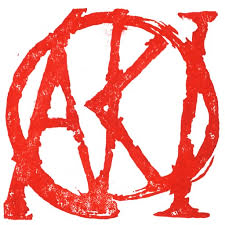
AKI logo

Kenkyukai International was started by Takeda as a way to further explore Aikido. The word "kenkyukai" translates to roughly mean "research group". There are currently AKI dojos in Japan, Australia, Indonesia, New Zealand, Canada, the United States, Chile, Peru, Uruguay, England, Germany, France, Croatia, and Tanzania.
