= Kazuo Chiba =

Japanese aikido teacher

T.K. Chiba
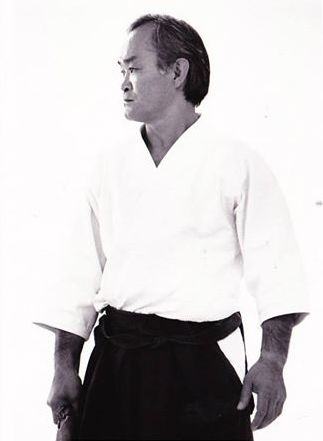
- T.K. Chiba
- Born: February 5, 1940; Tochigi Prefecture, Japan
- Died: June 5, 2015 (aged 75); San Diego, California
- Native name: 千葉 和雄 Chiba Kazuo
- Nationality: Japanese
- Style: Aikido, Judo, Karate
- Teachers: Morihei Ueshiba, Kisshomaru Ueshiba

Other information
- Notable students: Notable Aikikai Shihans: Chris Mooney

Kazuo Chiba (千葉和雄 also T.K. Chiba; February 5, 1940 – June 5, 2015) was a Japanese aikido teacher and founder of Birankai International. He served for seven years as uchideshi at the Aikikai Hombu Dojo before being dispatched abroad to help develop Aikido internationally. He held an 8th dan in Aikido, issued by Aikikai world headquarters in Tokyo, Japan and was active in Aikido for over 50 years.

== Biography ==
=== Early life ===
Kazuo Chiba was born February 5, 1940, near Tokyo, Japan. At 14 years of age, he began serious Judo training at the International Judo Academy, and also began the study of Shotokan karate at age 16. In 1958, after coming across a photo of Morihei Ueshiba in a book, he decided to dedicate himself solely to Aikido and set out to apply as an uchideshi at the main school in Tokyo. Though not accepting live-in students at the time, after much persistence Chiba was admitted as an uchideshi at the Hombu dojo in Tokyo. Most of the daily training at the Hombu dojo was conducted by Kisshomaru Ueshiba, the son of the Aikido founder; O'Sensei was frequently away from the dojo giving lectures on Aikido and Oomoto-Kyo during Chiba's stay as uchideshi. For much of his seven-year period as a live-in student, however, Chiba Sensei traveled extensively with Morihei Ueshiba as his personal assistant during travels spreading Aikido. By 1960, Chiba had received the rank of 3rd dan and was assigned to Nagoya to establish one of the first branch schools of the Aikikai headquarters, where he served as its full-time instructor. In 1962, he also began teaching at the Hombu Dojo, and within three years had completed his training as uchideshi and earned promotion to 5th Dan.

=== United Kingdom ===
During the 1964 Olympic Games held in Tokyo, a notable Judo master, Kenshiro Abbe came to Hombu Dojo to pay respects to O'Sensei. It was during this visit that he requested an instructor be dispatched to England to develop Aikido for the British Judo council. Chiba Sensei, who had been serving tea to the two masters had been supposed to go to New York to assist Yamada Sensei, but on the request O'Sensei sent him as the first representative of the Aikikai Foundation in the UK, though other teachers had gone in previously (including Abbe, although his principal focus had been on judo). In March 1966 he began his voyage from the Port of Sasebo and arrived in the UK at Heathrow Airport on the 5th May 1966.

In 1970 he was promoted to 6th Dan and awarded the title Shihan, Master Instructor. In 1975, Chiba returned to Japan to serve as Secretary of the International Department at the Aikikai Hombu Dojo. During the ten years Chiba spent in the UK, he also helped to promote Aikido across Europe particularly in Belgium, France, Greece, Ireland, Italy, the Netherlands, Morocco, Spain and Switzerland.

==== Northumberland ====
Chiba Sensei faced much racism in the post-war culture of Britain since the Japanese had been on the opposing side e.g., on arrival his luggage was turned out and he was taken to a separate room to be questioned about the purposes of his visit. He told the immigration officers that he was there to teach martial arts (which he subsequently thought was an unwise thing to do) and showed them the contract from the British Judo Council (BJC). As a result, a representative of Mr Logan, who had been with Kenshiro Abbe during the visit to Hombu Dojo and who was Chiba Sensei's sponsor, was brought in to represent the BJC and to account for Chiba Sensei's visit and after several hours he was released. After leaving the airport they went to King's Cross Station and boarded a train for Newcastle. Mr Logan intended to establish Chiba Sensei in Newcastle with mats which had been shipped on the same boat that bore him to England.

Chiba Sensei spoke limited English when he arrived in the UK. It was more than a month after arrival that Mr Logan informed him that he intended to bring home a Japanese interpreter, Mr Kimura, who spoke fluent English and worked for the company affiliated with Common Brothers Shipping - the company of which Mr Logan was an executive. This helped mediate what had become a long and lonely period in the UK, but it did not resolve many of the problems which were to occur later.

In early June 1966, one month after arrival, Chiba Sensei was told by Mr Logan that they had arranged for him to do a demonstration at the Northumberland Police Headquarters in Newcastle, the intention being that the police may hire him to teach a self-defense program. The event took place at a Judo dojo near the Police Headquarters, with a dozen policemen dressed in keikogi and two high-ranking officers sat in chairs observing. The two conditions of the police were that no striking or kicking, and no bloodshed were to take place due to the police's policy against inflicting injury. For the first half hour Chiba Sensei responded to requests for defense against various attacks. Towards the end of the demonstration Chiba Sensei was asked to respond to handgun threats, one position was in the surrender pose with his hands in the air and the gun behind his head. Chiba Sensei performed shihonage and the uke landed on his head which began to bleed covering the keikogi and he was carried out by his comrades after becoming unconscious. Chiba Sensei knew that the mission had therefore been unsuccessful and he never heard from the police force subsequently.

The situation for Chiba Sensei became steadily more difficult, and a couple of weeks after the demonstration he had a long conversation with Mr Logan with the aid of Mr Kimura. During this meeting it became clear to him that there was a dire political situation preventing him from teaching Aikido in the UK, and hence the unexpected break since arriving. There were two Judo organisations in the UK: the British Judo Council (BJC) and the British Judo Association (BJA). The former was founded by Kenshiro Abbe, but the latter was recognized by the British authorities and was a member of the International Judo Federation (IJF) which was a member of the Olympic Committee that only recognizes one organisation per field, per country. The situation mirrored the history in Japan since Abbe Sensei had come from the Butotukai in Kyoto, rival to the Kodokan in Tokyo. Nonetheless, the BJC had a stronger membership (20,000 - 30,000) than the BJA, the failure after ten years to get his students recognized had caused Abbe Sensei political isolation leading to sickness which motivated his move back to Japan in 1964. However, for Hombu Dojo (then under the direction of Kisshomaru Ueshiba) Abbe Sensei was the official representative of British Aikido and therefore on his request for a teacher from the |Aikido Foundation to head the Aikido portion of his organisation, the British Aikido Council (BAC), there had been no reason to question the situation.

==== London ====
On the 14 December 1967 Chiba Sensei left Newcastle Station on the 11:55 train bound for London to relocate. Three notable individuals had appeared to see him off: Mr Logan's secretary, Mr Myers of Sunderland, who had acted as his personal assistant during his stay, and his student Mr P Butler. The move represented a certain freedom for Chiba Sensei, since it was an escape from the tangled political situation of Aikido in Britain and the power struggle. As preparation Chiba Sensei had discarded his belongings, save his weapons, a few books, and a heavy sheepskin coat. When he arrived he met with Mr Iyengar and George Stavrou at King's Cross Station who had invited him from the North.

Soon after arrival Chiba Sensei started teaching at Busen Dojo in King's Cross, the old Judo dojo where Kenshiro Abbe had started. There were approximately twenty students practicing, most of which were associated with George Stavrou. When the mats Mr Iyengar had ordered arrived the dojo moved to a new location Seven Sisters Road in Finchley, London. The new space was a community hall rented for two nights a week until they were able to find a better and more suitable location in the Greater London Sports Club in Chiswick where they had semi-permanently laid down the tatami mats. In 1972 the dojo relocated once more into a large Church hall in Earl's Court with a better atmosphere for a dojo and remained there until Chiba Sensei left for Japan in 1976. It was during this period that Chiba Sensei began the first kenshusei program that incorporated Aikido, weapons, iaido, and Zazen.

Chiba Sensei also formed the Aikikai of Great Britain (AGB) which grew steadily and expanded into several major cities in the UK, namely Birmingham, Leicester, Sunderland, Durham, Manchester, Liverpool, Cardiff, and Glasgow. In the early 1970s Chiba Sensei had a serious commitment to development of Aikido in Europe through the European Aikido Cultural Association (ACEA), the representative organization recognized by Hombu Dojo in Europe. He managed to reestablish his relationship with Tada Sensei, who was teaching in Italy, and joined his annual International Summer Course held at Lake Grada in Northern Italy near Verona. All activities combined he was traveling somewhere in the UK or the European continent nearly every weekend of the year.

in 1975 Kisshomaru Ueshiba conducted a tour of the UK, Spain, France, Belgium, Luxembourg, Holland, Germany, Switzerland, and Monaco. It was while Nidai Doshu was in Madrid that the International Aikido Federation (IAF) was formed, and the first congress of the IAF was scheduled to be held in Tokyo in May 1976. During that interval with strong recommendation from the directing committee of the ACEA Chiba Sensei was nominated to be the first secretary of the International Affairs for Hombu Dojo.

=== Return to Japan ===
In addition to his duties within the Aikikai after returning to Japan, Chiba also began serious study of Musō Shinden-ryū iaido under Takeshi Mitsuzuka. There was a time he lived in the Ichikukai Dojo where he practiced Zen, Misogi, and received his Zen-Buddhist name Taiwa which stands first in T.K. Chiba.

=== United States ===
Chiba Sensei moved to San Diego, California in 1981 on an invitation from the United States Aikido Federation and formed the San Diego Aikikai. Under Chiba Sensei's direction, San Diego Aikikai served as the headquarters for the Western Region of the United States Aikido Federation (later Birankai North America), an organization directly affiliated and recognized by Aikido World Headquarters (Hombu Dojo)] in Tokyo, Japan. For the next twenty-seven years Chiba continued to work diligently to promote aikido worldwide by teaching numerous seminars and by creating a rigorous teacher training program for his own students. His most proficient students, who are still actively teaching, were trained in San Diego in the traditional system of "uchi deshi" (live-in student), such as Juba Nour, Yahe Solomon, Ismail Hasan (now Aikido of London) and Steve Magson. In 2008, after 50 years in Aikido, Chiba retired from active teaching.

== Aikido Style ==
Chiba Sensei was dedicated to his master, and felt passionately about the Aikido as Budo which he learnt from O'Sensei as uchideshi. After O'Sensei died it became the position of Hombu dojo to keep Aikido accessible to all practitioners, regardless of age or physical limitations which does not contradict the principles of Aikido. However, Chiba Sensei learnt it as a (practical) martial art and rejected vehemently the idea that Aikido should become something else hence he insisted on keeping a live martial element which resulted in stylistic differences from the Aikikai foundation who were moving toward a more generic system.

All the other elements Aikido as "an art of living," as a means to better health, as calisthenics or a physical aesthetic pursuit all of these stem from a common root, which is budo. That they do so is perfectly fine, but the point is that they're not the root themselves. O-Sensei always stressed that "Aikido is budo" and "Budo is Aikido's source of power." If we forget this then Aikido will mutate into something else a so-called "art of living" or something more akin to yoga. -- T. K. Chiba

As a result, the Aikido practiced by Chiba Sensei and his students has been known as a dynamic or martial version. Having deep respect for the Aikikai Foundation it was important for Chiba Sensei that he and his students always respect their authority in the aikikai world. Therefore, unlike other notable students of O'Sensei, Chiba Sensei did not create his own school of Aikido separate from the Aikikai, but rather a style within the community - an important distinction. Unlike Aikido practiced at Hombu Dojo, Chiba Sensei Incorporated weapons work (Bokken and Jo), Zazen, and Iaido into his style.

=== Weapons ===
Chiba Sensei learnt the aiki-jo and aiki-ken system of Iwama-Ryu Aikido during his time there with O'Sensei and Saito Sensei, and for many years taught these. However, he subsequently adapted the forms incorporating elements of his study of Iaido and classic Japanese swordsmanship.

=== Zazen ===
It is well documented that O'Sensei taught Aikido as an extension of his deep religious views which combined Shinto and Zen. During his time as uchideshi, Chiba Sensei was introduced to both of these elements in particular misogi and zazen, which were both practiced by O'Sensei. However, the system of spiritual discipline he followed was based on Chinkon-Kishin (method of pacifying the soul and regaining or recovering the spirit) derived from ancient Shinto and its extension - the study of Kototama doctrine (the miraculous power of language inherent within the Japanese alphabet). Other students were also strongly influenced by this in particular the emphasis on ki by Koichi Tohei, and the Ki-no-renma system of Hiroshi Tada (who both influenced Chiba Sensei) stem from this study, all three were also heavily influenced by the breathing-system of Nakamura Tempu and regularly taught elements of it.

During his time with the founder, Chiba Sensei learnt that three principles were important for the study of Budo: religious faith, farming, and martial discipline. He confessed himself to having 'no problem with following the practice of farming and martial discipline' and continued both throughout his life, but he 'could not avoid the increasingly strong internal resistance that, as time went on, built up within [him] toward the Founder's spiritual discipline.' In an article he later wrote that he 'suffered from an internal split and feared the loss of unity between the physical art and spiritual discipline which was supposed to be the underlying principle of the art.' It was for this reason that he took up serious zen practice and remained a devoted zen Buddhist in the Rinzai school for the rest of his life, he wrote that this was a positive turning point in his Aikido life.

Zen is a discipline bringing about a confrontation with one's own original face and man's fundamental living principle, so-called "Honrai-no-Memboku" through engaging in the most direct, simple and primordial physical act of sitting. Chiba Sense defined Aikido as a martial art in which one has to deal with one's subjectivity in relation to others, and concluded that zen can be viewed as a premise or precondition for the martial discipline. He would often call Aikido a "moving Zen". His intention was to carry out a close inquiry concerning the essence of martial discipline by injecting the element of Zen discipline into the Dojo training where the practitioners are forced to confront their own true faces by being driven into a situation where there is no escape.

During his return to Japan after the UK, Chiba Sensei underwent a serious inquiry of Iaido and Zazen (and farming) and received the Zen-Buddhist name Taiwa meaning 'demon-eyes'. When established in the United States, Chiba Sensei strongly encouraged his students to also practice zazen, and made it a regular part his own dojo's timetable. Once the network was established, Genjo Marinello of Chobo-Ji was appointed as the meditation instructor for Birankai International and conducted regular sesshin. Since zazen was only introduced after his stay in the UK, many British students did not adopt it, however devotedly following his master Chris Mooney would regularly invite Genjo for sesshin and after years of serious study became Buddhist in the same school as his master, receiving his own Buddhist name of Gyoshin meaning 'mind of eternity'. Many of the later generations of Chiba Sensei's students also made a serious study of zazen and misogi, also receiving zen-buddhist names e.g., among the full-time teachers are Jenny Flower (Greece) who revived the name 'Toko' and Robert Savoca (USA) who received the name 'Ryugan'.

=== Iai-Batto-Ho ===
Chiba Sensei got permission to adapt forms of Muso Shiden Ryu Iaido which he studied whilst in Japan and taught these forms to his Aikido students as the Iai-Batto-Ho system.

=== Birankai International ===
In an effort to unite all of his students around the world, Chiba Sensei founded Birankai International in January 2000. This multinational organization was founded to strengthen the connections between Chiba Sensei's students worldwide and is recognized by Aikido world headquarters in Tokyo, Japan. It includes organizations in the United Kingdom, France, Austria, Greece, Poland, Canada, United States, Chile and many other places worldwide. Notable disciples who have pursued Aikido on a professional full-time basis include Robert Savoca of Brooklyn Aikikai, George Lyons of Bucks County Aikikai, Jenny Flowers of Athens Aikikai, and Piotr Masztalerz of Wroclaw Aikikai.

==== Shihankai ====
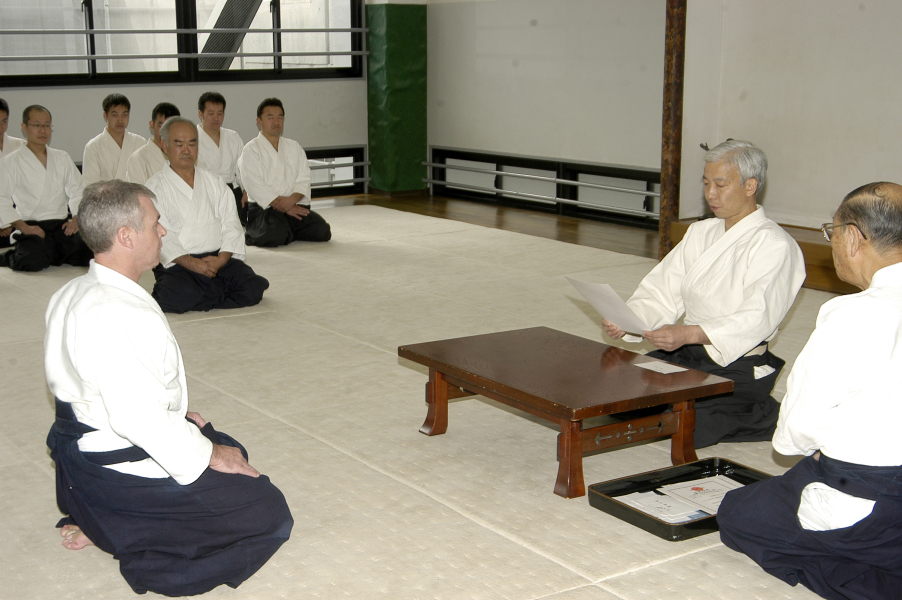
Chris Mooney Shihan Certification - Hombu 2006.

The Birankai organisations of various countries have been given Hombu Official Recognition in accordance with the rules set forth in the International Regulations of Aikido World Headquarters. In order to keep the traditions of the school and preserve the art, Chiba Sensei created a shihankai of his senior students, all certified by Hombu Dojo, who give technical guidance of the various national organisations. In Europe the official meeting was on 18 January 2006, comprising Noberto Chiesa, Mike Flynn, Chris Mooney, and Gabriel Valibouze, where it was agreed that the role of the shihankai would be to:

- act as custodians for the integrity of Chiba Sensei's work for the future in Europe (UK & Continental Europe),
- be closely involved with maintaining and developing the high quality of future and existing teachers in Europe,
- look to the future and plan for the time after Chiba sensei's retirement in Europe,
- take a strategic view of Aikido within Birankai and across the world with Aikikai Hombu Dojo in Japan and other Aikido associations.

In particular since Chiba Sensei was in the US, after the dissolution of Birankai Continental Europe (BCE) and the creation of the national Birankai organisations each country had an internal shihankai composed of the Shihans who lived there, and others were appointed Shihans to oversee the technical development within the organisation. As a result, in Europe the following teachers oversee the technical development within the associated countries:

- Patrick Barthélémy - France
- Daniel Brunner - Switzerland, Poland
- Dee Chen - Britain
- Noberto Chiesa - France
- Mike Flynn - Britain, Greece, Portugal
- Chris Mooney - Britain, Switzerland, Germany, Israel, Kazakhstan, Turkmenistan
- Gabriel Valibouze - France
