= Homma =

Honma or Homma (Japanese: 本間) is a Japanese surname. The choice of spelling for particular historical and modern persons is arbitrary.

Notable people with the surname include:

== Homma spelling ==
- Chieko Homma (born 1964), former Japanese football player
- Gaku Homma (本間 学 Honma Gaku) (born 1950), aikido teacher, student of Morihei Ueshiba
- Hans Homma (1874–1943), Austrian stage and film actor
- Isao Homma (born 1981), Japanese footballer
- Kazuo Homma or Kazuo Honma (born 1980), Japanese footballer
- Kei Homma (本間 圭; born 1985), Japanese football manager and coach
- Koji Homma (born 1977), Japanese footballer
- Masaharu Homma (1887–1946), Japanese general
- Munehisa Homma or Homma Munehisa (fl. 1700s), Japanese merchant, inventor of the candlestick chart
- Ryuta Homma (本間 隆太; born 1991), Japanese volleyball player
- Shigeo Homma (1904–1974), Japanese gymnast
- Tomekichi Homma (1865–1945), Japanese-Canadian pioneer, and labour and human rights activist

== Honma spelling ==
- Noriko Honma (born 1911), Japanese actress whose film work occurred primarily during the 1950s
- Risa Honma (born 1990), Japanese singer and actor born in Tokyo
- Sadaki Honma (本間 貞樹; born 1953), Japanese ice hockey player
- Satoshi Honma (born 1968), Japanese mixed martial artist
- Shinichi Honma (本間 信一; born 1934), Japanese ice hockey player
- Shion Honma (born 2000), Japanese football player
- Teiji Honma (born 1911), ice hockey goaltender who represented Japan at the 1936 Winter Olympics
- Teruyasu Honma (本間 照康; born 1949), Japanese ice hockey player
- Tomoaki Honma, freelance Japanese professional wrestler
- Toshiei Honma (本間 敏栄; born 1935), Japanese ice hockey player
- Yasuji Honma (本間 康二; born 1943), Japanese rower
- Honma, a Japanese golf equipment manufacturer, relocated its American headquarters to Carlsbad, California, a hub for golf-related companies.

== See also ==
- Honma clan (本間氏) is a Japanese clan that ruled the province of Sado between the 12th and 16th century
- Homma Museum of Art (本間美術館, Homma bijutsukan) opened in Sakata, Yamagata Prefecture, Japan, in 1947
- Homma Elementary School, Richmond, British Columbia, Canada
