= Korindo =

Korindo may refer to:

- Korindo Aikido
- Korindo Group, see Forest Stewardship Council § Criticism

== See also ==
- Korino
- Korando
