= Kinomichi =

Martial art

Kinomichi (氣之道)
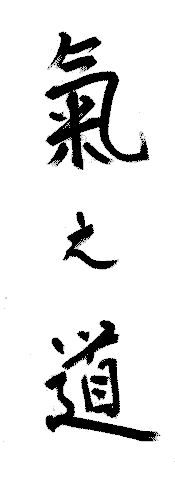
- "Kinomichi", calligraphy by Masamichi Noro.
- Focus: Grappling
- Hardness: Non-competitive
- Country of origin: Japan, France
- Creator: Masamichi Noro (野呂 昌道 Noro Masamichi, born 1935)
- Parenthood: Aikido
- Olympic sport: No
- Official website: http://www.kinomichi.com

Kinomichi (氣之道) is a martial art in the tradition of budō, developed from the Japanese art aikido by Masamichi Noro and founded in Paris, France, in 1979. Masamichi Noro was one of the live-in students (uchideshi) of Morihei Ueshiba, the founder of aikido. Designated "Delegate for Europe and Africa" by Morihei Ueshiba, Noro debarked in Marseille on September 3, 1961, preceding Nakazono and Tamura in the communal construction of a European and African aikido. In France, Kinomichi is affiliated with the Fédération Française d’Aïkido, Aïkibudo, Kinomichi et disciplines Associées (FFAAA) and maintains warm relations with the Aikikai Foundation and its leader, Moriteru Ueshiba, the grandson of aikido’s founder.

== Origins ==
In the same way that Morihei Ueshiba created aikido from the Daito-ryu aiki-jujutsu of Sokaku Takeda, Masamichi Noro extended his research to the creation of Kinomichi, founded on the technique, principles and philosophy of aikido. This natural process in the world of the Japanese budōs does not constitute a denial or an objection to what came before but, rather, the natural expression and evolution of a living art - the opening of a new path and new possibility.

For Masamichi Noro, the most essential elements of training are peace and its realization. Beginning from and adhering to these two elements places Man, like a link, between Earth and Sky. This union, holding in harmony the Way of the Sky, the Way of the Earth and the Way of Man, releases an ascending energy (ki in Japanese, qi in Chinese), from the ground upward, from the feet, through the grasp and beyond. The generation of energy takes its source from the ground and the intent, flows through the energy centers in the body, including the hara located in the abdomen, and is modulated by the heart of the practitioner.

== Characteristics ==
=== Energy and Heart ===
Masamichi Noro's teaching focuses on ki and the heart (shin in Japanese). From a physiological perspective, the body produces movement by activating the muscles, whose efforts are sustained by the work of the cardiovascular and respiratory systems. This understanding of the generation of energy stems from the European Age of Enlightenment and does not take into account the possibility of the Far Eastern conception based on ki. The Japanese budō teachers developed methods for mobilizing ki and pedagogic methods to teach it, and Noro's teaching is an adaptation of this to the western body and mind. The technique consists of conducting ki: borrowing, directing and restoring the ki. Thus, it is not so much a question of energy being produced out of a center, but of its flowing from the Earth toward the Sky, from the support of the earth toward the partner, along an arm, a stick or a sword. If the orientation is vertical, the direction given has to be ascending. To this end, Masamichi Noro turns to the heart (shin 心). According to his perspective, the shin not only makes it possible to feel the other but, moreover, to surpass the antagonism of oneself and others. "If it is advantageous for me to rise, I must admit that it is then the same for the other, and that the effect of the technique does not belong uniquely to me but to both of us." The shin is the condition for an empathy, a movement toward the other. In this sense, we are able to understand the words of Morihei Ueshiba: "My Aikido is love"「合氣は愛なり」. If the ki sustains the gesture, the shin modulates its palpitation. It harmonizes two cadences, which allows the partners to veer toward aïki, the harmonization of breaths. For Masamichi Noro, the couple ki - shin is of such fundamental importance that he requires it at the highest level.

=== Ki ===
The Western concept of the world rests on a distinction between the physical domain, which is tangible, and its complement, the metaphysical plane, beyond the physical, a separation that corresponds to the books of Aristotle (384 / 322 B.C.). The Chinese concept, and by extension the Japanese, perceives the ki (or in Chinese qi) as "a breath, influx or vital energy which animates the entire universe [... ] Simultaneously spirit and matter, the breath ensures the organic coherence of the living order at all levels".

Ki circulates, and humans are vessels, channels and conductors of ki. Kinomichi creates a particular circulation that according to kinomichi theory makes it possible for each individual to rise, from the earth toward the sky, from chi towards ten through man. Masamichi Noro reclaims as his own the vision of his master, Morihei Ueshiba, who used his techniques to perfect the proper circulation of the ki within himself and toward his partner, or uke in Japanese.

=== Shin ===
The shin, or heart/mind, cannot be separated from the ki. Referring again to the work of Anne Cheng, "Man is not only animated [by qi] in every aspect, he draws from it his criteria of value, whether of a moral or artistic nature. The source of moral energy, the qi, far from representing an abstract concept, is felt most profoundly in the being and in his flesh." The shin as heart is simultaneously an organ and a space of perception. As an organ, the shin invites us to feel the other, to experience his ki, to contact the partner through his energy. The shin is also a space through the continuity of experience one feels when confronted with the emotion, effort and understanding in the other, in their body, and in the breath revealing ki. The shin is a sign of our energy’s health: a perverted shin indicates a weak ki; a generous shin is testimony of strong ki. Kinomichi’s shin responds to the Confucian invitation to live the joy of the practice, the pleasure of the encounter and the happiness of sharing "with the friend who comes from afar. " It continues the research of Morihei Ueshiba to make of his art a bridge between men. Masamichi Noro has poured into the heart of his technique the heart of his Master.

== Organization and training ==
=== Techniques and initiations ===
The techniques are practiced barehanded, with a stick (Jō 杖), wooden sword (Bokken 木剣) and sword (Iaito 居合刀), upright or kneeling, with control or with throws, with one partner or many, in a systematic manner or freely. The technical wealth of this art and its profuse variations might make it seem complex. However, a thorough study with the support provided by the presence of a master allows one to understand its principles and, thus, glimpse its underlying simplicity. In this way, each variation opens a door toward its sister variations. Reiterating the didactic approach of his master, Morihei Ueshiba, Masamichi Noro retained 10 techniques as a base. The apprenticeship is done in levels or “Initiations” of study.

- Initiation 1: 6 basic movements
- Initiation 2: 19 movements with the 6 basic movements
- Initiation 3: 33 movements with 2 forms of approach
- Initiation 4: 111 movements with 8 forms of approach
- Initiation 5: all movements with 16 forms of approach, with one or several partners
- Initiation 6: advanced forms of approach, reserved for some advanced students, study of new tools such as tanto, tessen, etc.
- Initiation 7

At Initiation 5, the curriculum introduces advanced forms of approach and work with multiple partners. While the base of the primary Initiations is centered on the study of ki, levels 5 and 6 orient the practitioner toward an application of shin and a technical expertise. The aim of the work on ki is shin, and the study of shin is the next level. In the Far East, the organ dedicated to the mind is the heart. The manifestation of shin distinguishes a high level practice. This manner of discovering the art of Kinomichi is maybe what most characterises the art of Masamichi Noro sensei. The path set by a master is the signature of his art despite the mountain being common to all martial arts.

=== Non-competition ===
As in the ancient, traditional Japanese schools, or koryū, there is no degree or dan rank in Kinomichi. Titles distinguish the level of study and not the student. There is no competition.

== Principles ==
=== A Practice that Unites ===
Obedient to a desire to harmonize forces (Aiki in Japanese 合気) the technique is oriented toward the preservation of the other and oneself, an extension of the movement and not its obstruction, a stretching of the limbs and not an articular constraint. It is practiced by children, teenagers and adults, including seniors. Its treasures are explored by men and women, each according to their own sensibilities. Differences, often a source of conflict, are at the heart of the listening, regard and touch. They are an opportunity for surpassing oneself, for an encounter, and for reunion. Allying comfort and effort, pleasure in the body’s opening and physical work, leisurely activity and high level practice, Kinomichi surpasses what some call paradox. It fuses in the hearth of the practice the antagonisms that cause such opposition and conflict. The Oriental arts are understood by putting one’s footsteps in those of the Masters.

=== Action with a No Profit Mind ===
In response to a question posed by Arnaud Desjardins on his art, Masamichi Noro answered: "If I were able to explain my art, I would no longer need to study it." Kinomichi is a traditional art in the way that it was created, its transmission and evolution. That which is said today annuls that which belonged to the past, and what is written now is erased in the face of the art that pierces through the moment to come. As a budō arising from far eastern thought, Kinomichi is ”no profit", mushotoku according to the terminology of Zen . Benefits from such activity (such as physical health, mental stimulation or developing the capacity to respond and act) may form the Means to the Way, but must not be mistaken for the Way.

=== A Budō ===
Kinomichi is a Japanese budō. The spirit of practice in the dojo can be expressed with these words : "Not without the body, not solely through the body."

Indeed, Kinomichi is a practice whose framework par excellence is the dojo. It cannot be cut off from the recognition of Masamichi Noro without wilting. Kinomichi is a link between the latter, his teaching and the community of his students. It rests on a double link, toward the budōs as a whole, on one side, and toward its creator on the other. Loyalty to its roots imposes a deepening of meaning of the practice, thus advancing in alliance with technique toward the principles in order to illustrate the Way. The roots of Kinomichi lie in the hope of the Masters of old that their achievements be pushed forward by generations to come.

== Sources ==
- 2008 « Masamachi Noro: man of peace » An interview of Masamichi NORO sensei. Translation by Ann Moradian and Guillaume Badou.
- 2006 « Within the Spiral of Kinomichi » article by Nguyen Thanh Thiên in Dragon n°16 Juillet/Août.
- 2005 (in French) « Une rencontre de l’Aïkido et du Kinomichi » with Masamichi Noro and Christian Tissier, DVD, Gabriel TURKIEH, Production Altomedia,
- 2003 (in French) « Le mouvement universel du ki » interview of Masamichi Noro sensei in Aikido Magazine December 2003
- 1996 (in French) « Le Kinomichi, du mouvement à la création. Rencontre avec Masamichi Noro . » Raymond Murcia, Editeur Dervy-Livres, Collection Chemins De L'harmonie, ISBN 2-85076-806-5
- 1992 (in French) « La pratique du Kinomichi avec maître Noro » Daniel Roumanoff Editeur Criterion Collection L'homme relié, ISBN 2-7413-0040-2
