= Seigo Yamaguchi =

Japanese aikido instructor (1924–1996)

Seigo Yamaguchi (山口 清吾, Yamaguchi Seigo; 13 April 1924 – 24 January 1996) was a Japanese 9th-dan aikido instructor and important teacher in the Aikikai. According to Mitsugi Saotome, before he was sent to Burma in 1958, he was the most prolific teacher at Aikikai Hombu Dojo.

His personal students included Seishiro Endo, Yoshinobu Takeda, Masatoshi Yasuno and Christian Tissier.

Yamaguchi was born April 13, 1924, in Fukuoka, Japan. After his early education, he entered the navy, where he was eventually to carry out a Kamikaze suicide mission, but was saved by the end of World War II. He was introduced to Morihei Ueshiba in 1950, and entered the Aikikai in 1951. In 1958 he was sent to Burma to teach aikido to the army. Beginning in 1961 he again taught at the Aikikai Hombu Dojo; he also taught at his own dojo and at Meiji University.

He taught extensively overseas, especially in France, where he had a strong following and taught every year until 1995.
