= Teruyasu =

- Gender: Male

Origin
- Origin: Japanese
- Meaning: Different meanings depending on the kanji used

Teruyasu (written: 照恭 or 照康) is a masculine Japanese given name. Notable people with the name include:

- Teruyasu Honma (本間 照康; born 1949), Japanese ice hockey player
- Teruyasu Yonekura (米倉 照恭; born 1971), Japanese pole vaulter
