= Ryoichi Kinoshita =

Seiseki Abe & Ryoichi Kinoshita in Amenotakemusu Juku Dojo

Ryoichi Kinoshita (木下良一, Kinoshita Ryoichi, born January 28, 1959, in Osaka, Japan) is a Japanese Aikido instructor and Chiropractor who served on the instructional staff at Amenotakemusu Juku Aikido Dojo under Seiseki Abe for three decades. He has the rank of 7th dan in the Aikikai and is the chief instructor at the Suisenkan dojo.

== Biography ==
Before beginning his study of Aikido, Kinoshita trained in Kendo for eleven years, beginning at age six. He first began Aikido training under Abe Seiseki Shihan, attaining Shodan at age 16. At age 24, he became Uchi Deshi under Abe Shihan, and also joined the instructional staff at Amenotakemusu Juku Aikido Dojo. In 1991 he received 6th dan from the Aikikai Foundation. From 1996 to present day, he has been director and head instructor of Suisenkan Aikido dojo in Suita, Japan.

Kinoshita is a master calligrapher (shihan), whose work has been published in Nihon Shogeiin, Geijutsu Shinbunsha, and Nihon Bijutsu Tenrankai (Niten).

He has been named Honorary Professor and Honorary Doctor by IOND University (イオンド大学)

As of January 2016, he is married with three children.

Ryoichi Kinoshita
