= Chris Mooney (aikido) =

British martial artist

Christopher Mooney
- Born: October 17, 1958; Birmingham, United Kingdom
- Nationality: British, Irish
- Style: Aikido
- Teacher: Kazuo Chiba

Chris Mooney is a martial artist in the Japanese martial art of aikido, and dojo-cho of Ei Mei Kan Aikido Dojo in Birmingham, UK. He was a student of Kazuo Chiba who was the Technical Director of the British Birankai, a direct student of the founder of aikido, Morihei Ueshiba. He holds 7th Dan in Aikido, accredited to him by the founder's grandson third and current Doshu (hereditary head) of the Aikikai, Moriteru Ueshiba, the 2008 Kagamibiraki. He has also been awarded the title of Shihan by Hombu Dojo in 2006, also conferred on him by the third Doshu.

Apart from maintaining his own dojo, Chris Mooney teaches in many countries around the world including France, Germany, Greece, Israel, Kazakhstan, Switzerland, Turkmenistan, and around the United Kingdom. He has also taught Aikido at several universities including Ashton University, Birmingham University, and The University of Warwick, the last of which has a dojo called Gen Sen Jyuku which was established in 1988.

== Aikido ==
=== Training History ===
Chris Mooney began his training in 1973 under Ralph Reynolds at the Birmingham Athletic Institute. He stayed there four five years, and received his Shodan accreditation from him. Subsequently, he became a member of the West Midlands Aikikai and a student of Reynold's teacher William Smith, and finally the teacher of the line: Kazuo Chiba, with whom he spent several decades.

In 2005, on the tenth anniversary of the formation of the British Aikikai, Kazuo Chiba awarded Mooney the title of Shihan. On 17 November 2006 Doshu Moriteru Ueshiba presented the Aikikai shihan certificate to Chris Mooney at a ceremony held at Hombu Dojo in Tokyo, Japan.

He was promoted to 7th Dan by Aikido World Headquarters at the Kagamibiraki celebrations on 14 January 2018.

== Ei Mei Kan ==
Mooney first began teaching Aikido at Aston University in 1981 at the request of William Smith, and subsequently taught Aikido at Birmingham University. Eventually he left both universities and began to teach Aikido at Warwick University in 2001 where he remains today. He preserves his connection to British universities to this day, believing that the message of Aikido has particular relevance for young people in the modern world. In the mid-1980s, he established a dojo in Bearwood, Birmingham. By 1994, the dojo had relocated to Digbeth, Birmingham.

=== Fazeley Street ===
Chris Mooney's dojo began at the end of 1994 at Fazeley Street in the industrial heart-land of Birmingham, UK, though he had been teaching before that. It was housed in a large factory room with a tin roof and a large pillar right in the middle of the mat, situated above a reggae recording studio. There was a lot of natural daylight, due to a large area of single glazed windows, which created excessive heat in the summer months and a freezing cold during the winter. Many of the materials needed to build the dojo were scavenged from the industrial waste found nearby; including light fittings found in skips and old pieces of carpet and wood. The dojo lasted there for six years.

=== Northfield ===
In the year 2000, the dojo moved to the YMCA in Northfield, where the grim industrial surroundings were exchanged for the more populous South Birmingham suburbia. It was now a converted a squash court, using all the materials brought from Fazeley Street, and a lot of volunteer effort members and supporters. Although the tatami at Northfield was much smaller than at Fazeley Street, there was no longer a pillar in the middle of the mat. The dojo stayed there for nine years.

At that time, Chiba gave Mooney's dojo the name that it bears today: Ei Mei Kan — “the House of England's Light”.

=== Barnt Green ===
In 2009, Ei Mei Kan moved to its present home near Cofton Hackett, Birmingham, with the aid of many students. It was opened by Chiba at a Shinto ceremony held in the same year. It now resides in a renovated church, the old mission hall.

=== Universities ===
Chris Mooney was asked to begin teaching at Ashton University in 1981 by William Smith, at the age of twenty three. He later began to teach at Birmingham University, and in 1988 hosted his own master, Chiba, at the Munrow Sports Centre of Birmingham University for the 1988 summer school.

At the same time Ian Grubb (currently 6th Dan Shidoin) opened a dojo at the University of Warwick. He served well, leading the club until the class of 1993–94, when work commitments meant that he had to move away from the university area. Grubb was training at Ei Mei Kan, so it was natural that Chris Mooney would look after the continued instruction of the group. However, because of his own commitments at his dojo, Aston and Birmingham Universities, he sent one of his students David Cope (currently 5th Dan, Shidoin) to take over the running of the class. He served for a long time, leaving in the spring of 2002 – when, finally, Chris Mooney began teaching there himself.

...the treasures of the future are contained in the young, so where better for me to invest my time?

— Chris Mooney, Shihan

The University of Warwick aikido club was given the name Gen Sen Jyuku by the master Kazuo Chiba on his visit in 2008. The meaning literally translated is "essence of a spring" inspired by the position the club has of being the launching point of many aikidoka's careers.
