= Kisaburō =

- Gender: Male

Origin
- Origin: Japanese
- Meaning: Different meanings depending on the kanji used

Kisaburō, Kisaburo or Kisaburou (written: 喜三郎 or 紀三朗) is a masculine Japanese given name. Notable people with the name include:

- Onogawa Kisaburō (小野川 喜三郎) (1758–1806), Japanese sumo wrestler
- Kisaburo Osawa (大澤 喜三郎) (1910–1991), Japanese aikidoka
- Suzuki Kisaburō (鈴木 喜三郎) (1867–1940), Japanese politician
- Kisaburo Tokai (渡海 紀三朗) (born 1948), Japanese politician
