= Mitsuteru =

- Gender: Male

Origin
- Origin: Japanese
- Meaning: Different meanings depending on the kanji used

Mitsuteru (written: 光輝 or 充央) is a masculine Japanese given name. Notable people with the name include:

- Mitsuteru Tanaka (田中 光輝; born 1971), Japanese cyclist
- Mitsuteru Ueshiba (植芝 充央; born 1980), Japanese aikidoka
- Mitsuteru Watanabe (渡辺 光輝; born 1974), Japanese footballer
- Mitsuteru Yokoyama (横山 光輝; 1934–2004), Japanese manga artist
