= Gaku =

- Gender: Male

Origin
- Origin: Japanese
- Meaning: Different meanings depending on the kanji used

Gaku (written: 岳 or 学) is a masculine Japanese given name. Notable people with the name include:

- Gaku Hamada (濱田 岳; born 1988), Japanese actor
- Gaku Hasegawa (長谷川 岳; born 1971), Japanese politician
- Gaku Hashimoto (橋本 岳; born 1974), Japanese politician
- Gaku Hirasawa (平澤 岳; born 1973), Japanese alpine skier
- Gaku Homma (本間 学; born 1950), Japanese aikidoka
- Gaku Ishizaki (石崎 岳; born 1955), Japanese politician
- Gaku Konishi (小西 岳; born 1934), Japanese physicist
- Gaku Matsuda (松田 岳; born 1992), Japanese actor
- Gaku Matsumoto (松本 岳; born 1993), Japanese actor
- Gaku Miyao (宮尾 岳; born 1959), Japanese manga artist
- Gaku Shibasaki (柴崎 岳; born 1992), Japanese footballer
- Gaku Shindo (進藤 学; born 1980), Japanese actor and singer
- Gaku Sugamoto (菅本 岳; born 1994), Japanese footballer

== See also ==
- Gaku Station, a railway station in Yoshinogawa, Tokushima Prefecture, Japan
- Gaku: Minna no Yama, a manga series
