= Bjorn Olsen =

Bjorn Olsen may refer to:

- Bjørn E. Olsen, Norwegian fish exporter and martial artist
- Björn M. Ólsen, Icelandic scholar and politician
- Björn Olsen (skier), Icelandic alpine skier
