= Seishirō =

- Gender: Male

Origin
- Origin: Japanese
- Meaning: Different meanings depending on the kanji used

Seishirō, Seishiro or Seishirou (written: 征四郎, 征士郎, 星史郎, 誠志郎, 聖志郎 or 清史郎) is a masculine Japanese given name. Notable people with the name include:

- Seishiro Endo (遠藤 征四郎; born 1942), Japanese aikidoka
- Seishiro Etō (衛藤 征士郎; born 1941), Japanese politician
- Seishirō Itagaki (板垣 征四郎; 1885–1948), Japanese general
- Seishiro Kato (加藤 清史郎; born 2001), Japanese child actor
- Seishirō Nishida (西田 聖志郎; born 1955), Japanese actor
- Seishiro Okazaki (岡崎 星史郎; 1890–1951), Japanese American jujutsuka
- Seishirō Sakamoto (坂本 誠志郎; born 1993), Japanese baseball player
- Seishiro Shimatani (嶋谷 征四郎; 1938–2001), Japanese footballer

== Fictional characters ==
- Seishirō Nagi (凪 誠士郎), a character in the manga series Blue Lock
- Seishirō Sakurazuka (桜塚 星史郎), a character in the manga series Tokyo Babylon
- Seishirō (星史郎), a character in the manga series Tsubasa ~RESERVoir CHRoNiCLE~
