= Hiroshi Ikeda =

Hiroshi Ikeda may refer to:

- Hiroshi Ikeda (aikidoka), Japanese aikido teacher
- Hiroshi Ikeda (director), Japanese film director
