= Morito Suganuma =

Japanese aikidoka

Morito Suganuma (Japanese: 菅沼守人; born 27 July 1942) is a Japanese aikido teacher holding the rank of 8th dan in the Aikikai .

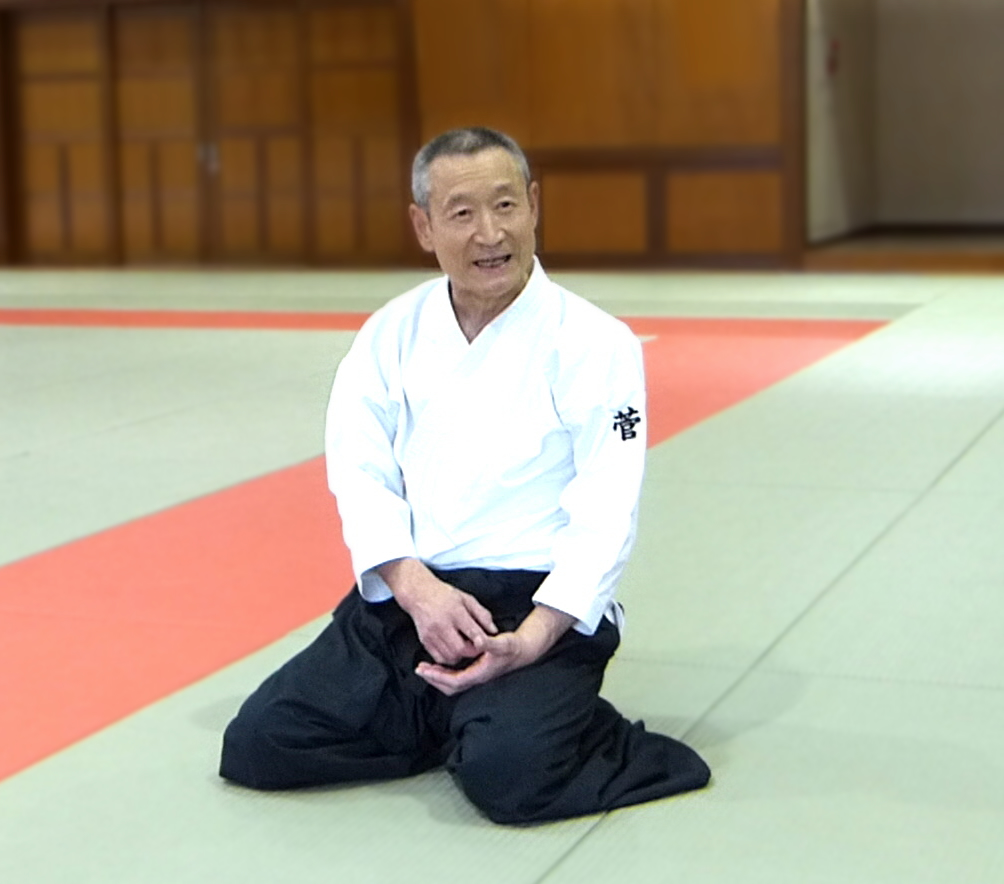
Morito Suganuma (2012)

Born in Fukushima, Japan, his first contact with aikido was in 1963 at the Asia University in Tokyo where he followed a class taught by Nobuyoshi Tamura. The next year, Tamura introduced him to the Aikikai Hombu Dojo where he started training assiduously under Morihei Ueshiba, Kisshomaru Ueshiba and other prominent Hombu instructors. He officially became an uchideshi in 1967 after graduating from university.

On 19 April 1970, shortly after the death of Morihei Ueshiba, Suganuma was sent to Fukuoka by Kisshomaru Ueshiba as the Aikikai's representative for the Kyūshū district. He is the founder and dojocho of Aikido Shoheijuku Dojo, which today encompasses about 70 dojo and 4000 students. Although primarily based in Fukuoka, he is regularly invited to give aikido seminars around the world. Seminar locations have included Vancouver, Norway, the Netherlands, Israel, and Beijing.

He received his 8th dan Aikikai in 2001.

He is also a well-known shodo master and regularly practices zen meditation and yoga.
