= Chris Mooney =

Chris Mooney may refer to:

- Chris Mooney (aikido) (born 1958), British aikidoka
- Chris Mooney (basketball) (born 1972), American college basketball coach
- Chris Mooney (journalist) (born 1977), American journalist
