= Ryōichi =

- Gender: Male

Origin
- Origin: Japanese
- Meaning: Different meanings depending on the kanji used

Ryōichi, Ryoichi, Ryouichi or Ryohichi (written: 良一, 遼一, 僚一, 亮一 or 了一) is a masculine Japanese given name. Notable people with the name include:

- Ryoichi Adachi (安達 了一; born 1988), Japanese baseball player
- Ryoichi Akamatsu (赤松 諒一; born 1995), Japanese high jumper
- Ryoichi Ariyoshi (有吉 良一; 1926–2026), American lawyer and politician
- Ryoichi Fujisawa (藤沢 良一; born 1927), Japanese Nordic combined skier
- Ryoichi Fukushige (福重 良一; born 1971), Japanese footballer
- Ryōichi Hattori (服部 良一; 1907–1993), Japanese composer
- Ryoichi Hattori (politician) (服部 良一; born 1950), Japanese politician
- Ryoichi Hirano (平野 亮一; born 1983/84), Japanese ballet dancer
- Ryoichi Ikegami (池上 遼一; born 1944), Japanese manga artist
- Ryoichi Jinnai (神内 良一; born 1926), Japanese businessman
- Ryoichi Kawakatsu (川勝 良一; born 1958), Japanese footballer and manager
- Ryoichi Kimizuka (君塚 良一; born 1958), Japanese screenwriter, television director and film director
- Kinoshita Ryoichi (木下 良一; born 1959), Japanese aikidoka
- Ryoichi Kurisawa (栗澤 僚一; born 1982), Japanese footballer
- Ryōichi Kuroda (黒田 了一; 1911–2003), Japanese lawyer and politician
- Ryoichi Maeda (前田 遼一; born 1981), Japanese footballer
- Ryōichi Sasakawa (笹川 良一; 1899–1995), Japanese businessman and politician
- Ryōichi Sekiya (關家 良一; born 1967), Japanese ultramarathon runner
- Ryoichi Taguchi (田口 良一; born 1986), Japanese boxer
- Ryoichi Takahashi (高橋 良一; 1898–1963), Japanese entomologist
- Ryōichi Tanaka (田中 亮一; born 1947), Japanese voice actor
- Ryōichi Yazu (矢頭 良一; 1878–1908), Japanese inventor
- Ryoichi Yoshida (吉田 良一; born 1965), Japanese sprinter
