= Cledonism =

Divination based on chance events or encounters

In the occult of classical antiquity, cledonism, or cledonomancy, was a kind of divination based on chance events or encounters, such as words occasionally uttered. The word is formed from the Greek κληδών, which signifies rumor, a report, omen, fame, name.

Cicero observes that the Pythagoreans made observation not only of the words of the gods, but of those of men; and accordingly believed the pronouncing of certain words, e.g. the word incendium (destruction, ruin), at a meal to be very unlucky. Thus, instead of prison, they used the word domicilium (residence, dwelling); and to avoid Erinyes, said Eumenides.

According to Pausanias, cledonism was popular at Smyrna, where the Apollonian Oracles were interpreted. He also mentions its use at the shrine of Hermes Agoraios in Pharae. An individual, upon whispering a question into the god's ear, plugged his own ears, left the agora, and then listened for the god's answer among the chance words of pedestrians. This was likely popular because the individual selectively chose which words formed the answer.

An example of cledonism occurs in the Odyssey, Book XX. Before taking vengeance on the suitors, Odysseus asks for a divine sign, and Zeus answers with a clap of thunder. This is immediately followed by words from a servant-woman, asking Zeus to "let this be the very last day that the suitors dine in the house of Odysseus."

== See also ==
- Oresteia
- Fāl-gūsh
- Kotodama
