= Kotodama =

Japanese belief that mystical powers dwell in words and names

Kotodama or kototama (言霊, sometimes written as 言魂; lit. 'word spirit/soul') refers to the Japanese belief that mystical powers dwell in words and names. English translations include "soul of language", "spirit of language", "power of language", "power word", "magic word", and "sacred sound". The notion of kotodama presupposes that sounds can affect objects, and that ritual word usages can influence the environment, body, mind, and soul. Some interpret the belief as the discovery of commands words that can affect physiology and the mind.

== Basis ==
This Japanese compound kotodama combines koto 言 "word; speech" and tama 霊 "spirit; soul" (or 魂 "soul; spirit; ghost") voiced as dama in rendaku. In contrast, the unvoiced kototama pronunciation especially refers to kototamagaku (言霊学; "study of kotodama"), which was popularized by Onisaburo Deguchi in the Oomoto religion. This field takes the Japanese gojūon phonology as the mystical basis of words and meanings, in a way that is roughly analogous to Hebrew Kabbalah.

== Etymology ==
The etymology of kotodama is uncertain, but one explanation correlating words and events links two Japanese words pronounced koto: this 言 "word; words; speech" and 事 "situation; circumstances; state of affairs; occurrence; event; incident". These two kanji were used interchangeably in the name Kotoshironushi 事代主 or 言代主, an oracular kami mentioned in the Kojiki and Nihon Shoki. Kotodama is related with Japanese words such as kotoage 言挙 "words raised up; invoke the magical power of words", kotomuke 言向 "directed words; cause submission though the power of words", and jumon 呪文 "magic spell; magic words; incantation".

== Mythology ==
Kotodama is a central concept in Japanese mythology, Shinto, and Kokugaku. For example, the Kojiki describes an ukei (or seiyaku) 誓約 "covenant; trial by pledge" between the sibling gods Susanoo and Amaterasu, "Let each of us swear, and produce children." Uttering the divine words of the Shinto divination ritual known as ukehi supposedly determines results, and in this case, Amaterasu giving birth to five male deities proved that Susanoo's intentions were pure.

== Martial arts ==
Kototama or kotodama is also fundamental to Japanese martial arts, for instance, in the use of kiai. Morihei Ueshiba, the founder of aikido and a student of Deguchi, used kototama as a spiritual basis for his teachings. William Gleason says Ueshiba "created aikido based on the kototama principle," and quotes him that "Aikido is the superlative way to practice the kototama. It is the means by which one realizes his true nature as a god and finds ultimate freedom." Mutsuro Nakazono, a disciple of Ueshiba, wrote books on the importance of kototama in aikido, such as The Kototama Principle in 1983.

== Equivalences ==
While other cultures have parallels to kotodama, such as mantra, yanling, mana, and logos, some Japanese people believe the "word spirit" is unique to the Japanese language. One of the classical names of Japan is kototama no sakiwau kuni (言霊の幸わう国; "the land where the mysterious workings of language bring bliss"), a phrase that originated in the Man'yōshū.

== See also ==
- Ancient Egyptian conception of the soul § Ren (name, identity)
- Cledonism
- Dōongo / Dōon Igigo (同音語 / 同音異義語, lit. "Like-Sound Utterance" / "Like-Sound Different-Meaning Utterance")—Homophones, while not a part of Shinto in and of themselves, occur in many things that are considered lucky are considered-so because they are homophones of things that are lucky (i.e. Jū Nana meaning, both 'great wealth'/'prosperity' and the number #17), and, likewise, many things that are considered unlucky are considered so because they are homophones of things that are unlucky (i.e. Shizan meaning, both, 'stillborn' and the number #43). See also Tetraphobia, Japanese superstitions and Onomatopoeia.
- Linguistic relativity
- Law of contagion
- Magic word
- Mantra
- Norito
- Om
  - Om mani padme hum
- Shabda
- Sympathetic magic
- True name
