= Aikido Schools of Ueshiba =

Japanese martial art organization

Aikido Schools of Ueshiba Logo

The Aikido Schools of Ueshiba (ASU) is a not-for-profit Aikido organization founded by Mitsugi Saotome Shihan upon moving from Japan to the United States in 1975 (51 years ago). It is a federation of about 110 Dojos throughout North America.

The ASU instructional syllabus includes open-hand training, defense versus weapons (tachi dori, jo dori, tanto dori), weapons kata (kumitachi), and defense against multiple attackers with and without weapons (randori). As established by Saotome Shihan, ASU strives to have "no style", and its members and instructors demonstrate a high level of individual expression in their technique and instruction. As reflected by Saotome Shihan's roles as senior instructor and Chief Weapons Instructor during his time at the Aikikai Hombu Dojo, training in ASU emphasizes martial spirit and awareness, significant weapons work, improvisation and adaptability, natural movement and breathing, and a sensitivity to natural action, reaction, and biofeedback responses. These goals are exemplified in a quote by Saotome Shihan: "Aikido is not a factory. Every student is unique; every attacker is unique."

== Affiliation ==
At its inception ASU was not formally connected to the Aikikai Foundation (Aikido World Headquarters). Formal affiliation was later established and the ranks of ASU members were recognized via the direct relationship between Saotome Sensei, the Ueshiba family, and the Aikikai Hombu Dojo. In 2016, ASU restructured and was formally recognized as an affiliated overseas organization member of the Aikikai Foundation.

== Mission and structure ==
The Aikido Schools of Ueshiba is a 501(c)(3) nonprofit organization, administered by a board of senior instructors. In addition to the actions of the board, ASU policy is reviewed and set by three standing committees: an Examination Committee, an Instructional Committee, and an Advisory Committee of ASU instructors who are not board members. Saotome Shihan and Patty Saotome Sensei remain involved in ASU administration as Special Advisors to the ASU board.

ASU's stated mission emphasizes the organization's special lineage to the founder of Aikido: "to preserve and disseminate the teachings and principles of Aikido, as transmitted by Morihei Ueshiba O Sensei to his direct disciple Mitsugi Saotome Shihan."

== Senior instructors ==
Chief Instructor: Shihan Mitsugi Saotome

- John Messores (7th dan)
- Patty Saotome (7th dan)
- Bill Gleason (7th dan)
- Tres Hofmeister (7th dan)
- George Ledyard (7th dan)
- Wendy Whited (7th dan)
- Charles Page (7th dan)
- Charles Weber (7th dan)

== Aiki Shrine ==
The Aiki Shrine was built by Saotome Shihan on his private property in Myakka City, Florida, to recreate and preserve the deep sense of spirituality and connection to nature that he recalled of the original Iwama Shrine from his years serving and living with the founder as personal live-in disciple. In 2016, Saotome Shihan transferred ownership of the Aiki Shrine to ASU to preserve as a lasting and physical legacy, and to unify future generations of ASU students and instructors through a living heritage and lineage to the spirit of O Sensei.

== Ueshiba Juku ==
The Ueshiba Juku (literally, "Academy of the Founder") is a special designation issued by Saotome Shihan to his personal disciples. Based on statements by Saotome Shihan, the designation declares that the recipients are not only true deshi (direct disciple) of Saotome Sensei and inheritors of his teachings, but are also part of O Sensei's own school and pure lineage as only a true uchi deshi of O Sensei can recognize. It is denoted by a special kanji (Japanese calligraphy) which is worn on the left lapel of the recipient's dogi (training uniform).
