= Minoru Hirai =

Minoru Hirai (平井 稔 March 1903 - 16 October 1998) was a Japanese martial artist and creator of the korindo style of aikido.

As a youth, he studied many different martial arts including Togin-ryu, Okumura Nito-ryu, Takenouchi-ryu, Kito-ryu and Saburi-ryu. By 1938, he became a master in iaido and jujutsu and established his own dojo, the Kogado dojo in Okayama.

In 1938, he met Morihei Ueshiba at Okayama, who told him about the technique of "aikibudo" he created and invited him to his dojo in Tokyo. Hirai found similarities in Ueshiba's art based on circular motions with his own style of jujutsu he was developing and decided to enter Ueshiba's Kobukan dojo.

During World War II, Hirai was the head of the jujutsu department of the Japanese Army's military police school and was instrumental in developing a new arrest technique employed by the military police.

In 1942, he was appointed director of the General Affairs for the Kobukan Dojo by Ueshiba, helping him with daily matters at the dojo. The same year he was sent as the Kobukan representative to the Dai Nippon Butoku Kai, an organization promoting martial arts in Japan, and was instrumental in creating the term "aikido" to refer to Ueshiba's art within the Butokukai's circle.

In July 1945, the Butokukai awarded him the rank of Hanshi.

He died in 1998.

== Korindo aikido ==
His own style, Korindo aikido (光輪洞合気道, Kōrindō Aikidō), was founded in 1938 and combined elements from classical jujutsu and traditional Japanese weaponry with the early teachings of Ueshiba. It is based on the principle of circular tai sabaki. In October 1945, he established the Korindo Dojo in Shizuoka. In September 1953, the Korindo Dojo in Tokyo was inaugurated.

Korindo's taisabaki consists of seven forms or kata: kesagiri, kote-sabaki, irimisabaki, shihosabaki, isogaeshi, tsuiage, and ushirosabaki. Usually they are practiced solo, but they can also be done with a partner. These seven kata are practiced to the front, back, right, and left, and they help develop the ability to apply techniques from any position. Minoru Hirai's unique taisabaki forms, which constitute the basis of his Korindo Aikido, can be practiced empty-handed, with a sword, short staff, or spear. The goal is to express the natural mind as natural martial arts techniques.
