= Hiroshi Ikeda (aikidoka) =

Japanese aikido teacher (born 1950)

- Born: January 8, 1950 (age 76); Hachijō-jima, Tokyo, Japan
- Native name: 池田 裕
- Style: Aikido
- Teacher: Mitsugi Saotome
- Rank: 8th dan

Other information
- Website: boulderaikikai.org

Hiroshi Ikeda (池田 裕, Ikeda Hiroshi; born January 8, 1950) is a Japanese aikido teacher and the founder of Boulder Aikikai in Boulder, Colorado. A senior student of Mitsugi Saotome, he holds the rank of 8th dan and the title shihan, and teaches seminars internationally.

== Early life ==
Ikeda was born in January 1950 on Hachijō-jima, an island administered as part of Tokyo. He trained in judo for three years in high school. He began aikido in 1968 (Note: A 2023 interview gives 1969.) while a student at Kokugakuin University, and in 1970 (Note: A 2023 interview gives 1971.) entered the Reimei Juku, Saotome's dojo in Tokyo.

== Career ==
In 1976 Bill McIntyre invited Saotome to teach in Florida, and Ikeda went with him as his assistant. Ikeda taught at the 12th Street Dojo in Sarasota until 1979. In 1980 he moved to Boulder, where he founded Boulder Aikikai that August.

== Teaching ==
Local newspapers have reported on Ikeda's seminars since the early 1980s, including a seminar and public demonstration at the University of Montana in 1982, a three-day seminar at New College of Florida in 1991 and a seminar in Pensacola in 2000. Later coverage includes a weekend seminar with Rick Stickles hosted by Bermuda Aikikai in 2011 and a 2013 seminar at a Santa Barbara school.

=== Students ===
- Evolene Premillieu, who moved to Boulder to train under Ikeda and Tres Hofmeister at Boulder Aikikai
