= Fāl-gūsh =

Act of eavesdropping

Fāl-gush (Persian: فالگوش) is the act of standing in a dark corner spot or behind a fence and listening to the conversations of passersby and trying to interpret their statements or the subject of their dialogue as an answer to one's questions. It is a traditional Persian custom that certain days are perfect for divination. During the last Wednesday of the year, the Chaharshanbe Suri, divination, especially by listening to the conversations of the passers by and interpreting that which is heard (fālgush) as a sign is quite common. Fortunetellers (fālgir), mostly Romani, are still active in some parts of Iran.

== Fāl-gūsh on Chahārshanbe Suri ==
On Chahārshanbe Suri night, young girls make intentions, stand behind a wall and listen to the words of passers-by; and then interpret their words to get the answer to their intentions. Saeed Nafisi reports that in his time another type of divination was common in Zanjan instead of Fāl-gūsh, in which young people insert a rope through a chimney into the house of others so that the owner of the house could tie the first thing they could find. The object that was tied to the rope was interpreted as their omen; For example, if it was sweet, it was considered a sign of sweetness .

== See also ==
- Cledonism
