= International Aikido Federation =

Sport world governing body

- Sport: Aikido
- Jurisdiction: International
- Membership: 90
- Abbreviation: IAF
- Founded: 1976
- Headquarters: Tokyo, Japan
- President: Moriteru Ueshiba Dōshu
- Chairperson: Yoko Okamoto Shihan

Official website
- aikido-international.org

International Aikido Federation (IAF) is a world governing body for the martial art of Aikido.

== Structure ==
The International Aikido Federation was formed in 1976 to serve as a primary global aikido organisation. It is an umbrella organisation with member organisations from 90 nations (for example, the All-Japan Aikido Federation is one member). All full members must be recognised by the Hombu and all associate members must be validated by the Hombu, so the IAF exclusively represents the Aikikai.

The IAF is a nominally democratic organisation but special roles are given to the Aikido Doshu and a council of senior instructors, to safeguard the "technical and moral" integrity of aikido. The IAF President is always the Aikido Doshu. He is responsible for the spirit and technical standards of Aikido.

The IAF currently admits only one member organisation per country and gives each full member an equal vote (it was modeled on the UN; it does not necessarily give every Aikikai student equal representation).

The IAF also organises International Aikido Congresses every four years, facilitating direct training between aikido students of different countries, sharing instruction by the world's most senior aikido instructors, and also providing a channel for official communication with the Hombu.

The membership of the IAF has grown to 87 member countries in April 2024, of which 13 are associate members without voting power.

The IAF publishes a list of member nations and organisations.

Chairpersons of the International Aikido Federation
#	država	name	mandate	
1	France	Guy Bonnefond Shihan (1974 – 1984)	1974	1984
2	Italy	Giorgio Veneri Shihan (1937 – 2005)	1984	1996
3	United Kingdom	Peter Goldsbury Shihan (born 1944)	1996	2016
4	Japan	Kei Izawa Shihan (born 1951)	2016	2021
5	Netherland	Wilko Vriesman Shihan (born 1958)	2021	2024
6	Japan	Yoko Okamoto Shihan (born 1956)	2024	present

== Events ==
=== International Aikido Federation Congress ===
Every four years, the IAF holds a Congress in Japan where delegations from all member countries gather for a week of practice under the direction of numerous high ranked instructors, both Japanese and foreign. Along with the seminar are held directing committee meetings, liaison meetings as well as elections.

The last congress where delegates attended in person took place in the city of Takasaki (Gunma) in September 2016. No Congress was held in 2020 due the Covid-19 Pandemic. But on 13 October 2021 a virtual congress was held online during which new elections took place. Notwithstanding the pandemic, momentum in growth was thereby regained and accelerated.

The next congress is scheduled to take place from 30 September to 6 October 2024 in Tokyo, Japan. The IAF General Assembly, during which new elections is set to take place, shall be held on 30 September and 1 October 2024. The official delegates from member countries shall be able to participate either online or in person. The accompanying International Aikido Seminar - which is open for participation by all aikido practitioners worldwide - shall be conducted from 2 to 6 October 2024. As this is the 14th congress to be organized by the IAF, the combined event is called the IAF 14th Summit.

=== Other Events ===
The IAF represents Aikido in the global sports arena where it introduces this non-competitive martial art to the sporting world by participating in events only through demonstrations.

The IAF demonstrated aikido at several chapters of the World Games as organized by the International World Games Association (IWGA).

The IAF also demonstrated aikido at all the chapters of the World Combat Games of SportAccord that took place in China (2010), Russia (2013) and in Saudi Arabia (2023), respectively.
