= Seiseki Abe =

Japanese shodo and aikido teacher

Seiseki Abe (阿部醒石, Abe Seiseki) (April 26, 1915 – May 18, 2011, Osaka, Japan) was a Japanese shodo and aikido teacher who had a unique relationship with aikido founder Morihei Ueshiba, being both his student in aikido and his teacher in calligraphy.

== Early life ==
Born in Takatsuki, Osaka, Seiseki Abe was introduced to the art of calligraphy by his father in 1934 and became a shodo teacher in 1948, teaching in his hometown of Osaka. Finding himself in a sort of spiritual crisis early in his calligraphy career, he started training in misogi under Kenzo Futaki, director of the Misogi no Renseikai ("Misogi Training Society"), who happened to be a former student of Morihei Ueshiba. Futaki advised him to learn aikido.

== Seiseki Abe and Morihei Ueshiba ==
Abe met Morihei Ueshiba at the inauguration of the aikido dojo of Bansen Tanaka in Osaka in 1952 and began training immediately. He was particularly struck by the similarity between the breathing technique used in aikido, misogi and shodo and arrived to the conclusion that the three arts are pursuing the same ultimate goal - the comprehension of the concept of ki. He studied aikido under Ueshiba for many years while perfecting his shodo technique. Ueshiba gradually took interest in calligraphy and one day asked Abe to teach him shodo (around 1954). A very special relationship developed between the two men and from 1959 until his death, Ueshiba would regularly come to stay at Abe's home in Osaka to learn calligraphy and teach aikido at the traditional dojo Abe built for him just next to his house (the Ameno Takemusu Juku Dojo). Abe was verbally awarded the grade of 10th dan by Ueshiba, although the Aikikai only recognized him as 8th dan.

== Later career ==
After the death of Ueshiba in 1969, Abe continued to teach both shodo and aikido at his dojo in Osaka. He had formed over 200 shodo shihan and had about 3000 students in the Kansai region as well as in the United States (New York, Los Angeles) and in Australia. He was an active member of the Nitten, the most important art organization in Japan. In aikido, one of his most notable former students is the movie actor and martial artist Steven Seagal.

Abe is the author of the large "Aiki Jinja" stone carving at the Aiki Jinja shrine in Iwama.
