= Seishiro Endo =

Seishiro Endo (遠藤征四郎, Endō Seishirō), born 1942, is an 8th dan ranked Aikikai aikido master teacher. Endō is among the few living people who studied directly under aikido founder Morihei Ueshiba.

He trained at Aikikai Hombu Dojo with master teachers including Seigo Yamaguchi, Hiroshi Tada, Mitsunari Kanai, and Yasuo Kobayashi.

When Endo was 30 years old he dislocated his right shoulder. According to an interview, that event brought him to a turning point. After the injury, Yamaguchi said to him, "You’ve been doing aikido for 10 years now, but now you have only your left arm to use, what are you going to do?" This prompted Endo to pursue a different direction in his Aikido. His Aikido eventually became a lot softer and more contact-based.

== Teaching methodology ==
Endo teaches mostly principles on how to connect to your partner and how to move freely. There is less focus on learning a large number of techniques. He also emphasizes that each student must confirm his feeling during each part of an exercise or technique. He talks about concentration of ki, relaxation of the upper body, flexible movement and calmness of the mind at all times. He also encourages his students to be investigative and not to accept things that are taught without confirming it for themselves.

I began to ceaselessly examine and confirm my state of mind: myself when it went well, myself when it went poorly, myself when I was trying to defeat my partner, myself when I was feeling fear, myself when I was feeling insecure, etc. From these confirmations, I learned the importance of ceaselessly keeping my mind calm.

== Saku Dojo ==
In 1993, he created the Aikido Saku Dojo in his hometown of Saku, Nagano, Japan.

== Instructional DVDs ==
After opening his own dojo, Endo started to document his Aikido through a series of instructional DVDs under the name of WayMastery Store. Some of the videos are covering certain basic principles, while others are exploring how to deal with a particular attack. A special series of DVDs showing Endo teaching at seminars abroad has also been released.

=== Aikido basic technique DVDs ===
- Kihon no Kata
- Atari and Musubi
- Sabaki and Tsukai

=== Basic practice method DVDs ===
- Katate-dori.
- Shomen-uchi. Basic Practice Methods.
- Yokomen-uchi.
- Suwari-waza Kokyuho, Ryote-dori.
- Morote-dori, Ushiro-ryote-dori.

=== Aikido seminar DVDs ===
- Seminar in Washington, D.C.
- Stillness and Movement as One and Two-Attacker Practice

== Overseas teaching schedule ==
Endō regularly gives demonstrations and seminars internationally. His schedule in 2011 includes seminars in Finland, Sweden, Canada, USA, Czech Republic, Belgium, Germany, Slovakia, Russia, France, Liechtenstein, China, Austria, Hungary, and Spain.
