= Gaku Homma =

Japanese aikidoka

Homma Gaku
- Born: May 12, 1950 (age 76); Akita Prefecture, Japan
- Native name: 本間 学 Gaku Honma
- Style: Aikido
- Teacher: Morihei Ueshiba

Homma Gaku (本間 学 Honma Gaku), born May 12, 1950, is an aikido teacher and direct student of the founder Morihei Ueshiba.

He is an author; the books Children and the Martial Arts and Aikido for Life are his most prominent publications.

Homma, whose father was a Shinto priest and an officer in the Japanese Imperial Army during the war, was born in Akita Prefecture. According to Homma, at the age of 14, he was sent by his father to train in Iwama under aikido founder Ueshiba Morihei. Homma also says that he trained as an uchi deshi in Iwama and at the Aikikai Hombu Dojo in Tokyo, under the founder and under Saito Morihiro in the late 1960s. Along with Hideo Hirasawa, Homma is one of a number of aikidoka who claim to be the last uchi deshi to have been trained directly by Ueshiba Morihei.

His early career as a teacher was on a US air force base. In 1976 Homma moved to Denver, Colorado, and founded the Nippon Kan as an independent dojo in 1978. This dojo has grown into the largest aikido dojo in the Rocky Mountain region and is well known for its international uchi-deshi program. He has organized several large aikido seminars in Denver, many of them taught by Saito Morihiro.

== Humanitarian work ==
In addition to the aikido dojo, which is a non-profit institution, Homma has founded the Aikido Humanitarian Active Network (AHAN), whose mission is "to extend the philosophy of Aikido into the world beyond the dojo". AHAN activities have included sending computers and aid to an orphanage in Mongolia, supporting a sick aikido student in Nicaragua, and assisting dojo in Turkey and Brazil with charitable fundraising efforts.

Homma is also known for his work in his community, including serving meals to the homeless. Homma calls the work he does "support" because, he says, "Help is 'I am reaching down to you." Support is, 'I am on your level and I am lifting up."
