= Norwegian Food Research Institute =

Norwegian research institute

- Headquarters: Tromsø, Norway
- Key people: Bente E. Torstensen (CEO)Thomas Henning Farstad (chairman, 2022)
- Revenue: (707 million NOK (2022))
- Number of employees: 397 (2022)
- Website: https://nofima.com

The Norwegian Institute of Food, Fisheries and Aquaculture Research (also known as Nofima), is a food science research institute in Norway. The head office is located in Tromsø, with research activities in Bergen, Stavanger, Sunndalsøra, Tromsø and Ås.

Nofima was established on 1 January 2008, following a political decision to merge four research institutions (Matforsk, Fiskeriforskning, Norconserv and Akvaforsk). Nofima has approximately 390 employees.

The current CEO of Nofima is Bente E. Torstensen.
