= Mitsuteru Ueshiba =

Japanese aikidoka (born 1981)

- Born: June 27, 1981 (age 45); Tokyo, Japan
- Native name: 植芝 充央 Ueshiba Mitsuteru
- Nationality: Japanese
- Style: Aikido
- Teachers: Moriteru Ueshiba, Kisshomaru Ueshiba

Other information
- Children: Hiroteru Ueshiba

Mitsuteru Ueshiba (植芝 充央, Ueshiba Mitsuteru; born 1981) is a Japanese teacher of aikido. He is a great-grandson of Morihei Ueshiba and son of the current Dōshu, Moriteru Ueshiba. In keeping with the iemoto system, he is expected to succeed his father as Dōshu.

== Biography ==
From April 2012, Ueshiba is Dojocho of the Aikikai Hombu Dojo, and as such is referred to as Waka-sensei (若先生, "young master"). This term was applied to Moriteru Ueshiba when the second Dōshu Kisshomaru Ueshiba was still alive, and to Kisshomaru when the founder was still alive. More than simply a title of respect, it is intended to refer to the heir apparent successor who will take on leadership after his father.

== Works ==
- An Introduction to Aikido Mastering the Basics Through Proper Training (2020)

Preceded by Moriteru Ueshiba	Dōjōchō of Aikikai Hombu Dōjō; 2012 – present	Succeeded by Incumbent
