= Nichirei =

Japanese food company

Nichirei Corporation

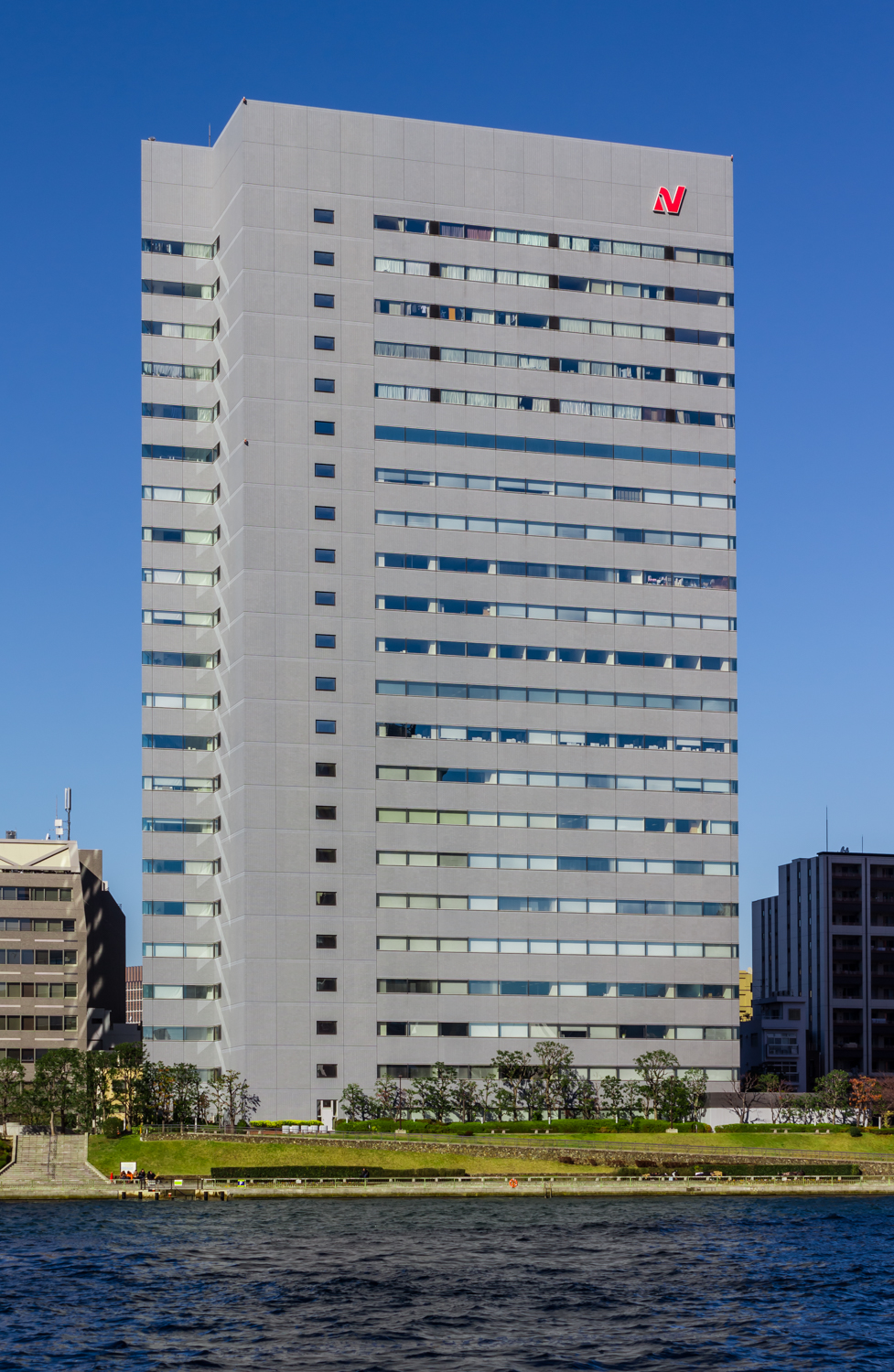
- Headquarters in Tokyo, Japan
- Native name: ニチレイ株式会社
- Romanized name: Nichirei Kabushiki-gaisha
- Formerly: Teikoku Marine Products Control Company (1942-1945); Nippon Reizo Co., Ltd. (1945-1985)
- Type: Public (K.K)
- Traded as: TYO: 2871
- Industry: Processed foods, marine products, meat and poultry products, logistics, real estate, biosciences
- Founded: 24 December 1942; 83 years ago
- Headquarters: Tsukiji, Chūō, Tokyo, Japan
- Key people: Mitsudo Urano (Chairman); Toshiaki Murai (President)
- Net income: ▲$109.3 million (FY 2010)
- Number of employees: 15,296 (as of 31 March 2022)
- Subsidiaries: Nichirei Foods; Nichirei Fresh; Nichirei Logistics Group
- Website: www.nichirei.co.jp/english/

Nichirei Corporation (株式会社ニチレイ, Kabushiki-gaisha Nichirei) is one of Japan's top producers of frozen foods and a leader in cold storage warehousing, headquartered in Tokyo. Operating through around 80 subsidiaries and affiliates worldwide, its businesses include processed food, logistics, marine products (chiefly roe, shrimp, and octopus), meat and poultry, real estate, and biosciences. The company's bioscience work includes antibody development and manufacturing, immunology products, and natural materials processing.

== History ==
The company was founded on 24 December 1942, as Teikoku Marine Products Control Company, with capital participation from 18 fisheries and other companies. It was established in accordance with the Fisheries Control Ordinance originally enacted on 19 May 1942, as a central agency to control seafood-related businesses such as sales of marine products, ice production, and refrigerated storage. On 1 December 1945, the day after the control ordinance was abolished (30 November 1945), the company was reorganized as a privately held company governed by the commercial code, and was renamed Nippon Reizo Co. Ltd. The new company was listed on the Tokyo Stock Exchange in 1949. Nippon Reizon changed its name to the Nichirei Corporation in 1985.
