= Korino =

Korino Корино
- Village
- Location within Vologda Oblast Location within Russia
- Coordinates: 59°37′N 40°50′E
- Country: Russia
- Region: Vologda Oblast
- District: Sokolsky District
- Time zone: UTC+3:00

Korino (Russian: Корино) is a rural locality (a village) in Vorobyovskoye Rural Settlement, Sokolsky District, Vologda Oblast, Russia. The population was 28 as of 2002.

== Geography ==
Korino is located 62 km northeast of Sokol (the district's administrative centre) by road. Novoye is the nearest rural locality.
