= Bansen Tanaka =

Japanese aikidoka

- Born: 21 March 1912; Osaka, Japan
- Died: December 1988 (aged 76)
- Nationality: Japanese
- Style: Aikido
- Teacher: Morihei Ueshiba
- Rank: 9th dan

Other information
- Notable students: Yukio Kawahara, Higuchi Takanari, Seiji Tomita, Ishu Ishiyama

Bansen Tanaka (田中 万川, Tanaka Bansen; 21 March 1912, Osaka – December 1988) was a Japanese aikido teacher and a pre-war and post-war disciple of aikido founder Morihei Ueshiba.

== Biography ==
Tanaka was a judo practitioner when he met Morihei Ueshiba in 1936. Eager to learn about aikido, he set up a dojo in Osaka for Noriaki (Yoichiro) Inoue, early student and nephew of Ueshiba. He followed Inoue and Ueshiba's teachings until 1939 when he was drafted to go to war. His proficiency in aikido secured him a position as a bodyguard in the army. He returned to Osaka after the war and resumed the practice of aikido. He also went to Iwama (during the construction of his dojo in Osaka) and trained alongside other renowned students of Ueshiba. He was one of the few students who trained with Ueshiba before and after the war.

Ueshiba contacted Tanaka in 1951 and suggested to him that he build his own dojo in Osaka, what would become the future Osaka Aikikai Dojo. After the dojo's inauguration (early 1952), Ueshiba spent several months there teaching aikido and he frequently returned to visit and teach.

Tanaka remained the chief instructor at the Osaka Aikikai until his death. He was 9th dan Aikikai. Yukio Kawahara, technical director of the Canadian Aikido Federation, Higuchi Takanari, chief instructor of the Kyoto Renmei Dojo, Seiji Tomita, founder of the Ban Sen Juku school in Belgium and Ishu Ishiyama, chief instructor of the Vancouver West Aikikai Dojo figure among his students.

Ban Sen Juku, headquartered in Belgium and having dojos in France, Reunion Island, Spain, Tahiti, and the United Kingdom, is an international school for aikido named after Bansen Tanaka.
