= Mitsugi Saotome =

Japanese aikido instructor (born 1937)

Saotome-Sensei teaching at the 2003 Summer Camp in the Rockies

Mitsugi Saotome (五月女 貢, Saotome Mitsugi) (born in 1937) is a Japanese aikido teacher currently living in the United States. He was a direct disciple of the founder of aikido, Morihei Ueshiba.

== Biography ==
At the age of 16, Mitsugi Saotome began his martial arts training in judo. At the age of 18, he entered the Aikikai Hombu Dojo in Tokyo in order to train under Ueshiba. Records provided personally from Kisshomaru Ueshiba, to the Saotome family from Hombu Dojo, detail a first degree black belt in 1957, and second degree black belt in 1958. Kisshomaru Ueshiba goes on to confirm that Mitsugi Saotome became an uchi-deshi (live-in student at the dojo) in April 1959, receiving subsequent promotions to sixth degree black belt (Shihan) in January 1968, and remained uchi-deshi until the founder's death in April 1969. Mitsugi Saotome trained at Hombu Dojo for a total of 15 years.

He was very well respected as an instructor, receiving many honors. As a senior instructor in Aikido he was the Chief Weapons Instructor at Hombu. He held that position until 1975.

At this time Saotome began to give great thought and contemplation as to his future purpose. After many days of consideration, he was said to have felt the hand of divine spiritual intervention. This was instrumental in his decision to relocate to the United States. He felt that the US was at a point of development that embraced new ideas, and that this would be an ideal environment to spread the message of peace and harmony implicit in the study of aikido.

Saotome was asked about his decision to move to the US:

"I meditated on Ōsensei's spirit for three days and three nights and I felt it was his wish that I should go. This country is a great experiment, a melting pot of people from many different cultural backgrounds living together, the world condensed into one nation. The goal of aikido and Ōsensei's dream is that all the peoples of the world live together as one family, in harmony with each other and with their environment. The United States has the opportunity to set a great example."

After relocating to Sarasota, Florida in 1975, Saotome founded an organization known as Aikido Schools of Ueshiba. He has continued to serve as chief instructor for the organization, which rejoined the Aikikai and resumed its association with Hombu Dojo (world Aikido headquarters) in 1988.

== Contributions ==
Saotome is especially skilled in the use of traditional Japanese weapons, including the wooden staffs jo and bo, and the wooden sword bokken. He has also developed a system for working with two swords in aikido. Saotome feels that learning the movements and skills associated with proficiency in these weapons not only increases speed and agility, but harmony with one's partner. Saotome Sensei has been described by Aikido Journal as "One of the most highly regarded of contemporary aikido masters. His style of aikido is minimal and powerful. Razor sharp technique with superb control."

Mitsugi Saotome currently resides in the state of Florida in the US. He continues to teach seminars at the Aiki Shrine Dojo in Myakka City, Florida, and at locations throughout the United States.

== Bibliography ==
- Saotome, Mitsugi (1986). Aikido and the Harmony of Nature. Boston: Shambala. p. 251. ISBN 0-87773-855-6.
- Saotome, Mitsugi (2004). Living by Design. Susan Perry. p. 109. ISBN 0-941736-16-4.
- Saotome, Mitsugi (1989). The Principles of Aikido. Boston: Shambala. p. 223. ISBN 0-87773-409-7.
- Saotome, Mitsugi (2015). A Light on Transmission. Cedar-Forge Press. p. 164. ISBN 978-1936672981.

== Filmography ==
- Saotome, Mitsugi (22 May 2014). Takemusu Aiki (DVD). Aikido Today Magazine.
- Saotome, Mitsugi (1 March 2000). Sword of Aikido (DVD). Aikido Today Magazine.
- Saotome, Mitsugi. Oyo Henka Aikido (DVD). Aikido Today Magazine.
- Saotome, Mitsugi. Staff of Aikido (DVD). Aikido Today Magazine.
- Saotome, Mitsugi (2 March 2000). Two Swords of Aikido (VHS / DVD). Aikido Today Magazine. ISBN 0941736555.
- Saotome, Mitsugi. Two Swords of Aikido (DVD). Aikido Today Magazine.
