= Teruyasu Honma =

Japanese ice hockey player

Personal information
- Nationality: Japanese
- Born: 7 March 1949 (age 76) Hokkaido, Japan

Sport
- Sport: Ice hockey

Teruyasu Honma (本間 照康, Honma Teruyasu; born 7 March 1949) is a Japanese ice hockey player. He competed in the men's tournament at the 1972 Winter Olympics.
