= Kisaburo Osawa =

Japanese aikido teacher (1910–1991)

- Born: 1910; Kumayama, Saitama, Japan
- Died: May 26, 1991 (aged 80–81); Tokyo, Japan
- Native name: 大澤喜三郎 Ōsawa Kisaburō
- Style: Aikido

Kisaburo Osawa (Japanese: 大澤喜三郎, Hepburn: Ōsawa Kisaburō; 1910 – May 26, 1991) was an influential aikido teacher who taught for many years at the Aikikai Hombu Dojo and was a close advisor to Kisshomaru Ueshiba Dōshu.

== Biography ==
Born in Kumagaya, Saitama prefecture, Japan, he started practicing judo at the age of 17 in order to fortify his body. In 1939 he was introduced to Morihei Ueshiba and entered the Aikikai (Kobukan at the time).

He became one of the most important and influential aikido teachers during the 1950s to 1970s, being the director of the Aikikai Hombu Dojo for many years until 1986 when he was replaced by Morihei's grandson and present dōshu, Moriteru Ueshiba. He held the rank of 9th dan.

His son, Hayato Osawa (b. 1951) is currently a prominent Aikikai Hombu Dojo shihan holding the rank of 8th dan.

One of his most prominent students is Katsuyuki Shimamoto, who holds the rank of 8th dan.

Preceded by Kisshomaru Ueshiba (de jure)	de facto Dōjōchō of Aikikai Hombu Dōjō; 1989–1999	Succeeded by Moriteru Ueshiba (de jure)
