= Moriteru Ueshiba =

Japanese teacher of aikido (born 1951)

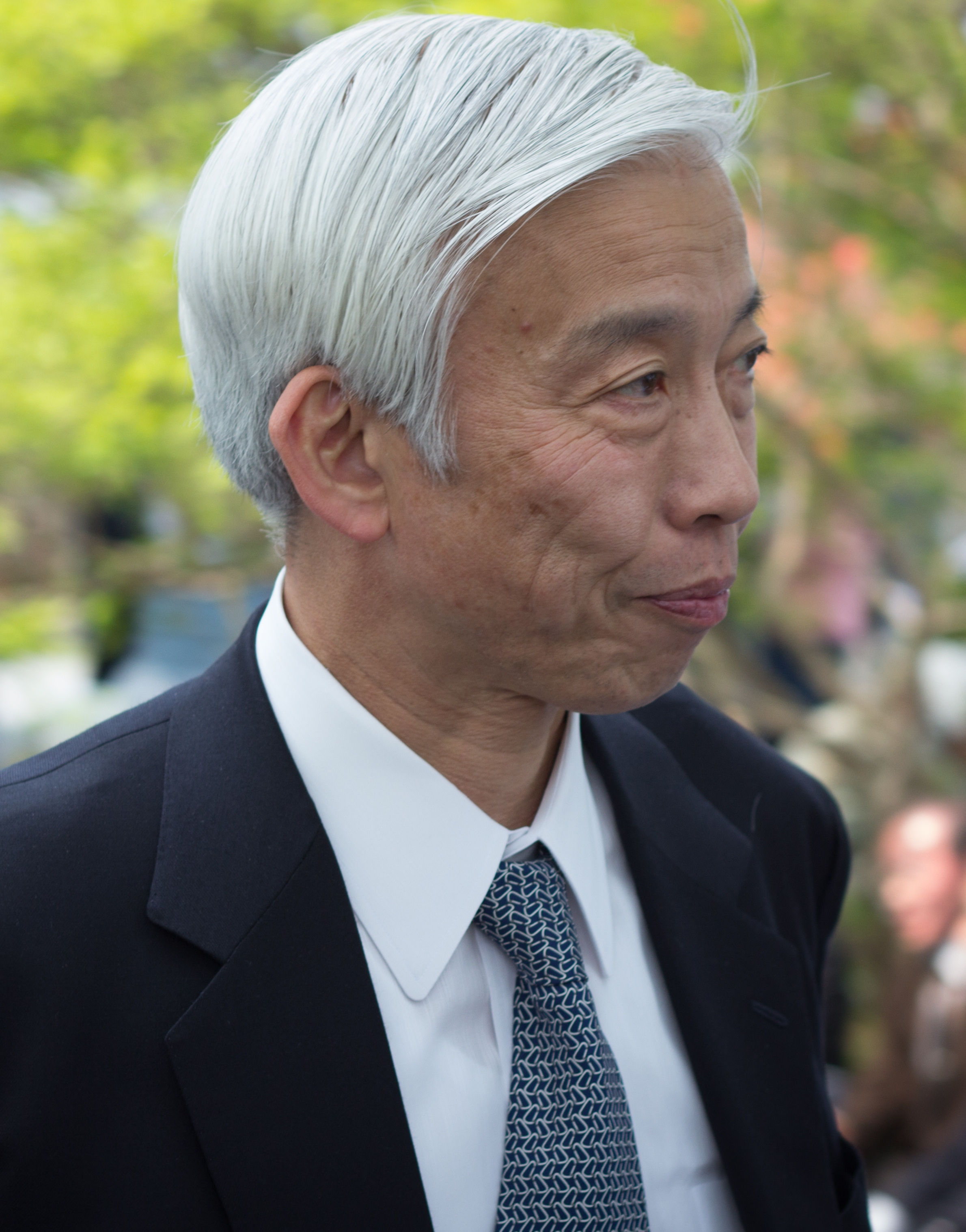
- Born: 2 April 1951 (age 75); Tokyo, Japan
- Native name: 植芝 守央 Ueshiba Moriteru
- Nationality: Japanese
- Style: Aikido
- Teachers: Kisshomaru Ueshiba, Morihei Ueshiba
- Rank: 3rd Dōshu

Other information
- Children: Mitsuteru Ueshiba

Moriteru Ueshiba (植芝 守央, Ueshiba Moriteru; born 2 April 1951) is a Japanese teacher of aikido. He is a grandson of Morihei Ueshiba and son of Kisshomaru Ueshiba. Ueshiba is the third and current Dōshu.

== Biography ==
Ueshiba was born on 2 April 1951, in Tokyo, Japan. Recalling his childhood during a 2004 interview, he said, "The first time I wore an Aikido uniform I was in the first grade of elementary school. But my family didn’t force me to do keiko (training) then, I just did it when I felt like it. I started training seriously in my high school years. My intention then was to become a successor to my father, and to preserve Kaiso’s [Morihei Ueshiba's] legacy for the future."

In 1976, Ueshiba graduated from Meiji Gakuin University with a degree in economics. In 1996, he assumed the position of Dojocho (director/owner) of Aikikai Hombu Dojo. In 1997, he visited Ireland. He assumed the title of Dōshu on 4 January 1999, following the death of his father, Kisshomaru Ueshiba. In January 2006, as part of Aiki-Kai Australia's 40th anniversary, Ueshiba visited and taught in Australia. Also, in 2019 he led a seminar in San Mateo organized by the California Aikido Association. On the occasion of the 60th anniversary of the New York Aikikai, he held a seminar in Galloway, New Jersey in 2025.

In 2006, Ueshiba awarded the Anchieta Medal of São Paulo, Brazil. In 2009 he awarded the Order of Friendship from the President of Russia. Also, in 2012 he awarded the Gold Medal of Valencia Polytechnic University in Spain and in 2013 he receives the Medal with Blue Ribbon of Honor from the Emperor of Japan. In 2025 Dōshu was awarded by Emperor of Japan the Order of the Rising Sun, Gold Rays with Rosette for the spread and promotion of aikido during the Spring Honors.

Following the iemoto system, he is expected to be succeeded as Dōshu by his son Mitsuteru Ueshiba.

== Works ==
- Best Aikido: The fundamentals (2002, co-authored with Kisshomaru Ueshiba)
- The Aikido master course: Best Aikido 2 (2003)
- Progressive Aikido: The essential elements (2005)

Preceded by Kisshomaru Ueshiba	Dōshu; 4 January 1999–present	Succeeded by Incumbent
Preceded by Kisaburo Osawa	Dōjōchō of Aikikai Hombu Dōjō; 1986–2012	Succeeded by Mitsuteru Ueshiba
