= Kisshomaru Ueshiba =

2nd Aikido Dōshu (1969–1999)

- Born: 27 June 1921; Ayabe, Kyoto Prefecture, Japan
- Died: 4 January 1999 (aged 77); Tokyo, Japan
- Native name: 植芝 吉祥丸 Ueshiba Kisshomaru
- Nationality: Japanese
- Style: Aikido
- Teacher: Morihei Ueshiba
- Rank: 2nd Dōshu

Other information
- Children: Moriteru Ueshiba

Kisshomaru Ueshiba (植芝 吉祥丸, Ueshiba Kisshōmaru; 27 June 1921 – 4 January 1999) was a Japanese teacher of aikido. He was the son of Morihei Ueshiba. After his father's death in 1969, he became the 2nd Dōshu.

== Biography ==
He was born on 27 June 1921, in the city of Ayabe, Kyoto Prefecture, Japan. He was the third son and fourth child of Morihei Ueshiba and Hatsu Ueshiba (née Itokawa). Ueshiba began training under his father around 1937.

In 1942, while Ueshiba was still studying at Waseda University, his father Morihei (who was mostly retired to Iwama) appointed him the head of the Kobukan Dojo in Shinjuku, Tokyo. He saved the dojo from fire bombing several times during the World War II. Ueshiba graduated from Waseda University, Faculty of Economics and Political Science with a degree in economics in 1946.

Speaking about the period just after World War II, his son Moriteru Ueshiba said, "there was not yet much activity at the Hombu Dojo. For a time my father was actually in Iwama instead ... starting around 1949, he worked for about seven years at a company called Osaka Shoji. He had no other choice. Even if you have a dojo, you can't make a living if nobody is coming to train, which was largely the case after the war. So, he took a job as an ordinary company employee during the day and taught only in the mornings and evenings."

Beginning in 1948, Ueshiba oversaw the development of the Aikikai Hombu organization (and eventually the tearing down of the Kobukan Dojo in 1967 to construct the Aikikai headquarters). In 1952, Ueshiba became a founding member and appointed head of the Aikido Division of the Kokusai Budoin (International Martial Arts Federation) by Prince Kaya Tsunenori to help spread aikido worldwide.

After Morihei Ueshiba's death in 1969, Ueshiba took on the mantle of Dōshu (hereditary head). In 1986, in recognition of his contributions to the public good through the development and growth of Aikido, Ueshiba received the Medal of Honor with Blue Ribbon from the Japanese Government. In 1990, In recognition of his distinguished services and contributions to cultural exchange between France and Japan, Ueshiba received a gold medal Sports Merit award from the French government. This is the first time a Japanese citizen has received this medal. In 1995, Ueshiba received the Third Order of the Sacred Treasure Award from the Japanese government. In 1999 he was awarded by Emperor of Japan the Order of the Rising Sun. By 1998, Ueshiba's health had declined and this necessitated visits to hospital.

Ueshiba died around 5:30 PM on 4 January 1999, in a Tokyo hospital. The cause of death was respiratory failure.

== Works ==
- Aikido (1985)
- The Spirit of Aikido (1981)
- Best Aikido: The fundamentals (2002, co-authored with Moriteru Ueshiba)
- The Art of Aikido: Principles and Essential Techniques (2004)
- A Life in Aikido: The Biography of Founder Morihei Ueshiba (2008)

| Preceded by Morihei Ueshiba | 2nd Dōshu; 26 April 1969 – 4 January 1999 | Succeeded by Moriteru Ueshiba |
| Preceded by Koichi Tohei (de facto) | de jure Dōjōchō of Aikikai Hombu Dōjō; 1969–1989 | Succeeded by Kisaburo Osawa (de facto) |
