= Aikikai =

School of aikido

Coordinates: 35°41′56.9″N 139°42′51.5″E

Aikikai Foundation (公益財団法人合気会 Kōeki Zaidan Hōjin Aikikai)
- Also known as: Aikikai; Aikikai Honbu
- Date founded: c.1948
- Country of origin: Japan
- Founder: Morihei Ueshiba
- Current head: Moriteru Ueshiba Dōshu
- Arts taught: Aikido
- Ancestor schools: Daitō-ryū Aiki-jūjutsu • Tenjin Shin'yō-ryū • Yagyū Shingan-ryū
- Official website: http://www.aikikai.or.jp

Aikido
- Mitsuteru Ueshiba at the 55th All Japan Aikido Demonstration held at the Nippon Budokan (May 2017)
- Highest governing body: International Aikido Federation

Characteristics
- Contact: Yes
- Mixed-sex: Yes
- Type: Martial art

Presence
- Country or region: Worldwide
- Olympic: No
- World Games: 1989 – 2005 (invitational)

The Aikikai is the original school of Aikido. It is centered on the Aikikai Foundation in Japan, and its figurehead is the Doshu (the family heir of the founder of Aikido). It is represented globally through the International Aikido Federation.

== Aikikai Foundation ==
The Aikikai Foundation (公益財団法人合気会, Kōeki Zaidan Hōjin Aikikai) is the original aikido organization. It has been an incorporated entity in Japan since 1940 under the name Kōbukai Foundation (財団法人皇武会, Zaidan Hojin Kōbukan), then re-registered under the name "Aikikai" after the ban on Aikido practice was lifted by the GHQ in 1948. It is headed by the doshu, the living successor of the founder of aikido.

The Aikikai Foundation operates Hombu dojo, which is also named Aikido World Headquarters. It is sometimes called the Aikikai Hombu to distinguish it from the headquarters of later aikido organisations. It is located in Tokyo. The term "Hombu" may sometimes be used loosely to refer to the upper echelons of instructors at Hombu dojo, or to the Aikikai Foundation itself.

The Aikikai Foundation also currently manages one satellite dojo, the historical Iwama dojo in Ibaraki (about 100 km northeast of Tokyo).

The Aikikai Foundation sends instructors around Japan on a continual basis. It also issues certificates of grading and instructor titles legitimated by the Doshu throughout the world.

In April 2012, the Aikikai Foundation became a "Public Interest Incorporated Foundation (Japan)".

== Dōshu ==
Dōshu (道主; どうしゅ) literally translates as 'Master of the Way'. It is the title denoting the head of the Aikikai, although the same term could be used as a title within other disciplines. In Japanese, its most common meaning is specific to the Aikikai Foundation.

The system of having the heir of a martial arts school be the previous headmaster's son (either natural or adopted for the sake of succession) was common in koryū ('traditional schools') and such heirs often are referred to as iemoto.

- Founder (開祖, Kaiso) Morihei Ueshiba (1883-1969) originated the art of Aikido. Sometimes referred to as dōshu during his time, but more commonly known as O-sensei ('great teacher').
- Second dōshu Kisshomaru Ueshiba (1921–1999) took over leadership of the organisation and assumed the title of dōshu in 1969 upon the death of his father, the founder. Kisshomaru was the first person in aikido to be widely referred to by the title dōshu.
- Third dōshu Moriteru Ueshiba (born 1951) is the current holder of the title. Grandson of the founder. Succeeded to the position in 1999 upon the death of his father.

According to the tradition, Moriteru is expected to be succeeded as dōshu by his son, Mitsuteru Ueshiba (born 1981).

== Hombu Dōjō ==
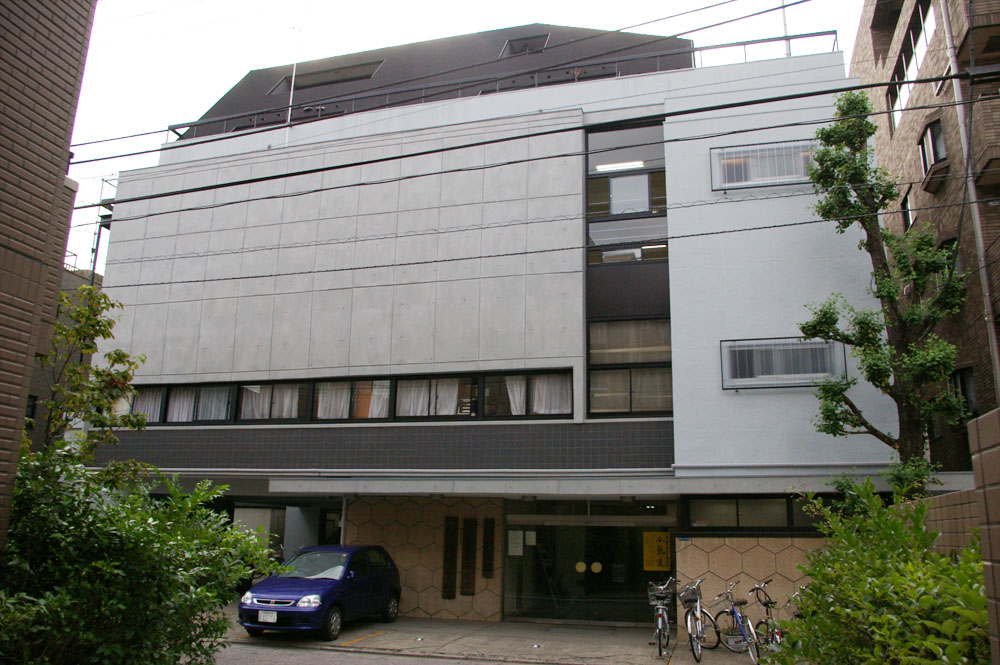
Aikikai Hombu Dōjō

The Hombu Dōjō in Tokyo is the headquarters of the Aikikai.

The Hombu Dōjō is officially named Aikido World Headquarters, and is entirely operated by the Aikikai Foundation. It is sometimes called the Aikikai Hombu to distinguish it from the headquarters of later aikido organisations.

Hombu Dōjō has about 30 instructors, and most are shihan. The instructors include the Doshu and Hiroshi Tada 9th dan.

The location of Hombu Dōjō is in Wakamatsu-cho, Shinjuku, Tokyo, Japan. (This same location was formerly the Ushigome District of Shinjuku.)

The dōjō was established in April 1931 by the founder of Aikido. It was originally named Kōbukan Dōjō (皇武館道場, imperial warrior training hall) but was called Hombu Dōjō after World War II.

In 1967 the original single-story wooden structure was replaced by a five-story modern building. Training takes place in three rooms which total about 250 tatami in area. The main training area has 105 tatami mats (170m^{2}). The other two training areas, containing 72 and 42 tatami mats respectively, are often used for beginner's classes, children's classes, women's classes, or fixed term and enrollment "academy" courses.

Classes are held seven days a week. Beginners' and regular classes are open to all Aikido practitioners that are or become Aikikai members.

== Aikikai school of Aikido ==
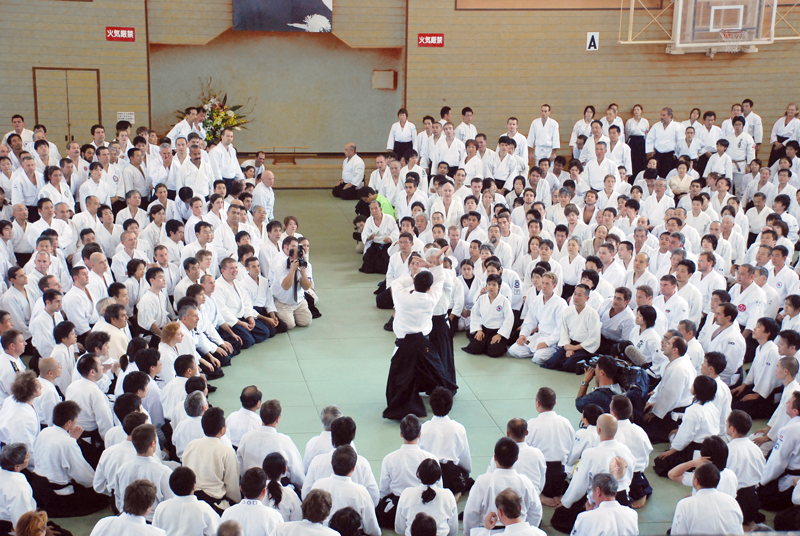
Dōshu demonstrating Aikido to students from around the globe, at the IAF Congress in Tanabe (birth town of Ōsensei)

Within Japan, there are about 1800 other training locations affiliated with the Hombu. These are united under the All-Japan Aikido Federation.

Overseas, there are about 100 foreign aikido organisations recognised by the Hombu. These are ostensibly national aikido organisations that each represent many dojos and many students. The gradings of students in these organisations are certified specifically by the Hombu. (The Hombu has procedures for examinations and recommendations of aikido grades and instructor titles, and ideally this ensures a degree of international consistency and serves to prevent local instructors from boastfully exaggerating their own ranks.) However, regardless of recognition, all foreign aikido groups remain organisationally independent from the Aikikai Foundation.

The students of recognised dojo worldwide are loosely referred to collectively as the Aikikai school of aikido, although this "school" is not an official organisation. Their aikido technique may be referred to as Aikikai style, although this encompasses a wider spectrum of technical styles characteristically than later (and smaller) schools of aikido.

== International Aikido Federation ==
International Aikido Federation original logo

The International Aikido Federation was formed in 1976 to serve as the primary global aikido organisation. It is an umbrella organisation with member organisations from more than 40 nations (for example, the All-Japan Aikido Federation is one member). All members must be recognised by the Hombu, so the IAF exclusively represents the Aikikai. The IAF is a nominally democratic organisation but special roles are given to the Doshu and a council of senior instructors, to safeguard the "technical and moral" integrity of aikido. The IAF currently admits only one member organisation per country and gives each such member equal vote (it was modelled on the UN; it does not necessarily give every Aikikai student equal representation).

== Aikikai style of aikido ==
Aikikai is not one style of aikido but instead, encompasses a diversity of technical styles. This is associated with the broad base of first generation instructors, who each had their own interpretation of the art, and other influences. Nonetheless Aikikai is often described as a style for comparison with separate aikido organisations. Aikikai is described as the most traditional; Aikikai has stayed loyal to the Ueshiba house and is sometimes called Ueshiba Aikido. It has retained many of the aspects which Morihei Ueshiba valued, such as the non-competitive training system (as contrasted with Tomiki's development). Spiritual interpretations are not emphasised compared to in Ki Society.

Morihei Ueshiba's own style evolved significantly over his lifetime. The pre-war aikibudo techniques taught by Morihei Ueshiba were generally closer to aikijujutsu whilst flowing technique was more emphasised as he became older, and this is reflected in the aikido of people who studied at different periods in time.

Seiseki Abe said:

"As far as the Aikido [O-Sensei] practiced in his later years, even young girls, old people and children could do [the techniques]. That is a big difference. I suppose you could say that it was a difference in the severity or the strictness of the training. Before the war, it was severity and strong technique, as opposed to the (kind of) techniques that invigorate our partners as we have now."

Kazuo Chiba has implied that the style of training in Hombu concentrated less on physical rigor because of its demographic:

"A large portion of the membership at Iwama Dojo consisted of local farmers, hard workers who spent all day in the fields. They had thick bones and great physical strength, combined with a peculiar local character known as "Mito kishitsu," a type of manliness close to gallantry. Altogether, it was quite an opposite culture from Hombu Dojo in Tokyo. Because it is in the capital of Japan, Hombu’s membership consists of white-collar workers, intellectuals, businessmen, politicians and university students."

It has been noted by aikido researchers affiliated with other styles that many of the senior teachers at the Aikikai spent little time training under Morihei Ueshiba, and that Kisshomaru Ueshiba and Koichi Tohei (and following Tohei's departure, Kisaburo Osawa) were largely responsible for the Aikikai curriculum. As a result, it has been argued that the teachings of the Aikikai are derived from those of the second Doshu, Kisshomaru, and that the art promulgated by the Aikikai differs from that taught by the founder, Morihei Ueshiba.
