= Nishio style Aikido =

Martial art style

Nishio style Aikido, often simply referred to by Aikido practitioners as Nishio Aikido, is a martial art style created by Shoji Nishio, a prolific Aikido practitioner. His style is characterized as dynamic and effective. Atemis and sword principles are deeply embedded in techniques.

== Philosophy, views ==
=== Style classification ===
While utilizing different underlying core mechanics, Nishio never considered his Aikido to be a different school of Aikido (like Iwama Ryu, Ki Society, Yoshinkan, Shodokan Aikido, etc.) He wanted his approach to be a branch part of Aikikai umbrella. As such, he decided against calling his Aikido style "Nishio-ryu" (but not the same for Iaido).

=== Engagement with oppositions ===
Nishio believed that one of Aikido's core tenets is about acknowledging the other person. Most Aikido techniques offer 3-4 opportunities to strike down an opponent but ultimately choose the least damaging option. Even when throwing, he said, Aikido practitioners should try not to injure the attacker. This type of choice materializes the philosophy of acknowledgment, understanding, acceptance and mutual respect of and for others, even as they are opposition. Aikido's philosophy stands in contrast to other martial arts' goal of overcoming others. Nishio believed that this context helps recreating each technique close to the spirit of Ueshiba.

=== Views on innovation in Aikido ===
Nishio strongly believed that the innovation of Aikido is a requirement that Ueshiba set its practitioners. He also asked practitioners to develop based on their own background. His conclusion based on Ueshiba's words before his death:

Before the Founder passed away thirty-four years ago he told us, “This old man has brought [aikido] this far; all of you must take it from here.” In light of these words, I think it is insufficient—unforgivable, in fact— for us to simply maintain the status quo.

The commitment to this view is reflected in his style numerous technical distinctions as well as a new school of iaido. Nishio is considered as "one of the foremost technical innovators" in Aikido.

== Technical approach ==
=== Stages ===
In Nishio style, there are three major stages for an Aikido technique: tsukuri, kuzushi, waza/kake which roughly means set-up, break balance, technique execution. The clear stage of tsukuri in a technique is unique to Nishio style, as mainstream and other major Aikido schools do not mention it. It is possible that Nishio drew inspiration of these stages from his judo background, as there are similarly named stages. However, the timing and application of these stages in judo are different.

The following image is a simplified sequence of stages in Nishio style Aikido technique. It is not meant to be exhaustive, comprehensive, restrictive nor mandatory. It is meant to make it easier to understand generic action sequencing defined in Nishio style Aikido. Timing are not strictly ordered; there are times stages are not clearly defined nor applied; actions types are not confined to one particular stages. It is possible that the stages may overlap or occur almost simultaneously or even combined (initiated/completed by a single action), adapting to the specific situation and the actions of both practitioner and opponent.

Some examples of deviation from this sequence are: Kuzushi could happen before attacks are initiated; no contact made at all is possible; avoidance of attack is not presented; osae waza (immobilization) applies where applicable; locks could be applied in other stage than osae waza. A well-structured simplified explanation in no way, shape or form, overrides the fluidity, practicality of Aikido. This timeline should be treated as foundational rather than authoritative. This should be used to improve the fluency, effectiveness, may be even diversity of one's Aikido.

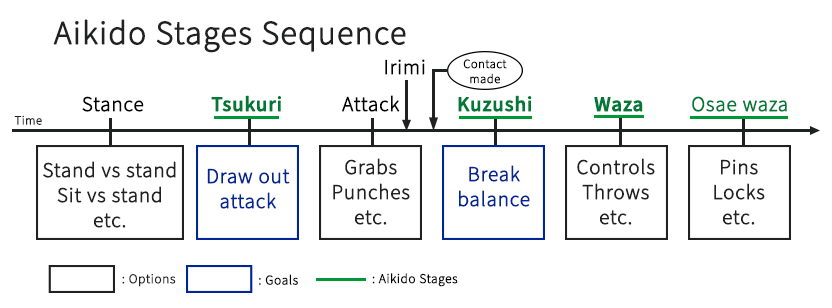
Brief visualization of Aikido technique stages by time.

=== Stance ===
Nishio believed that natural stance (shizentai) is the way to face an opponent, adversary, or training partner. It becomes a physical manifestation of humanity in Aikido. It is said that in his final years, Ueshiba, the founder of Aikido, also disliked kamae (roughly means preparation stance before the fight). In videos of Ueshiba's demonstrations, he never took kamae stand at all.

In Nishio's style, the stance takes form of hand, hip straight down naturally. Both feet should also be straight with one slightly higher than the other. This feet position let the practitioner face his opposition directly and acknowledge him (a core tenet in Nishio-style). This stance is the same when practitioner use a sword or a jo (a wooden stick). With the sword, the tip of the sword lie down near front foot in front of the holder. With the jo, the direction of the jo intersect with opposition's eyes.

Physically, these form a "no stance" stance; however, practitioner should already taking a mental stance of acceptance, awareness, preparation. The hand is then offered to the opposition. Entering technique starts at the moment of contact. The offering of the hand is a form of tsukuri (set-up).

In comparison, most other Aikido styles' stance have one hand or both hands extended forward, usually with extended fingers. Visually, this stance style leans toward preparation for fight rather than neutralization.

=== Tsukuri ===
In the context of budo, tsukuri roughly translates to "set-up." It refers to a situation created in a way that can easily convert into advantageous conditions or positioning over opposition in the next immediate one or two actions. In Nishio teaching, to create tsukuri, practitioners need to take the initiative to elicit opponent's action. Furthermore, to have effective tsukuri, one must consider how to set up the situation in a way that best matches their own body and the intended technique.

Due to its adaptive nature, tsukuri could take many forms. For instance, in empty-handed techniques, tsukuri usually involving offering a hand or an easy-to-attack body part. In weapon techniques, tsukuri takes form of lowering or moving the weapon out of the combat line. Another approach is to adopt natural stance - shizentai, not raising the sword to kamae (defensive) position at all, leaving the body completely open.

Tsukuri is a dynamic concept, not specifically bound to a single timing. Tsukuri could also refer to the position after irimi and contact made, preparing for kuzushi (breaking balance).

=== Irimi ===
In budo, irimi is essentially the movement to obtain an opponent's "dead angle." This refers to a strategic position offering effective strike and control opportunities while it is significantly harder/slower for the opposition to do so. In Nishio's style, irimi is taken as a half-step instead of a one-step in other Aikido schools. By taking half-step instead of full step, practitioner stays connected to the opposition thereby maintaining effective control of the situation. According to Nishio, this half-step plays a very critical role in determining the outcome of a conflict, even before the first contact.

In front-facing position, the step is to the right and slightly forward, creating a direction of about 30 degree compare to the shoulder's initial position. In terms of timing, irimi generally happens after the attack initiation but before attack completion. In terms of finishing position after irimi, a practitioner should be able to strike the opposition while stay out of range of or well-prepared for potential strikes or kicks.

=== Kuzushi ===
Kuzushi aims to disrupt the opponent's balance. In Nishio style, kuzushi can be as subtle and simple as turning the wrist when grabbed. The ease of application of kuzushi could be significantly better with good tsukuri and exploitation of it. The effectiveness of kuzushi also depends greatly on the timing and technique of practitioner. In Nishio style, the execution of kuzushi almost always involves atemi.

Most of the time, kuzushi happens after contact is made, as contact is usually needed to move opposition. However, in Nishio style Aikido, a well-directed and well-timed atemi could also be used for unbalancing opposition, in which case would happen before physical contact. The rhythm of kuzushi actions are typically determined by the type of atemi practitioner intend to meet opposition with. It is possible that irimi and kuzushi occur simultaneously as they mostly utilize different parts of the body.

=== Waza/Kake ===
Waza is the stage where the supposed actual Aikido technique is performed. This could involve a throw, pin, or other control technique. The success of waza is heavily dependent on the effectiveness of the preceding tsukuri and kuzushi stages. The principles of execution of waza/kake in Nishio style are strongly linked to the principles of atemi (in term of timing and rhythm) and sword techniques (in term of direction and purpose). While proper execution is important, Nishio believed that the ability of getting into the position to performing techniques is sometimes far more valuable than the lock technique itself from bujustsu perspective.

=== Atemi ===
In mainstream Aikido styles, atemi are demonstrated infrequently, and have fallen into disuse. In Nishio's style, atemis are everywhere and numerous (his teaching lists at least ten different hand strikes, and five elbow strikes). Almost all Aikido techniques demonstrated by Nishio have multiple atemis at the beginning and during techniques.

Aikido is forty percent throwing and sixty percent pinning. [...] Further, in all of the techniques there is atemi. [...] In the aikido I learned (and that I now teach), we do throws and pins with the rhythm and feeling of atemi. Shoij Nishio

Atemis in Aikido serve primarily to momentarily divert the opponent's attention and disrupt their posture and balance. While the goal of atemi is not to end a conflict with a single powerful blow, in Nishio style, it is meant to be an effective blow. Nishio advocates for proper practice and application of atemi techniques like utilizing suitably effective strike types to target vital points generally difficult to reinforce.

While disruption and deterrent aspect of atemis are common in most Aikido style/school, in Nishio style they also determine the rhythm and timing of techniques. In the style, each movement initiates usually coincide with a possible atemi. The moment of taking control of a body part of opposition is most likely the same moment that an atemi would have landed.

=== Hand movement ===
Another uniqueness of his style compared to other Aikido styles is the deep integration of the sword principles into Aikido techniques. In Nishio's style, after contact, hand movements imitate the movement of the sword in both hand's shape and trajectory. The leading hand usually is open, straight with fingers close together (forming shape very similar to shuto or knife-hand but without folding thumb). Since the hand is open, not grabbing the opposition, it is believed to be open to the possibility of performing different atemis. Grabbing the opposition's hand only happen near the finish of technique or sometimes even not at all. This timing of grabbing is significantly different from other Aikido styles where grabbing happen almost immediately after contact most of the time.

The path and direction of the hand is the same as a sword cutting space with the side has little finger leads the movement. In Nishio's style, finishing of shihonage is described as the hand "cutting downward" rather than a throw.

=== Koshinage - hip throws ===
The "hip throw" which is now commonly performed during promotion examinations at Aikikai dojos, was not a well-known technique at first. Aikido's throwing repertoire was limited to iriminage, shihonage, and kotegaeshi. Koshiwaza was independently researched and developed by Nishio (utilizing his judo background) and Hiroshio Kuroiwa when they were young instructors at the headquarters, and it is said to have spread to other Aikido practitioners.

=== Weapons ===
==== Underlying principles ====
In Nishio's style, all techniques can be performed with the wooden sword bokken, wooden stick jō in hand as well as without weapons.

I have experience in karate and judo, and feel the way of the sword is central, so I reflect empty-hand techniques and throws in my sword and jo movements. O-sensei said, "If your hands hold a sword, then aikido is a sword; if your hands hold a jo, then aikido is a jo." - Shoji Nishio

In weapon training, he believes, practitioners should try to be "on the edge". That means avoid being struck, deliver an effective final strike and stop within hair's breadth of contact.

The usage of bokken in Aikido is different from doing Iaido as it is not in kata form but in Aikido form.

==== Sword techniques: The Concept of Misogi no Ken ====
===== Purpose =====
Nishio believed the purpose of the Aikido sword was to purify, as he called it the "sword of purification".

The sword in Aikido does not cut the opponent. Rather, it is a tool to control the attack, even before its occurrence. The sword is used to redirect opponent's energy, voiding the need of physical strike. This approach of usage emphasizes the focus on control, the removal of conflict and unnecessary of damaging others. Thereby using in this way, it will forge the sword's controller out of mental "impurities" (the desire to hurt and creation of conflict).

The sword techniques in Aikido aim to find unified direction, not cutting down opponent. Therefore it's a tool to guide both persons toward new understanding and mutual respect. This aspect shows the "purification" of intention of the opposition.

The swords also help practitioners understand the core physical mechanics of empty-handed Aikido techniques. This view of utility emphasizes striving for perfection of bodily movements, hence "purifying".

===== Characteristic =====
The sword of Aikido makes no sound. - Shoji Nishio

Described as otonashi, or "silent," Nishio's sword work relies on minimal blade contact. His sword techniques anticipate and exploit gaps in opponent's attacks, turning defense into offense with precise, flowing movements. This approach is very different from Morihito Saito's style, where the majority of controls are achieved through impact with the other sword, resulting in significant clashing of the swords heard throughout.

== Spread and influences ==
Nishio's impact on Aikido went beyond the Japanese border and transcended techniques. The regions teaching Nishio-style Aikido includes Central and Northern Europe, the United States, Mexico, France and Germany as well as Vietnam, Iran, Australia.

=== Notable students ===
Nishio cultivated a dedicated following in many countries. Some notable practitioners of his style includes:

| Name | Aikido Ranking | Other dan ranking | Practice country |
|---|---|---|---|
| Koji Yoshida | 7th Dan | 6th Renshi in Musoshinden-ryu Iaido, 7th in Nishio-ryu Toho Iaido | Japan |
| Ichiro Shishiya | 7th Dan | 5th Dan Aikido Toho Iai | Japan |
| Kunio Yoshimoto | 7th Dan | 5th Dan Iaido | |
| Paul Muller | 7th Dan | 5th Dan Aikido Toho Iai | France |
| Philip Greenwood | 6th Dan | 5th Dan Iaido | USA |
