= List of practice weapons =

This list of practice weapons, is of weapons specifically designed for practice in different martial arts from around the world. Unlike those in the list of martial arts weapons article, many of which are designed to be effective weapons, generally those listed here are blunted or otherwise designed for safe regular practice and training.

== Technique ==
- Bokken (Japanese wooden swords, also known as bokuto)
- Iaitō (Practice weapon used in Iaido)
- Taijijian (Demonstration version of the Jian, Chinese straight sword, for use in tai chi)
- Dussack (European curved, single edged practice sword)
- Waster (Wooden European sword simulator)
- Rubber duck (American mockup of a firearm used in training, such as Marine Corps Martial Arts Program)

== Sparring ==
- Shinai (Japanese Katana-like sword made of Bamboo strips, used in Kendo)
- Pugil stick (Heavily padded pole-like weapon)
- Foil (European fencing weapon)
- Federschwert (Steel sparring sword used in European martial arts)
- Foam Weapons, Boffers (Foam Weapons used in live action role playing, SCA, and the like)

== Strength ==
- Suburitō (Japanese wooden sword, longer and heavier than a bokken)
- Tanren bō (Japanese blunt, wooden, suburito-like bat used in Aikido)
- Gada (Indian metal mace, a heavy metal spherical head mounted on a shaft used in Pehlwani)

== See also ==
- List of martial arts weapons
- Toy gun
