= List of Shigurui chapters =

Shigurui is a manga series written and illustrated by Takayuki Yamaguchi.

== Volume list ==
No.	Japanese release date	Japanese ISBN
1	January 22, 2004	4-253-23043-1
1. The Tournament in Sunpu Castle; 2. Rules for the contest between representatives of two different schools; 3. The Tiger and the Two Dragons; 4. The Sticky Bean; 5. A Visit in the Night
2	June 24, 2004	4-253-23044-X
6. Kamaitachi; 7. Child Song; 8. Beast; 9. Puppets; 10. Hairpin
3	January 1, 2005	4-253-23045-8
11.Passing on the secret art.; 12. Instant; 13. Bonfire; 14. Wrath; 15. Birth Cry
4	June 5, 2005	4-253-23046-6
16. Fangs; 17. Face; 18. Cicada's cry; 19. Blind man; 20. Tiger's cub
5	November 19, 2005	4-253-23047-4
21. The Angel of Tokogawa; 22. Futawa; 23. Kengyou's Estate; 24. Taunting; 25. Binding Agreement; 26.Moonlight
6	April 20, 2006	4-253-23048-2
27. Firelock; 28. Transformation; 29. Blind Dragon; 30. Nagare Boshi; 31. Death Flash
7	October 20, 2006	4-253-23049-0
32. Mumyou Sakanagare; 33. Bully; 34. Bamboo Spear; 35. Nemesis; 36. Fellow Student; 37. Sealed Art
8	March 20, 2007	978-4-253-23218-0
38. Vengeance; 39. Execution Ground; 40. Thundering of the Earth; 41. Doppelganger; 42. A Pair of Eyes
9	August 21, 2007	978-4-253-23219-7
43. Arm; 44. Bull Demon; 45. Red Cord; 46. Asura; 47. Newborn
10	February 20, 2008	978-4-253-23220-3
48. Free of Avidya; 49. Hallucination; 50. The Promised Cherry Tree; 51. One Eye; 52. Wail of the Wraith; 53. Bonds
11	August 20, 2008	978-4-253-23221-0
54. Decree; 55. Helmet; 56. Battle; 57. Scab; 58. Great Serpent; 59. Phantom Limb
12	March 19, 2009	978-4-253-23222-7
60. Couple; 61. Rain Shower; 62. Black Hair; 63. Clairvoyance; 64. Disappearance; 65. The Dead
13	September 18, 2009	978-4-253-23223-4
66. The Great Palace; 67. Dungeon; 68. Ape; 69. Demon With a Spear; 70. Changing Clothes; 71. Tiger Killing
14	March 19, 2010	978-4-253-23224-1
72. Makiwara; 73. Avatar; 74. Ichinoji; 75. Love; 76. One-Eyed Dragon; 77. Audience
15	October 20, 2010	978-4-253-23225-8
78. Instant; 79. Shizakura; 80. Dragon Gate; 81. Before the Jaws of Death; 82. White Blade; 83. Tsubazemari; 84. Pure Crimson
