= Aikido techniques =

Techniques of the Japanese martial art

Aikido techniques are frequently referred to as waza 技 (which is Japanese for technique, art or skill). Aikido training is based primarily on two partners practicing pre-arranged forms (kata) rather than freestyle practice. The basic pattern is for the receiver of the technique (uke) to initiate an attack against the person who applies the technique—the 取り tori, or shite 仕手, (depending on aikido style) also referred to as 投げ nage (when applying a throwing technique), who neutralises this attack with an aikido technique.

Both halves of the technique, that of uke and that of tori, are considered essential to aikido training. Both are studying aikido principles of blending and adaptation. Tori learns to blend with and control attacking energy, while uke learns to become calm and flexible in the disadvantageous, off-balance positions in which tori places him. This "receiving" of the technique is called ukemi. Uke continuously seeks to regain balance and cover vulnerabilities (e.g., an exposed side), while tori uses position and timing to keep uke off-balance and vulnerable. In more advanced training, uke may apply reversal techniques (返し技, kaeshi-waza) to regain balance and pin or throw tori.

Ukemi (受身) refers to the act of receiving a technique. Good ukemi involves attention to the technique, the partner and the immediate environment - it is an active rather than a passive "receiving" of Aikido. The fall itself is part of Aikido, and is a way for the practitioner to receive, safely, what would otherwise be a devastating strike or throw (or joint lock control) and return to a standing position in one fluid movement. The person throwing (or applying other technique) must take into account the ukemi ability of his partner, as well as the physical space: walls, weapons (wooden tantō, bokken, jō) on the tatami, and the aikido practitioners nearby.

Uke must attack with a strength and speed appropriate to the skill level of the tori; in the case of beginners, this means an attack of far less severity than would be encountered in a real-life self-defense situation.

== Training techniques ==
- Boat-rowing exercise (船漕運動, Funakogi undō) / Rowing the boat (取り船, torifune) teaches movement from the hip rather than relying on muscle strength of the arms
- First teaching exercise (一教運動, Ikkyo undō) trains students to enter with both arms forward in the tegatana (手刀) position.
- Body change (体の変更, Tai no henko) altering the direction of an incoming attack
- Seated breathing method (座技呼吸法, Suwariwaza kokyūhō) / Breathing action (呼吸動作, Kokyūdōsa) / Breathing belly method (呼吸丹田方, Kokyūtandenhō) breathing is important in the execution of all aikido techniques. Here "breathing" has an additional meaning of "match with" or "accord," as the efforts of tori must agree with the direction and strength with which his wrists are held by uke.

== Initial attacks ==
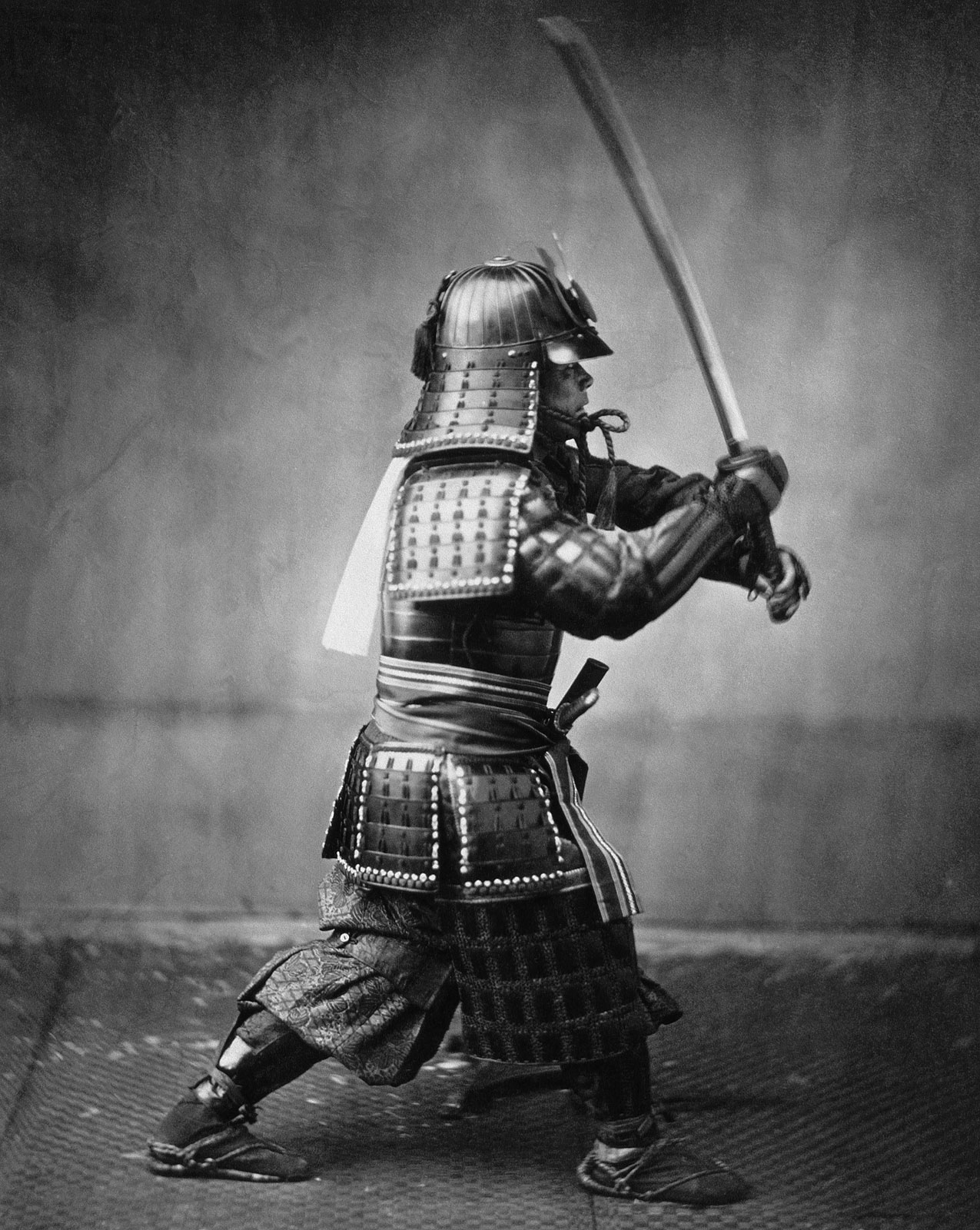
Most aikido strikes resemble attacks with a sword

Aikido techniques are usually a defense against an attack; therefore, to practice aikido with their partner, students must learn to deliver various types of attacks. Although attacks are not studied as thoroughly as in striking-based disciplines such as karate or boxing, "honest" or "sincere" attacks (a strong strike or an immobilizing grab) are needed to study correct and effective application of technique.

Many of the strikes (打ち, uchi) of aikido are often said to resemble cuts from a sword or other grasped object, which indicates its origins in techniques intended for armed combat. Other techniques, which appear to explicitly be punches (tsuki), are also practiced as thrusts with a knife or sword. Kicks are generally reserved for upper-level variations; reasons cited include that falls from kicks are especially dangerous, and that kicks (high kicks in particular) were uncommon during the types of combat prevalent in feudal Japan. Some basic strikes include:

- Front-of-the-head strike (正面打ち, shōmen'uchi) a vertical knifehand strike to the head. In training, this is usually directed at the forehead or the crown for safety, but more dangerous versions of this attack target the bridge of the nose and the maxillary sinus.
- Side-of-the-head strike (横面打ち, yokomen'uchi) a diagonal knifehand strike to the side of the head or neck.
- Chest thrust (胸突き, mune-tsuki) a punch to the torso. Specific targets include the chest, abdomen, and solar plexus. Same as "middle-level thrust" (中段突き, chūdan-tsuki), and "direct thrust" (直突き, choku-tsuki).
- Face thrust (顔面突き, ganmen-tsuki) a punch to the face. Same as "upper-level thrust" (上段突き, jōdan-tsuki).
- Sword-taking (太刀取り, tachitori) Being attacked with a sword or bokken, usually reserved for upper level practitioners.
- Knife-taking (短刀取り, tantōtori) Being attacked with a tantō, usually a wooden one.
- Staff-taking (杖取り, jōtori) Being attacked with a jō . Being attacked by any wooden staff is called bōtori (棒取り) or tsuetori (杖取り)

Beginners in particular often practice techniques from grabs, both because they are safer and because it is easier to feel the energy and lines of force of a hold than a strike. Some grabs are historically derived from being held while trying to draw a weapon; a technique could then be used to free oneself and immobilize or strike the attacker who is grabbing the defender.

- Single-hand grab (片手取り, katate-dori) one hand grabs one wrist.
- Both-hands grab (諸手取り, morote-dori) both hands grab one wrist. Same as "single hand double-handed grab" (片手両手取り, katateryōte-dori)
- Both-hands grab (両手取り, ryōte-dori) both hands grab both wrists. Same as "double single-handed grab" (両片手取り, ryōkatate-dori).
- Shoulder grab (肩取り, kata-dori) a shoulder grab. "Both-shoulders-grab" is ryōkata-dori (両肩取り). It is sometimes combined with an overhead strike as Shoulder grab face strike (肩取り面打ち, kata-dori men-uchi).
- Chest grab (胸取り, mune-dori or muna-dori) grabbing the (clothing of the) chest. Same as "collar grab" (襟取り, eri-dori).
- Rear chokehold (後ろ首絞め, ushiro kubishime)
- Rear both shoulders grab (後ろ両肩取り, ushiro ryokatatori)
- Rear both wrists grab (後ろ手首取り, ushiro tekubitori)

== Techniques ==
Diagram of ikkyō, or "first technique". Yonkyō has a similar mechanism of action, although the upper hand grips the forearm rather than the elbow.

When all attacks are considered, aikido has over 10,000 nameable techniques. Many aikido techniques derive from Daitō-ryū Aiki-jūjutsu, but some others were invented by Morihei Ueshiba. The precise terminology for some may vary between organizations and styles; what follows are the terms used by the Aikikai Foundation. (Note that despite the names of the first five techniques listed, they are not universally taught in numeric order.) Several techniques (e.g. the "drop" throws) are also shared with judo, which can be considered a "cousin" of aikido due to their shared jujutsu background.

Aikido techniques can be broadly classified into two groups, immobilizing techniques (固め技, katame waza) and throwing techniques (投げ技, nage waza).

=== Immobilizing techniques ===
- First teaching (一教, ikkyō), a control using one hand on the elbow and one hand near the wrist which leverages uke to the ground (also called 腕押さえ, ude osae, "arm pin"). This grip also applies pressure into the ulnar nerve at the wrist.
- Second teaching (二教, nikyō), a pronating wristlock (小手回し, kote mawashi, "forearm turn") that torques the arm and applies painful nerve pressure. There is an adductive wristlock or Z-lock in ura version.
- Third teaching (三教, sankyō), a rotational wristlock (小手捻り, kote hineri, "forearm twist") that directs upward-spiraling tension throughout the arm, elbow and shoulder.
- Fourth teaching (四教, yonkyō), a shoulder control similar to ikkyō, but with both hands gripping the forearm (also called 小手押さえ, kote osae, "forearm pin"). The knuckles (from the palm side) are applied to the recipient's radial nerve against the periosteum of the forearm bone.
- Fifth teaching (五教, gokyō), visually similar to ikkyō, but with an inverted grip of the wrist, medial rotation of the arm and shoulder, and downward pressure on the elbow (also called 腕伸ばし, ude nobashi). Common in knife and other weapon take-aways.
- Sixth teaching (六教, rokkyō), also called elbow arm-barring pin (肘極め押さえ, hiji kime osae).
- Arm-spraining second teaching (腕拉ぎ二教, ude hishigi nikyō), an elbow lock generally used for knife thrusts or straight punches.
- Arm entanglement (腕絡み, ude-garami), or rotary pin (回転抑え, kaiten osae). Note that the name of this technique varies with organizations, and that ude-garami may also refer to a different technique altogether (see below, arm entanglement throw).
- Elbow techniques (肘技, hiji waza), a class of techniques which involve immobilizing the elbow through locks.
- Neck chokes (首締め, kubi-shime), a variety of techniques that involve applying chokes.

==== Yoshinkan terminology ====
The Yoshinkan school retains these Daitō-ryū Aiki-jūjutsu terms for the "first" through "fourth" techniques:

1. 一ケ条 Ikkajo
2. 二ケ条 Nikajo
3. 三ケ条 Sankajo
4. 四ケ条 Yonkajo

=== Throwing techniques ===
- Breath method (呼吸法, kokyū-hō). From a standing position where the tori and uke are side-by-side, the tori throws the uke backward with a raised arm cutting backwards and downwards. This technique is also sometimes referred to as the lateral entering throw (側面入身投げ, sokumen irimi-nage), or categorized as a type of breath throw (see below, slanted breath throw).
- Four-direction throw (四方投げ, shihō-nage). The hand is folded back past the shoulder, locking the shoulder joint.
- Forearm return (小手返し, kote-gaeshi), a supinating wristlock-throw that stretches the extensor digitorum. As this technique contains both locking and throwing elements, it is sometimes classified under a hybrid category of throwing-immobilizing combination techniques (投げ固め技, nage-katame-waza).
- Entering throw (入身投げ, irimi-nage), throws in which tori moves through the space occupied by uke. The classic form superficially resembles a "clothesline" technique.
- Heaven-and-earth throw (天地投げ, tenchi-nage) beginning with ryōte-dori; moving forward, tori sweeps one hand low ("earth") and the other high ("heaven"), which unbalances uke so that he or she easily topples over.
- Hip throw (腰投げ, koshi-nage) aikido's version of the hip throw. Tori drops his or her hips lower than those of uke, then flips uke over the resultant fulcrum.
- Figure-ten throw (十字投げ, jūji-nage) or figure-ten entanglement (十字絡み, jūji-garami) a throw that locks the arms against each other (The kanji for "10" is a cross-shape: 十).
- Rotary throw (回転投げ, kaiten-nage) tori sweeps the arm back until it locks the shoulder joint, then uses forward pressure to throw.
- Corner drop (隅落とし, Sumi otoshi), sometimes also considered a type of breath throw.
- Arm extension throw (腕極め投げ, udekime-nage), from behind, the tori extends the uke's arm slightly downwards and places the other arm outstretched under the uke's upper arm, then moves the whole body forward. Also alternatively termed the weighing scales throw (天秤投げ, tenbin-nage), referring to the tori's use of an outstretched arm as a fulcrum. Can also be considered a form of breath throw.
- Blending drop (合気落とし, aiki-otoshi), where the tori grabs both of the uke's knees and lifts them up, throwing the uke backward.
- Arm entanglement throw (腕絡み投げ, ude-garami-nage). Like the forearm return, this technique contains both throwing and locking elements, and may be considered to be a throwing-immobilizing combination technique (投げ固め技, nage-katame-waza). Note that the name ude-garami is sometimes used by different schools to refer to a different immobilisation technique (see above, arm entanglement).

==== Breath throws ====
Breath throw (呼吸投げ, kokyū-nage) refers to a class of techniques that centre on the union of breathing and throw, that generally do not end in joint locks like the immobilising techniques. The names of specific techniques may vary across organizations and dojos, but they begin with uke coming from the rear and blocking one or both tori's wrists; at their heart there are the two parts of breathing: inspiration and at the same time an elbow-arm ascending arc which uke must follow, expiration(and a lateral displacement) with the arc now descending, sending uke in the resulting vacuum. Different types of kokyū-nage may include:

- Slanted breath throw (斜め呼吸投げ, naname kokyū-nage), where the tori throws the uke backwards. This technique is sometimes simply referred to as the main kokyū-nage technique, or separately as the breath method, kokyū-hō (see above, under throwing techniques). Alternative terminology also include lateral entering throw (側面入身投げ, sokumen irimi-nage) (particularly in Yoshinkan), and rear throw (後ろ投げ, ushiro-nage).
- Forward throw (前方投げ, zenpō-nage). Against an opposite stance single-hand grab, the throw can be referred to by the opening movement tenkan tsugiashi (転換継ぎ足), which is a rear pivot followed by a forward step.
- Rotary breath throw (回転呼吸投げ, kaiten kokyū-nage). The technique begins similar to that of a regular rotary throw (kaiten-nage), but then transitions into a forward throw. Just like the rotary throw, two variations of rotary breath throws exist—inner (内, uchi) and outer (外, soto). Against an opposite stance single-hand grab, these two variations can be named by their opening movements as irimi kaiten (入身回転) and irimi tenkan (入身転換) breath throws respectively.
- Variations on immobilizing techniques
  - First teaching throw (一教投げ, ikkyō-nage). This throw begins as if the tori were performing a regular ikkyō technique, using both arms raised to connect with the uke's attack. But instead of going into the arm pin, the tori pushes the uke backward instead.
  - First teaching changing (or variation) technique (一教変化技, ikkyō henka-waza). Similar to the first teaching throw, but instead of throwing the uke backward, the tori transitions into a drop technique by cutting down or controlling the uke's attacking arm, as seen in the cutting (kiri-otoshi) or floating drops (uki-otoshi). This results in throwing the uke forward.
  - Third teaching throw (三教投げ, sankyō-nage). The tori performs the third teaching technique until the first lock, where the uke's elbow is pointing skyward, and then throws the uke forward.
- Drops (落とし, otoshi)
  - Corner drop (隅落とし, sumi-otoshi)
  - Cutting drop (切り落とし, kiri-otoshi)
  - Rear cutting drop (後ろ切り落とし, ushiro kiri-otoshi)
  - Floating drop (浮き落とし, uki-otoshi)
  - Rolling-up drop (巻き落とし, maki-otoshi)
  - Shoulder-pulling drop (肩引き落とし, kata hiki-otoshi)
  - Striking drop (すり落とし, suri-otoshi)
  - Shoulder drop (背負い落とし, Seoi otoshi)
  - Body drop (体落とし, Tai otoshi)
  - Shoulder wheel (肩車, Kata guruma)
- Blending throw (合気投げ, aiki-nage), where the tori drops to the floor and causes the uke to roll forward and over the tori's back.
- Hip breath throws
  - Flicking hip (はじき腰, hajiki goshi)
  - Shoulder-pulling flicking hip (肩引きはじき腰, kata hiki hajiki goshi)
  - Pulling hip (釣り腰, tsuri goshi)
  - Lifting-pull hip (釣り込み腰, tsurikomi goshi)
  - Large hip (大腰, O goshi)
  - Forearm twist hip throw (小手捻り腰投げ, kote-hineri koshi-nage)

== Implementations ==
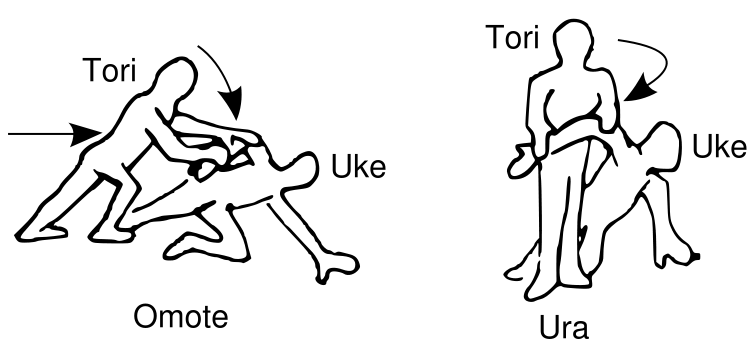
Diagram showing two versions of the ikkyō technique: one moving forward (the omote version) and one moving backward (the ura version). See text for more details.

Aikido makes use of body movement (tai sabaki) to blend with uke. For example, an "entering" (irimi) technique consists of movements inward towards uke, while a "turning" (転換, tenkan) technique uses a pivoting motion. Additionally, an "inside" (内, uchi) technique takes place in front of uke, whereas an "outside" (外, soto) technique takes place to his side; a "front" (表, omote) technique is applied with motion to the front of uke, and a "rear" (裏, ura) version is applied with motion towards the rear of uke, usually by incorporating a turning or pivoting motion. Finally, most techniques can be performed while in a seated posture (seiza). Techniques where both uke and tori are sitting are called suwari-waza, and techniques performed with uke standing and tori sitting are called hanmi handachi.

Thus, from fewer than twenty basic techniques, there are thousands of possible implementations. For instance, ikkyō can be applied to an opponent moving forward with a strike (perhaps with an ura type of movement to redirect the incoming force), or to an opponent who has already struck and is now moving back to reestablish distance (perhaps an omote-waza version). Specific aikido kata are typically referred to with the formula "attack-technique(-modifier)". For instance, katate-dori ikkyō refers to any ikkyō technique executed when uke is holding one wrist. This could be further specified as katate-dori ikkyō omote, referring to any forward-moving ikkyō technique from that grab.

Atemi (当て身) are strikes (or feints) employed during an aikido technique. Some view atemi as attacks against "vital points" meant to cause damage in and of themselves. For instance, Gōzō Shioda described using atemi in a brawl to quickly down a gang's leader. Others consider atemi, especially to the face, to be methods of distraction meant to enable other techniques. A strike, whether or not it is blocked, can startle the target and break his or her concentration. The target may also become unbalanced in attempting to avoid the blow, for example by jerking the head back, which may allow for an easier throw. Many sayings about atemi are attributed to Morihei Ueshiba, who considered them an essential element of technique.

== See also ==
- List of judo techniques
- List of karate terms
- Jujutsu techniques
