= Mycena fonticola =

Scientific classification
- Kingdom: Fungi
- Division: Basidiomycota
- Class: Agaricomycetes
- Order: Agaricales
- Family: Mycenaceae
- Genus: Mycena
- Species: M. fonticola

Binomial name
- Mycena fonticola Har.Takah. (2007)
- M. fonticola is known only from Kanagawa prefecture in central Honshu, Japan

Species of fungus

Mycena fonticola Mycological characteristics
- Gills on hymenium
- Cap is conical
- Hymenium is adnexed
- Stipe is bare
- Spore print is white
- Ecology is saprotrophic
- Edibility is unknown

Mycena fonticola is a species of fungus in the family Mycenaceae. First reported in 2007, it is known only from central Honshu, in Japan, where it grows on dead leaves and twigs in low-elevation forests dominated by oak trees. The fruit body of the fungus has a smooth, violet-brown cap up to 2.5 cm (1.0 in) in diameter, and a slender stem up to 10 cm (3.9 in) long. Distinguishing microscopic characteristics of the mushroom include the relatively large, distinctly amyloid spores (turning blue to black when stained with Melzer's reagent), the smooth, spindle-shaped cheilocystidia (cystidia on the gill edge), the absence of pleurocystidia (cystidia on the gill face), the diverticulate hyphae of the cap cuticle, and the absence of clamp connections.

== Taxonomy, naming, and classification ==
The fungus was first collected by Japanese mycologist Haruki Takahashi in 1999, and described as a new species along with seven other Japanese Mycenas in a 2007 publication. The mushroom's Japanese name is Izumino-ashinagatake (イズミノアシナガタケ). The specific epithet fonticola is derived from Latin, and means "dweller in fountain".

According to Takahashi, various macro- and microscopic features suggest that this species is best classified in the section Fragilipedes (Fr.) Quél., as defined by the Dutch Mycena specialist Maas Geesteranus.

== Description ==
The cap is 1 to 2.5 cm (0.4 to 1.0 in) in diameter, and ranges in shape from conical to convex to bell-shaped. The surface has radially arranged shallow grooves extending almost to the center of the cap. The cap surface is somewhat hygrophanous (changing color as it loses or absorbs water), dry, and smooth. It is colored violet-brown when young, then becomes somewhat paler from the margin. The white flesh is up to 1 mm thick, and lacks any distinctive odor or taste. The stem is long and slender compared to the size of the cap, typically 7 to 10 cm (2.8 to 3.9 in) tall by 1 to 2.5 mm (0.04 to 0.10 in) thick, cylindrical, slightly enlarged at the base, and hollow. It is grayish-brown to violet-brown at the top, gradually becoming violet-brown on the lower portion. The stem surface is initially pruinose (appearing to be covered with a fine whitish powder), but becomes smooth in age. The stem base bears large, bristle-like coarse white hairs. The gills are adnexed (narrowly attached to the stem), with between 23 and 27 reaching the stem. The gills are up to 2.5 mm (0.1 in) broad, thin, and have a whitish or with a grayish hue; the gills edges are the same color as the gill faces.

=== Microscopic characteristics ===
The spores are ellipsoid, smooth, colorless, distinctly amyloid (absorbing iodine stain from Melzer's reagent), thin-walled, and measure 11.5–14 by 6–8 μm. The spore-bearing cells, the basidia, are 17–28 by 6–8 μm, club-shaped, and four-spored. The basidioles (immature or aborted basidia) are club-shaped. The cheilocystidia (cystidia found on the gills edges) are 32–39 by 5–12 μm, abundant, spindle-shaped to roughly club-shaped, often apically broadly rounded, smooth, colorless, and thin-walled. They form a sterile gill edge. Pleurocystidia (cystidia on the gill faces) are absent in this species. The hymenophoral tissue (tissue of the hymenium-bearing structure) is made of thin-walled hyphae that are 7–15 μm wide, cylindrical, smooth, colorless, and dextrinoid (staining reddish to reddish-brown in Melzer's reagent). The cap cuticle is made of parallel, bent-over hyphae that are 2–5 μm wide, cylindrical, and densely covered with warty or finger-like thin-walled diverticulae that are colorless or contain cytoplasmic brownish pigment. The layer of hyphae underlying the cap cuticle are parallel, colorless or with cytoplasmic brownish pigment, dextrinoid, and have short and inflated cells measuring up to 30 μm wide. The stem cuticle is made of parallel, bent-over hyphae that are 3–5 μm wide, and cylindrical. These hyphae are covered with scattered, thin-walled warty or finger-like diverticulae that can be either colorless, or contain brownish pigment in the cytoplasm. The flesh of the stem is made of longitudinally running, cylindrical hyphae that are 5–17 μm wide, smooth, colorless, and dextrinoid. Clamp connections are absent in all tissues of this species.

=== Similar species ===
Mycena mustea is another similar Mycena that was discovered and reported concurrently with M. fonticola; it differs in forming a pale grayish purple cap with a low and broad umbo. Microscopically, it has club-shaped cheilocystidia with several apical short finger-like outgrowths, and nondiverticulate hyphae in the stem cuticle.

== Habitat and distribution ==
Mycena fonticola is known only from Kanagawa, Japan. Fruit bodies are found solitary or scattered, on dead leaves and twigs in low-elevation forests dominated by the oak species Quercus myrsinaefolia and Q. serrata.
