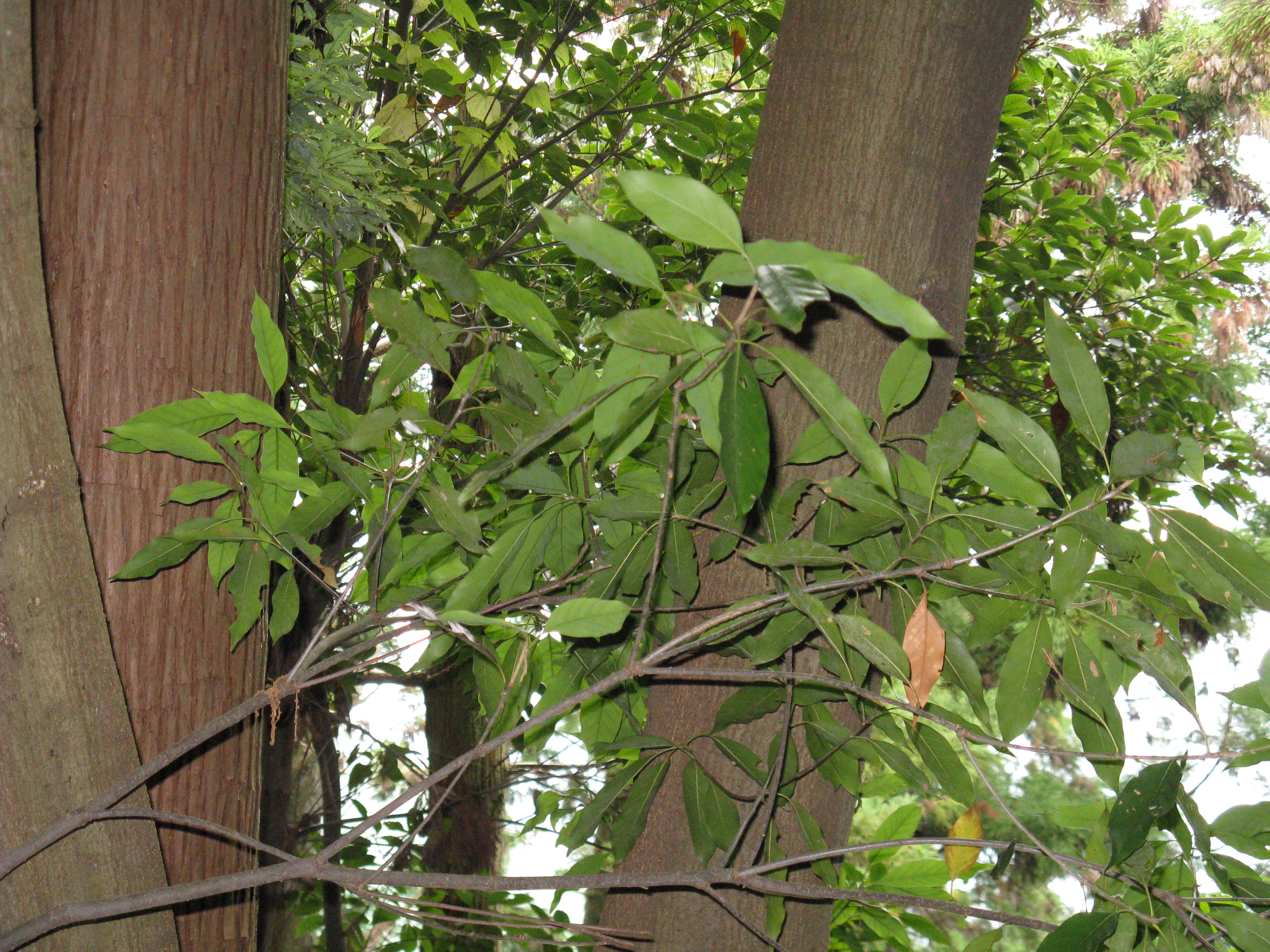

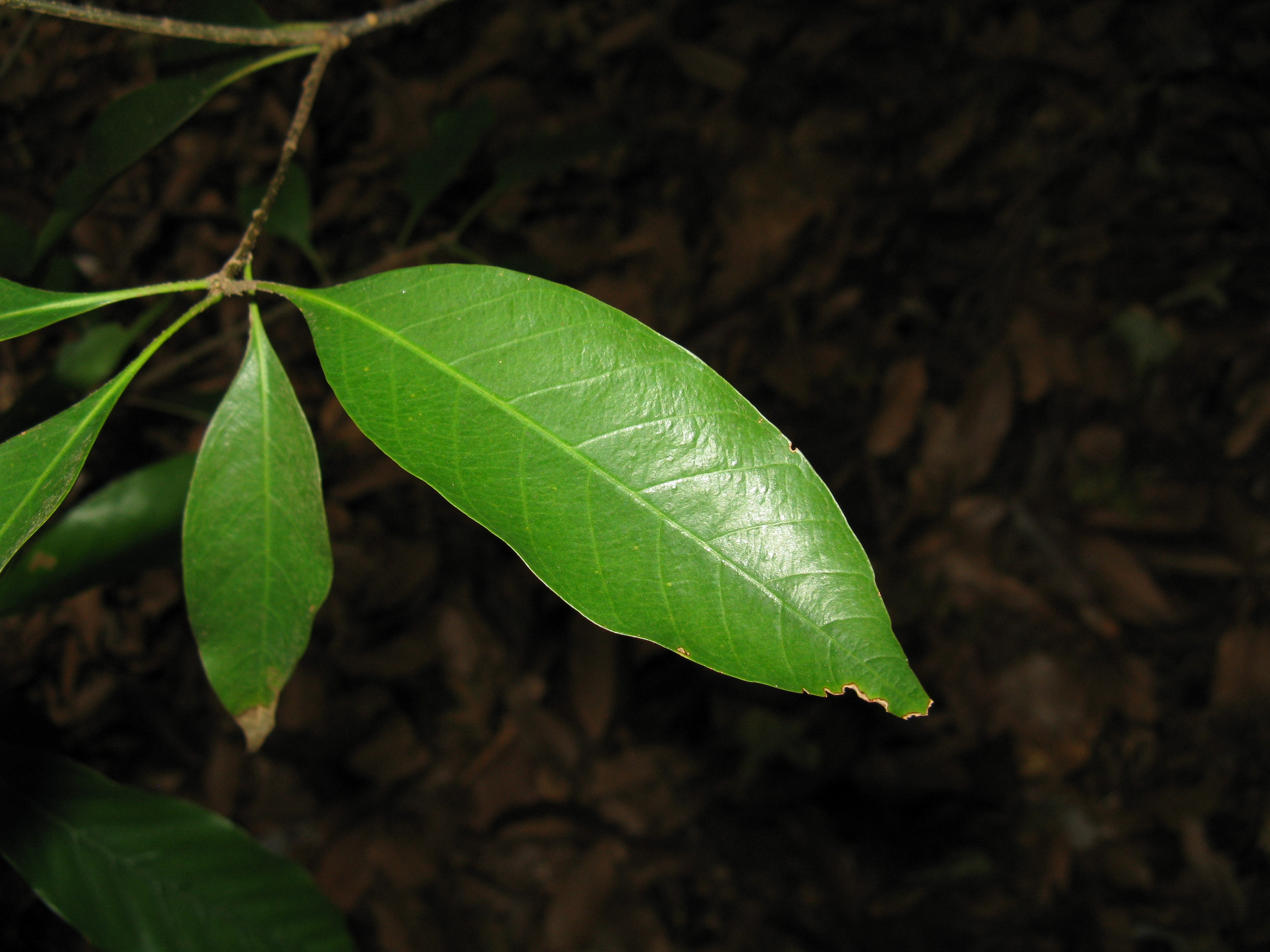

Conservation status
- Least Concern (IUCN 3.1)

Scientific classification
- Kingdom: Plantae
- Clade: Tracheophytes
- Clade: Angiosperms
- Clade: Eudicots
- Clade: Rosids
- Order: Fagales
- Family: Fagaceae
- Genus: Quercus
- Subgenus: Quercus subg. Cerris
- Section: Quercus sect. Cyclobalanopsis
- Species: Q. acuta

Binomial name
- Quercus acuta Thunb.

Synonyms
- List: Cyclobalanopsis acuta (Thunb.) Oerst.; Cyclobalanopsis acutiformis (Nakai) Nakai; Cyclobalanopsis buergeri (Blume) Oerst.; Cyclobalanopsis laevigata (Blume) Oerst.; Cyclobalanopsis marginata (Blume) Oerst.; Quercus buergeri Blume; Quercus carpostachys H.Lév. & Vaniot; Quercus kasaimok H.Lév. ex Nakai; Quercus kusaiensis H.Lév. ex Rehder; Quercus laevigata Blume; Quercus marginata Blume; Quercus pseudoglauca H.Lév. ex Nakai; Quercus quelpaertensis H.Lév. ex Nakai

= Quercus acuta =

Japanese evergreen oak

Species of oak tree

Quercus acuta, the Japanese evergreen oak, is an oak native to Japan, South Korea, Taiwan, and China's Guizhou and Guangdong provinces. It is placed in subgenus Cerris, section Cyclobalanopsis.

== Description ==
Due to its foliage and habitat, it looks rather unlike most other oaks. Quercus acuta is usually bushy and densely domed, reaching a height of 14 meters. The bark is smooth and dark grey. Leaves are dark and glossy above and yellowish beneath. They narrow to a long, finely-rounded tip. The flowers are on a stiff 5 cm catkin.

Heartwood is pale reddish brown to reddish brown. Sapwood is pale yellowish brown with a slightly reddish color.

== Common names ==
In Japan, it is called akagashi (赤樫 - あかがし), but is also known by the names oogashi (大樫 - オオガシ) and oobagashi (大葉樫 - オオバガシ).

In the Korean language, it is 붉가시.

== Uses ==
Like shirakashi (白樫 - しらかし) (Quercus myrsinifolia), whose wood is often called shirokashi outside of Japan, and other related sub-genera, Japanese Evergreen Oak, or akagashi, is a preferred choice for Japanese martial arts practice weapons such as bokken. This is due to its uniformly tight grain structure resulting from its continuous growing season. It should not be confused with the oriental or Asian white oak, Quercus aliena.
