= Shigurui =

Japanese manga series

- First tankōbon volume cover, featuring Gennosuke Fujiki

シグルイ
- Genre: Jidaigeki
- Manga
- Written by: Takayuki Yamaguchi
- Published by: Akita Shoten
- Magazine: Champion Red; (2003−2006); Champion Red Ichigo; (2007−2010)
- Original run: August 2003 – September 2010
- Volumes: 15
- Anime television series

Shigurui: Death Frenzy
- Directed by: Hiroshi Hamasaki; Assistant director: Mitsuyuki Masuhara
- Produced by: Hiroyuki Kitaura; Yasuyuki Ueda; Yoshihiro Koyama; Yukiko Ninokata
- Written by: Seishi Minakami
- Music by: Kiyoshi Yoshida
- Studio: Madhouse
- Licensed by: NA: Funimation
- Original network: Wowow
- Original run: July 19, 2007 – October 12, 2007
- Episodes: 12

Shigurui (Japanese: シグルイ; "Death Frenzy") is a Japanese manga series written and illustrated by Takayuki Yamaguchi. It was first serialized in Akita Shoten's seinen manga magazine Champion Red from 2003 to 2006, and later in Champion Red Ichigo from 2007 to 2010; its chapters were collected in fifteen tankōbon volumes. It is based on the first chapter of the novel Suruga-jō Gozen Jiai by Norio Nanjō. An anime television adaptation, aired on Wowow from July to October 2007. The series was directed by Hiroshi Hamasaki, written by Seishi Minakami, and produced by Madhouse.

The anime was licensed in North America by Funimation under the fully translated title Shigurui: Death Frenzy. The licensing was announced in May 2008 and the full series was released in March 2009, on Blu-ray and DVD. The manga and anime are both known for their graphic violence and sexual content.

== Plot ==
The story begins in 1629 Shizuoka during Tokugawa Tadanaga's rule. The daimyō staged a tournament where the participants fought with real steel Japanese swords rather than bokken ("wooden sword"), against his vassals' strong objection. The story revolves around the first match between the one-armed swordsman Fujiki Gennosuke and the blind samurai Irako Seigen and deals with the circumstances that led the two to participate in Tokugawa's tournament.

== Characters ==
Gennosuke Fujiki (藤木 源之助, Fujiki Gennosuke)
Voiced by: Daisuke Namikawa (Japanese); John Burgmeier (English)
The stoic star pupil of the Kogan dojo. In the present time in his duel with Seigen he has only one arm but it is noted that his back muscles could theoretically make up for lost strength. Fujiki is very loyal to Kogan (his master), and is said to be most likely to succeed as the school's master.
Seigen Irako (伊良子 清玄, Irako Seigen)
Voiced by: Nozomu Sasaki (Japanese); J. Michael Tatum (English)
An ambitious man who seeks to raise his status; unlike Gennosuke, who has genuine devotion to the school and its fortunes, Seigen cares little for it besides the wealth that will come his way if he can rise through the ranks. In the present time, he is blind and has a deep cut in one of his feet. Years before, he joined the Kogan-Ryuu school afterwards and was eventually picked to become the successor over Gennosuke Fujiki, but he and Kogan had a falling out which resulted in his present-day blindness.
Gonzaemon Ushimata (牛股 権左衛門, Ushimata Gonzaemon)
Voiced by: Yusaku Yara (Japanese); R. Bruce Elliott (English)
A master of the Kogan-Ryuu school and Gennosuke's senior. A hulk of a man, Ushimata uses an immensely large wooden sword (Seigen comments that it appears to be a suburitō) which he wields with ease.
Kogan Iwamoto (岩本 虎眼, Iwamoto Kogan)
Voiced by: Seizō Katō (Japanese); Jerry Russell (English)
The cruel Grandmaster of the Kogan-Ryuu school. In a state of dementia most of the time, he regains his faculties most often in the period between fall and winter. Kogan cares nothing for his daughter, Mie, seeing her only as a tool to continue his bloodline. He has a small deformity, a sixth finger on one of his hands. His technique "Nagare Boshi" (Shooting Star) is known and feared by many Samurai.
Mie Iwamoto (岩本 三重, Iwamoto Mie)
Voiced by: Houko Kuwashima (Japanese); Laura Bailey (English)
The daughter of Kogan Iwamoto. Betrothed to Seigen Irako, she instead wants to be with Gennosuke Fujiki; however, she seemingly has little to no value to her father—who greatly resents that he had a daughter instead of a son—except as breeding stock.
Lady Iku (いく, Iku)
Voiced by: Emi Shinohara (Japanese); Wendy Powell (English)
The long-suffering concubine of Kogan who initially appears resigned to life under his control. She faces public stigma outside the school due to past incidents of men mysteriously dying while in her company.

== Media ==
=== Anime ===
The series was adapted into a 12-episode anime series based on the first 32 chapters (or the initial six and a half volumes) by Madhouse and broadcast on Wowow from July 19 to October 12, 2007. The series was directed by Hiroshi Hamasaki and written by Seishi Minakami. Funimation licensed the series for release in North America. The series was later added to iTunes.

== Reception ==
Shigurui was nominated for the 15th annual Tezuka Osamu Cultural Prize in 2011. The series ranked fifth and fourth on Takarajimasha's Kono Manga ga Sugoi! list of best manga of 2007 and 2008 for male readers.
