= Mycena mustea =

Scientific classification
- Kingdom: Fungi
- Division: Basidiomycota
- Class: Agaricomycetes
- Order: Agaricales
- Family: Mycenaceae
- Genus: Mycena
- Species: M. mustea

Binomial name
- Mycena mustea Har. Takah.
- Known only from Kanagawa, Japan

Species of mushroom

Mycena mustea
- Mycological characteristics
- Gills on hymenium
- Cap is conical
- Hymenium is adnexed
- Stipe is bare
- Spore print is white
- Ecology is saprotrophic
- Edibility is unknown

Mycena mustea is a species of mushroom in the family Mycenaceae. First described as a new species in 2007, the fungus is known only from Kanagawa, Japan, where it grows on dead fallen twigs in lowland forests. The mushroom's dull violet to grayish-violet cap, initially covered with a fine whitish powder, becomes smooth as it matures, and eventually reaches a diameter of up to 10 mm (0.39 in). The stem is slender, up to 90 mm (3.5 in) long, and is covered with stiff white hairs at the base. Underneath the cap are distantly spaced pale brownish gills that are narrowly attached to the stem. Microscopic characteristics of the mushroom include the weakly amyloid spores (turning bluish to black when stained with Melzer's reagent), the club-shaped cheilocystidia (cystidia on the gill edge) featuring one or more short knob-like protuberances, the absence of pleurocystidia (cystidia on the gill face), the diverticulate cap cuticle hyphae, and the absence of clamp connections.

== Taxonomy, naming, and classification ==
The species was first collected in Japan by Hiraku Takahashi in 1999, and reported as a new species in a 2007 publication. The specific epithet is the Latin word mustea, meaning "fresh". The Japanese name is Sumire-ashinagatake.

The infrageneric classification of the fungus is unclear, and depends on what taxonomic characters are deemed most important. According to Takahashi, the mushroom's violet pigment, the inamyloid (not staining when treated with Melzer's reagent) hymenophoral tissue (hymenium-bearing tissue), and the smooth hyphae of the outer layer of stem suggest a placement in the section Adonideae (Fr.) Quel., as defined by the Dutch Mycena specialist Maas Geesteranus. However, if greater taxonomic emphasis is placed on the weakly amyloid basidiospores, it would be more appropriate in the section Fragilipedes (Fr.) Quél.

== Description ==
The cap is conical to convex to bell-shaped, occasionally with a low and broad umbo, and reaches 7 to 10 mm (0.28 to 0.39 in) in diameter. When moist, it is partly translucent, and grooves corresponding to the position of the gills under the cap can be seen. The surface is somewhat hygrophanous—it changes color as it loses or absorbs moisture. The surface is initially pruinose—covered with what appears to be a fine white powder (remnants of the universal veil that covered the immature fruit body)—but this soon sloughs off, leaving it smooth. The cap surface is a dull violet color when young, then becomes somewhat paler near the margin. The flesh is up to 0.5 mm thick, white, and lacks any distinctive odor and taste. The slender stem is 40 to 90 mm (1.6 to 3.5 in) long by 0.5 to 1.5 mm (0.020 to 0.059 in) thick, cylindrical, centrally attached to the cap, and hollow. Its surface is dry, dull violet to grayish-violet over the entire length. Like the cap surface, it is initially entirely pruinose, but becomes smooth in maturity. The base of the stem is covered with sharp, straight, and stiff white hairs. The gills are narrowly attached to the stem, and distantly spaced, with between 15 and 19 gills reaching the stem. The gills are up to 1.2 mm broad, thin, and pale brownish. The gill edges are pruinose, and the same color as the gill faces.

=== Microscopic characteristics ===
The spores are roughly ellipsoid and measure 11–12 by 6–7 μm. They are smooth, colorless, inamyloid to weakly amyloid, and thin-walled. The basidia (spore-bearing cells) are 28–37 by 8–10 μm, club-shaped, and mostly four-spored. The cheilocystidia (cystidia on the gill edge) are club-shaped, abundant, and measure 30–45 by 8–11 μm. They form a sterile gill edge. Near their tips they have one or more short knob-like excrescences (outgrowths) that are colorless, and thin-walled. M. mustea does not have cystidia on the gill face (pleurocystidia). The hymenophoral tissue is made of hyphae that are 5–16 μm wide, cylindrical (often somewhat inflated) with thin walls, smooth, colorless, and inamyloid. The cap cuticle is made of parallel, bent-over hyphae that are 2–6 μm wide, cylindrical, and covered with scattered, warty or finger-like hyaline (translucent) thin-walled diverticulae. The layer of hyphae under the cap cuticle are parallel, hyaline or pale violet, dextrinoid (turning reddish to reddish-brown in Melzer's reagent), and contain short and inflated cells that are up to 25 μm wide. The stem cuticle is made of parallel, bent-over thin-walled hyphae that are 2–6 μm wide, cylindrical, smooth, and hyaline or pale violet. The stem tissue is made of longitudinally running, cylindrical hyphae that are 8–15 μm wide, smooth, colorless, and dextrinoid. Clamp connections are absent in all tissues.

=== Similar species ===
Mycena mustea is similar to the North American species M. umbrinovinosa, which is distinguished by having a vinaceous-brown to purplish-black cap, irregularly shaped cheilocystidia that are covered at their tips with long, flexuous excrescences, and clamp connections. Mycena mustea is also similar to the European species M. urania, which differs in its blackish-violet cap, broadly club-shaped cheilocystidia covered with numerous, evenly spaced warts, and clamp connections. Mycena mustea also resembles the Japanese M. fonticola, a species described concurrently with M. mustea. Unlike that of M. fonticola, the cap of M. mustea typically becomes pale grayish-purple when mature; the cheilocystidia have several short finger-like excrescences at their tips; and the stem cuticle is made up of smooth hyphae. In contrast, the cap of M. fonticola becomes dark violet-brown when mature; there are no excrescences on the cheilocystidia; and the hyphae of the stem cuticle are sparsely covered with diverticulae that resemble warts or fingers.

== Habitat and distribution ==
Mycena mustea is known only from Kanagawa, Japan. The mushroom is found growing solitary to scattered on dead fallen twigs in lowland forests dominated by the hornbeam carpinus (Carpinus tschonoskii) and the Chinese evergreen oak (Quercus myrsinaefolia).
