= Jujutsu techniques =

Japanese martial art [jujitsu] techniques

Jujutsu techniques include joint locks, chokeholds, strikes, grappling, throwing, and other self-defense techniques.

== Techniques ==
Major categories of jujutsu techniques include, but are not limited to: joint locks, chokeholds, strikes, grappling, throwing, and takedowns.

=== Joint locks ===
Joint locks can be applied on anything that bends, such as fingers, wrists, elbows, shoulders or knees. Application of locks might include gaining purchase for throwing techniques, encouraging cooperation, submission, or restraining an aggressor. (Such techniques are taught to police forces.) Locks can also be utilized for interrogation/torture or controlling a prisoner prior to securing him using rope. In modern sporting contests, bouts are often concluded upon a submission resulting from a successful joint lock.

=== Chokeholds ===
Chokeholds including gi-chokes/strangulations (with the lapel), and no-gi. Used primarily to kill or knock unconscious. In combat, a choking technique might permanently dissociate the windpipe from the ligament supporting it, causing death by asphyxiation. Strangulation techniques may also be used for non-lethal subduing of an opponent. Fully blocking the blood flow to the brain will knock an opponent unconscious in 3 to 7 seconds. To kill by strangulation would take just over a minute before brain death occurs. In modern competition, chokes are normally banned (although they are permitted in judo competition). Strangulation is more popular in competition as they can be applied without fatal consequence, so full leverage can be applied to aid restraining of the competitor. In Jujutsu, there are many counters to choking or strangling attacks. This may have contributed to Jujutsu's popularity in self-defence applications.

=== Strikes ===
Strikes are generally taught, though the specific strike preferences vary by system. In Jujutsu, all known striking techniques are available as tools; nothing is excluded by doctrine. It is the application of those tools that distinguishes different systems of Jujutsu.

Jujutsu emphasizes the control of an opponent's balance, and therefore most systems of jujutsu do not advocate any kicks targeted above the Celiac plexus.

Atemi is the art of striking pressure points or physiological targets for kuzushi (breaking balance) or to incapacitate an opponent. Atemi is the art of striking the human body in order to cause specific physiological effects for various applications. The term "atemi" is sometimes applied to any technique whose primary purpose is to distract an opponent, setting the opponent up for another technique.

=== Grappling ===
Grappling techniques are also common. Simple grappling was incorporated into early Jujutsu systems for use in combat. More elaborate grappling techniques and strategies were likely developed for use in sporting contests in the ancient world. Such techniques have been re-introduced into the Japanese martial arts in post-reformation systems such as Judo and related Brazilian jiu-jitsu systems. In post-reformation Japan, Japanese martial arts were altered under the auspices of Kanō Jigorō and his contemporaries. The emphasis on Samurai combat skills was degraded in preference to systems that could be practiced by anyone of any age for healthy physical education, sport and self-defense. Because of this new emphasis, grappling skills have been adapted to safe sporting environments, where gouging, biting, and other unsporting techniques are banned. Only a few schools maintain the old samurai grappling techniques and training practices. The majority of schools utilize Judo training or a more combative form of grappling.

=== Takedowns ===
Takedown is a term for a technique that involves off-balancing an opponent and bringing him or her to the ground, typically with the combatant performing the takedown landing on top. Takedowns are usually distinguished from throws by the forward motion and target of advancement (typically the legs), although in some systems of terminology, throwing techniques are a type of takedown.

== Application ==
There are differences in the application of the same technique between styles of jujutsu that range from the minor to the major.

=== Rolling ===
When performing a forward shoulder roll, some styles roll on the back of the lead-hand (i.e., palm up), and some roll palm-down. A backward shoulder roll is performed by landing on one's far-side hip, palm down.

=== Wrist locks ===
Some styles perform wrist locks (or, "peels") with the bottom 3 fingers and don't use the index finger, and some use the top 3 fingers, keeping the pinky off. The intent of both approaches is the same: do not block the opponent's wrist during a peel.

=== Arm bars ===
Some styles advocate using a "live hand" (hand open) for an armbar takedown, whereas some advocate making a fist. Adherents of each approach claim "more power", though the closed-fist approach arguably offers the additional benefit of reducing the possibility of a finger getting accidentally snagged.

=== Throws ===
On a hip throw off the right hip, the most common way this throw is taught is to grab the uke's right arm with the left hand. Some styles, however, teach "wrapping" the uke's right arm with the left instead of the grab. Biomechanically, the most effective method is to grab the right upper arm using a monkey style grip. Using this method, one grips the opponent's left arm using the 4 fingers and the thumb against the palm, (instead of gripping with the thumb against the 4 fingers). The reason for using this grip rather than a normal human gripping action is that the thumb gripping against the 4 fingers is weaker in strength than the grip applied by the 4 fingers and thumb against the palm (as monkeys do when gripping the branch of a tree to swing). Grabbing the upper arm rather than the wrist allows the body greater pulling torque.

Likewise, on hip throws, some systems grab around the waist (or in ignorance, the belt), and some systems prefer to wrap Tori's right arm under the uke's left. One should never grip the opponent's belt; modern attire may not include a belt. In fact, grabbing the belt is not necessary. Simply grabbing around the waist (so long as the grip is all the way around the waist) works better anyway. It feels easier to grab an opponent's waist with one's right arm than it does to wrap one's right arm around their left arm. Biomechanically, grabbing the opponent higher up the back (such as at the shoulder) can allow the opponent to bend at the waist, making the hip throw more difficult. The sequence of actions required for the hip throw is to block, parry, or deflect the opponent's punch if necessary, effect kuzushi, bend the knees and turn whilst pulling the opponent over one's hip.

=== Grappling ===
The biggest conceptual difference is when grappling is taught, whether a style views grappling as a sport or grappling as a necessity of balanced self-defense training (or both). Both applications have merit, and the training will have a considerable amount of overlap but will also have important differences. The latter approach will need to understand the fundamentals of the grappling positional hierarchy like the former, but the priority will be to get off the ground (and get away) as fast as possible. It is also a very good technique to use when near an opponent.

== Technique Video Examples ==
- Jigo Tensin Ryu Techniques
- Jiu-Jitsu and Submission Grappling Videos
- Grappling Academy - Grappling Technique Videos
- Hontai Yoshin Ryu techniques
- Demonstration of Katori Shinto-ryu Iaijutsu
- Demonstration of Daito-ryu Aikijutsu by Kondo Sensei
- Demonstration of Takenouchi-ryu, Kogusoku (knife)
- Re-enactments of warriors in combat
- Video clips of Goshin Jujitsu techniques and self-defense techniques (Hillcrest Academy of Goshin Jujitsu, Cleveland, Ohio)
- Video clips of Takeda Ryu Aiki Jujutsu techniques and self-defense techniques (Sobukai Takeda Ryu - Romania)
