= Apocalypse Zero =

Japanese manga series

- Cover of Apocalypse Zero volume 1 as published by Media Blasters

覚悟のススメ (Kakugo no Susume)
- Genre: Action, post-apocalyptic
- Manga
- Written by: Takayuki Yamaguchi
- Published by: Akita Shoten
- English publisher: NA: Media Blasters
- Imprint: Shōnen Champion Comics
- Magazine: Weekly Shōnen Champion
- Original run: July 1994 – August 1996
- Volumes: 11
- Original video animation
- Directed by: Toshiki Hirano
- Produced by: Hiroshi Kato; Shin'ichi Hirai; Shirō Sasaki
- Written by: Akiyoshi Sakai
- Music by: Takashi Kudō
- Studio: Ashi Productions
- Licensed by: NA: Media Blasters
- Released: October 23, 1996 – December 18, 1996 (cancelled)
- Runtime: 45 minutes (each)
- Episodes: 2 (10 were planned)
- Manga

Exoskull Zero
- Written by: Takayuki Yamaguchi
- Published by: Akita Shoten
- Magazine: Champion Red
- Original run: 2010 – 2015
- Volumes: 8

Apocalypse Zero, known in Japan as Encouragement of Resolve (覚悟のススメ, Kakugo no Susume), is a manga series written and illustrated by Takayuki Yamaguchi. It was serialized in Akita Shoten's Weekly Shōnen Champion from July 1994 to August 1996.

The manga was adapted into a two episode original video animation in 1996, animated by Ashi Productions and produced by Big West, Victor Entertainment and Tomy.

== Plot ==
Kakugo and Harara are brothers trained by their father, Oboro, to slay monsters that have begun roaming the streets of a post-apocalyptic, 21st century Tokyo following a devastatingly, powerful earthquake. To aid them in their quest, Oboro entrusts his two sons with Fortified Armor Shells (強化外骨格, Kyōkagaikokkaku), cyborg exoskeletons forged using the souls of deceased warriors by their grandfather, a former scientist of the Imperial Japanese Army during World War II, Shiro Hagakure. However, Harara becomes possessed by a mysterious evil from deep within his armor, mutating his body as well as filling him with a desire to destroy all of mankind to help cleanse the Earth of contamination. Some years later, Kakugo moves to "Reverse Cross High School", located in one of the ruined districts of Tokyo near the castle from which Harara commands their demon army. It is now up to Kakugo to defeat his evil sibling and put a stop to their wicked legions.

== Characters ==
=== Main ===
Kakugo Hagakure (葉隠 覚悟, Hagakure Kakugo)
Voiced by: Kōichi Yamadera (Japanese); Tomokazu Seki (Manga Video version); Yuichi Nakamura (Exoskull Zero Drama CD); Lex Lang (English)
The main protagonist of the series, owner of the Fortified Armor Shell known as Zero (零(ぜろ)). Unlike Harara, Kakugo stuck to his duty to protect innocent citizens in trouble. This leads to several encounters with a large number of monsters which inhabit the city until finally he comes face-to-face with Harara himself. Kakugo is a stern and humorless, yet compassionate and honorable person, wearing glasses and a white uniform inspired by the regimental uniforms worn by the Imperial Japanese Navy. Kakugo is a master of the Zero Defense Form (零式防衛術, Reishiki Bōei-Jutsu) of martial arts and has eight steel balls embedded in his body, which he can absorb into himself to coat his skin in metal or eject from his body to use as weapons. His signature technique is Impact (因果, Inga) (lit. "cause and effect"), which is a counter move that redirects all of the energy of an opponent's attack back to them. Zero is mentioned to be the prototype for all other Fortified Armor Shells and is inhabited by the vengeful souls of the 3000 Japanese soldiers sacrificed to create it. The spirits within Zero form a collective consciousness, manifesting as a mass of grimacing skulls, and are able to communicate with Kakugo and advise him in battle.
His armored form resembles a red-eyed tokusatsu superhero with a long scarf similar to the Kamen Rider series.
Capcom artist Kinu Nishimura had said that Kakugo was the main inspiration for Cyberbots: Full Metal Madness protagonist, Jin Saotome.
Kiyotaka Ishimaru from the Danganronpa franchise bears resemblance to Kakugo.
Harara Hagakure (葉隠 散, Hagakure Harara)
Voiced by: Megumi Ogata (Japanese); Akira Ishida (Manga Video version); Mona Marshall (English)
Kakugo's older brother and the main antagonist of the series. Harara possesses the Fortified Armor Shell Kasumi (霞(かすみ)). Bonding with Kasumi caused his body to assume a hermaphroditic form and drove him to insanity, killing his father Oboro in combat and defeating Kakugo. Believing humanity responsible for the death of the environment, he has become determined to destroy all humans with the aid of beings known as Tactical Fiends. Like his brother, Harara has multiple steel balls embedded in his body which he can absorb to coat his body in metal and increase his strength. His signature technique, Spiral (螺旋, Rasen), draws energy from the Earth into a strike that can force an opponent's internal organs to violently erupt from their body. The Fortified Armor Shell Kasumi has a feminine form and is inhabited by the malicious spirit of Mei Inukai, whose endless hatred for humanity after her infant son was sacrificed during Kasumi's creation drives Harara's desire to exterminate humanity.
After Kakugo defeats the Tactical Fiend Eikichi, Harara directly possesses Eikichi's body in an attempt to finally destroy Kakugo. In the ensuing battle, Kakugo manages to emerge victorious over his sibling, leaving Harara in a coma for most of the manga.

=== Reverse Cross High School ===
Tsumiko Horie (堀江 罪子, Horie Tsumiko)
Voiced by: Mitsuko Horie (Japanese); Sherry Lynn (English)
A girl who goes to the same high school as Kakugo. Although frequently called unattractive and chubby, Horie is a kind and bold girl who falls in love with Kakugo after witnessing him destroy the city's monsters. She is later kidnapped by Chidokuro and turned into a Tactical Fiend, thus forcing Kakugo to fight against her, until he kisses her, which results in her turning back to her normal self. Series creator, Takayuki Yamaguchi named her after Mitsuko Horie (whom he's a fan of), in fact, her name is actually an anagram for "Mitsuko". Horie herself would later go on to voice Tsumiko in the OVA.
Hiroshi Haoka (覇岡 大, Haoka Hiroshi)
Voiced by: Toshiyuki Morikawa (Japanese); Hiroshi Nagano (Manga Video version); Doug Stone (English)
A feared delinquent at the school, he's a childhood friend to Horie and resents anyone who goes after her. Haoka initially dislikes Kakugo, but eventually comes to respect him. In the OVA, he is injured by Eikichi after managing to carry the case containing Kakugo's Zero armor to the battle, but reappears alive during the finale.
Ponta Takada (高田 ぽん太, Takada Ponta)
Voiced by: Daisuke Sakaguchi (Japanese); Mari Devon (English)
One of Haoka's friends, usually seen with Pyonsuke. He is attacked by Dogumakuro's Flower, but is saved by Kakugo. He's very good at drawing, as shown in Volume 4 where he drew a rough sketch of Chidokuro when the school guards asked him to identify Horie's captor.
Pyonsuke Fuji (藤井 ぴょん助, Fuji Pyonsuke)
Voiced by: Hiro Yūki (Japanese); Lenore Zann (credited as Zan) (English)
Haoka's other friend. Generally seen with Ponta. He often carries a sword for protection.
Aoki (青木, Aoki)
Voiced by: Sara Nakayama (Japanese); Jessica Gee (English)
A friend of Horie. She is distinguished by the bandages she always wears over her face; it is never revealed why she wears them.
Hoshino (星野, Hoshino)
Voiced by: Ryōtarō Okiayu
A senior student and leader of a group of volunteers for the school's protection. When Harara (whose taken over Eikichi's body) begins exudes killing intent which causes all the other students present (including Hoshino's own lieutenants) to collapse, he's one of the few to withstand it.
Mr. Zenigata (銭形先生, Zenigata-sensei)
Voiced by: Shigeru Chiba (Japanese); Steve Kramer (English)
One of the teachers at the school. Despite his job, Zenigata doesn't really take teaching seriously, even going as far as drinking alcohol on school grounds and sleeping through his classes while playing a recording to do his work. He's also very dismissive of, and shows little worry for, his students but secretly is quite supportive of them.
Principal (校長先生, Kōchō-sensei)
Voiced by: Kenichi Ogata (Japanese); Bob Papenbrook (English)
The head of the school in New Tokyo. He is a stalker, even having wired Tsumiko's uniform to spy on her, but he really cares for his students. After Tsumiko is kidnapped by Chidokuro, he and other students unsuccessfully try to rescue her. He later appears to sacrifice his life to save them all from one of Harara's demons, but is later on revealed to be alive when he is regurgitated, along with a number of skeletons.
Kazu Shimada
Voiced by: Shin-ichiro Miki (Japanese); Dave Mallow (English)
A student at Kakugo's school, he falls victim to Hamuko. After having his face sucked off, he is devoured by her and later regurgitated in a partially-digested state during Hamuko's battle with Kakugo, dying shortly afterwards. His body is later cremated by Kakugo after the fight.
Hiroko Uchiyama
Voiced by: Yuka Imai (Japanese); Michelle Ruff (Credited as Georgette Rose) (English)
Shimada's girlfriend, she was killed by Hamuko right in front of him.

=== Harara's lieutenants ===
Tomohisa (知久)
Voiced by: Yuzuru Fujimoto (Japanese)
Harara's adviser. He later gains the ability to transform into a winged lion.
Kagenari (影成)
Voiced by: Kenichi Ogata (Japanese); Terrence Stone (English)
An executive at Harara's fortress. He is responsible for reporting the threat of Kakugo to him. He also stores the Kasumi armor inside his body.
Bolt (ボルト, Boruto)
Voiced by: Kunihiko Yasui (Japanese); Derek Stephen Prince (English)
Harara's Security Chief. Originally an elderly human who tried to defeat Harara, he was turned into a samurai armor-clad demon. He later dons the Fortified Armor Shell Shin (震 (しん)), empowered by the souls of 400 of Harara's defeated soldiers, to fight Kakugo.
Rai (ライ)
Voiced by: Ryōtarō Okiayu (Japanese); Doug Stone (English)
Harara's Security adviser, a musclebound human who tried to defeat him, but was converted to his cause. He delivers fighters for Harara to kill at his fortress. He is adorned with the same steel balls and Kakugo and Harara, but the sheer number embedded in his body allows him to coat more of his skin in metal and assume a demonic armored form.
Chidokuro (血髑郎)
Voiced by: Shigeru Chiba (Japanese); Tony Pope (English)
The general of the Tactical Fiends, a cowardly mustachioed man in a dark helmet (based on Berserk's Femto). He manages to transform Kakugo into a Tactical Fiend only to be killed by Kakugo when he reverts to being a human.

=== Harara's Tactical Fiends ===
Hamuko (破夢子)
Voiced by: Masako Katsuki (Japanese); Melodee Spevack (Credited as Sonja S. Fox) (English)
A large, obese monster with clown-like features and the first Tactical Fiend Kakugo encounters. She enjoys killing females outright and consuming the men with them. She also wears the faces of her most recent victim as a pasty. Although initially attempting to simply subdue her, Kakugo finally kills her after disabling her powers.
Dogumakuro (毒魔愚郎)
Voiced by: Ryōtarō Okiayu (Japanese); Derek Stephen Prince (English)
The third Tactical Fiend encountered (second in the OVA), Dogumakuro is a mutant rock star capable of electrocuting his opponents with his tongue. He can also deploy a microphone from his groin that emits powerful music waves. Kakugo manages to overcome his techniques and defeats him by shattering his skull and evaporating his body.
Eikichi (永吉)
Voiced by: Takeshi Aono (Japanese); Steve Kramer (English)
An elderly Tactical Fiend who is sent to attack Kakugo. He can solidify his saliva and form weapons with it, and his penis is a dragon head with the same skill. Though he manages to gain the upper hand against the unarmored Kakugo, he is quickly defeated once Kakugo gains his Zero Armor. His body is then possessed by Harara, though since he has already died by this point, rigor mortis sets in, allowing Kakugo to gain the upper hand and defeat him, incapacitating Harara.
Megumi (恵魅)
Voiced by: Yūko Miyamura (Japanese); Melissa Fahn (English)
Taking on the form of a nurse, Megumi is a Tactical Fiend who attempts to seduce men before killing them. In her monster form, she has large breasts that serve as tentacles, and is capable of full regeneration. Kakugo kills her by fully dismembering her.

=== Others ===
Oboro Hagakure (葉隠 朧, Hagakure Oboro)
Voiced by: Hidekatsu Shibata (Japanese); Tesshō Genda (Manga Video version); Tony Pope (English)
The father of Kakugo and Harara who was responsible for their training. After Harara is driven to insanity by bonding with Kasumi, he demands to fight his father. Oboro dons his own Fortified Armor Shell, Hyō (雹(ひょう)), and is killed in the ensuing duel.
Shiro Hagakure (葉隠 四郎, Hagakure Shirō)
The grandfather of Kakugo and Harara, who created the Fortified Armor Shells and the Tactical Fiend technology for Japan to win the Pacific War, causing thousands of deaths through his brutal and inhumane experiments. He was said to be executed by the Japanese government to cover up his experiments, but he secretly survived thanks to his science.
Mei Inukai (犬養 冥, Inukai Mei)
A nurse working for Shiro Hagakure, wife to a Japanese Imperial soldier named Shinobu Inukai. Both of them were murdered to use their son Tamataro for the creation of the Kasumi armor, but Mei's grudge reached the armor and infused it with hate towards humanity. It was only dissipated after Kakugo destroys the armor and Tsumiko redeems Tamataro's spirit through her love.

== Media ==
=== Manga ===
The Apocalypse Zero manga series was written and illustrated by Takayuki Yamaguchi. It was originally serialized in the Akita Shoten magazine Weekly Shōnen Champion from 1994 to 1996. A total of 11 tankōbon (chapter collections) volumes were published by Akita Shoten. An English translation of the manga was published as a graphic novel in the US by Media Blasters beginning on January 19, 2005. The manga was sold shrink wrapped, presumably due to the large amount of violence. Only six of the original 11 volumes were translated and released, as Media Blasters chose to cease publication of the series in early 2007.

The manga was published in Italy by Dynamic Italia, flipping it in a left-to-right format.

From 2010 to 2014, Yamaguchi wrote Exoskull Zero, a reboot of Apocalypse Zero featuring a similar protagonist in a slightly different plot. It was published in Akita Shoten's Champion Red magazine.

From 2015 to 2021, Yamaguchi wrote Efu no Shichinin ("The Seven of Efu"), a prequel of Exoskull Zero.

=== OVA ===
The Apocalypse Zero anime OVA was co-produced by Victor Entertainment, Tomy and Big West, it was animated by Ashi Productions and directed by Toshiki Hirano. It was released in Japan in two volumes from October 23, 1996, to December 18, 1996, on VHS and Laserdisc. The OVA was planned to have ten episodes, but was canceled after the completion of the second episode. The reasons for the OVA's cancellation are currently unknown. The anime was released in Italy in 1999 on VHS, licensed by Dynamic Italia. The US license for Apocalypse Zero was acquired by Media Blasters who created a dubbed English language version of the anime translated by Takashi Sakudo and produced by Bang Zoom! Studios. The two VHS volumes were released from June 20 to August 22, 2000. A DVD release containing both episodes was released on August 28, 2001.

A Region 2 DVD of the series with both episodes was released in Japan by Toshiba in 2003.

=== Video game ===
A video game based on Apocalypse Zero was released on the PlayStation on March 21, 1997, exclusively in Japan by Tomy. The game is a standard 3D fighting game allowing the player to go head-to-head against the CPU or against another player. It features seven characters to choose from based on both the anime and manga, and animated cut scenes taken from the OVA.

== Reception ==
Due to the use of gratuitous violence and repulsive imagery, critical reception to Apocalypse Zero in the west has been largely negative. John Oppliger of AnimeNation called the Apocalypse Zero OVA "the most viscerally violent and gruesome anime" he has seen and "arguably the most grotesque anime ever made". Animerica called Apocalypse Zero the "Best Anime Splattervision" in its "Best of the Best" awards. "When a 45-minute video features a scene where someone's face is sucked off, and that's not even the most shocking thing in the video," the magazine proclaimed, "you know you'll be getting your horror-show money's worth."

Despite this, the manga was well received and popular in Japan. Apocalypse Zero managed to be one of the finalists for the 1997 Tezuka Osamu Cultural Prize, losing out to Doraemon by Fujiko Fujio.

The OVA's entry in The Encyclopedia of Science Fiction notes that the OVA "focuses on the grotesque imagery that dominates the manga, with over-the-top monsters –often sexualized, though in very different ways [...] – and considerable gore. Nonetheless, thanks to the cartoony nature of the monsters and violence, the horror is often overwhelmed by the absurdity. Providing the viewer leaves their finer sensibilities at the door, this is an enjoyable OVA series.". The reviewer also expressed regret that the unanimated parts include an interesting the subplot which explained how the powered armor used by some characters was made through ruthless sacrifices of civilians in a project overseen by Imperial Japan's military, with the participation of Shiro Ishii, the director of the infamous Unit 731.

== Context ==
The Japanese title is an allusion to An Encouragement of Learning (Gakumon no Susume) from Fukuzawa Yukichi, an important early Japanese advocate during Meiji Restoration.
