= Gekiko Kamen =

Japanese manga series by Takayuki Yamaguchi

- First tankōbon volume cover

劇光仮面
- Genre: Tokusatsu
- Manga
- Written by: Takayuki Yamaguchi
- Published by: Shogakukan
- Imprint: Big Superior Comics
- Magazine: Big Comic Superior
- Original run: December 10, 2021 – present
- Volumes: 9

Gekiko Kamen (劇光仮面) is a Japanese manga series written and illustrated by Takayuki Yamaguchi. It began serialization in Shogakukan's Big Comic Superior magazine in December 2021.

== Synopsis ==
Set in modern times, Otoya Jissoji is a 29-year-old man who works part time jobs in art modelling and selling customized model kits. In his university days, he was a member of a club named "Tokubiken", where they would design cosplays of their favorite tokusatsu works. Jissoji still clings on to those days due to his lack of social skills. After the death of a colleague in their club, the members including Jissoji decide to reunite.

== Publication ==
Written and illustrated by Takayuki Yamaguchi, Gekiko Kamen began serialization in Shogakukan's Big Comic Superior magazine on December 10, 2021. Its chapters have been collected into nine tankōbon volumes as of June 2026.

No.	Release date	ISBN
1	May 30, 2022	978-4-09-861363-2
2	October 28, 2022	978-4-09-861506-3
3	April 28, 2023	978-4-09-861744-9
4	October 30, 2023	978-4-09-862637-3
5	April 30, 2024	978-4-09-862816-2
6	October 30, 2024	978-4-09-863111-7
7	June 30, 2025	978-4-09-863457-6
8	December 26, 2025	978-4-09-863737-9
9	June 30, 2026	978-4-09-864023-2

== Reception ==
The series has been recommended by tokusatsu filmmakers Shinji Higuchi and Takashi Yamazaki, and manga artists Kazuhiko Shimamoto and Yoshihiro Togashi.

The series was ranked fifth in the 2023 edition of Takarajimasha's Kono Manga ga Sugoi! guidebook for the best manga for male readers. The series was ranked sixteenth in Freestyle magazine's "The Best Manga" 2023 edition, it was also ranked 20th in the 2024 edition. The series was nominated for the 16th Manga Taishō and was ranked ninth. The manga was nominated for the 2024 Next Manga Award in the print category.
