= Suburi =

Japanese word for practice swings used in sports

Suburi (素振り; lit: naked or unadorned swing) is a Japanese word for practice swings used in sports such as baseball, tennis, golf, and in martial arts. Outside Japan, the word is used exclusively for repetitive individual cutting exercises used in Japanese martial arts such as kendo, aikido, iaidō, and kenjutsu. Often a shinai (for kendo), bokken, suburitō, or even tanren bō are used. An iaitō or shinken can also be used, albeit rarely.

Some common types (these can vary between styles):

katate-suburi (片手素振り)
holding the weapon with only the left hand (which is supposed to be used as the power hand)
haya-suburi (速素振り)
rapid suburi where you cut on the forward motion and assume jodan on the return motion, feet should glide on the floor. Sometimes called choyaku-men
chōyaku-suburi (跳躍素振り)
incorporating a coordinated jumping like movement with the strike
jōge-suburi (上下素振り)
strikes with back swings that almost touch ones lower back and forward swings which almost touch the floor
naname-suburi (斜め素振り)
alternating diagonal strikes, cutting across the opponent's torso, starting with a cut to the left
shōmen-suburi (正面素振り)
strikes to an opponent's forehead
zenshin-kōtai-shōmen-suburi (前進後退正面素振り)
strikes to an opponent's forehead, starting with forward, then backward.
sayū-men-suburi (左右面素振り)
alternating strikes to an opponent's forehead, starting with your right-hand side.

Suburi is used as a warm up before actual practice begins, usually done in sets of ten, though sometimes sets of 100 are used (especially with naname-suburi and shomen suburi). Suburi serves to loosen the wrists (naname suburi) and elevate heart rate (haya suburi).

== See also ==
- Aikido (Aiki-ken)
- Iaidō
- Kendo
- Kenjutsu
