= Takayuki Yamaguchi (artist) =

Japanese manga artist (born 1966)

- Born: November 1, 1966 (age 58); Tokyo, Japan
- Occupation: Manga artist
- Known for: Apocalypse Zero and Shigurui

Takayuki Yamaguchi (山口貴由, Yamaguchi Takayuki, born November 1, 1966, in Tokyo) is a Japanese manga artist. He is the creator of Apocalypse Zero and Shigurui.

== Works ==
- Cyber Momotaro (サイバー桃太郎) (1990, Jackpot)
- Demonic Illusion Chronicle: Cyber Momotaro (魔幻戦記 ~ サイバー桃太郎) (1991, Jackpot)
- Heisei Armament Justice Brigade (平成武装正義団) (1992, Jackpot)
- Demon Order Garan (悪鬼御用ガラン) (1993, Jackpot)
- Kakugo no Susume (覚悟のススメ) (1994, Akita Shoten); English translation Apocalypse Zero (2005, Media Blasters)
- Goku Road (悟空道) (1997, Akita Shoten)
- Lullaby of Gunsmoke (銃声の子守唄) (1997, Akita Shoten)
- Bang You Gravitation (蛮勇引力) (2001, Hakusensha)
- Shigurui (シグルイ) (2003, Akita Shoten); adapted into a 12 episode anime series by Madhouse
- Exoskull Zero (エクゾスカル零) (2010, Akita Shoten)
- Makengou Gageki (魔剣豪画劇) (2013, Comic Ran Twins)
- Efu no Shichinin (衛府の七忍) (2015, Akita Shoten)
- Gekiko Kamen (劇光仮面) (2021, Shogakukan)

== Collaborations ==
- Tekken 6 (鉄拳6) (2009, Bandai Namco Games); Kazuya Mishima's 3P costume design
