= Kuzushi =

Term in Japanese martial arts

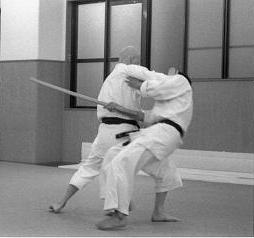
The wooden sword is no longer an effective weapon since the attacker's balance has been compromised.

Kuzushi (崩し:くずし) is a Japanese term for unbalancing an opponent in the Japanese martial arts.

The noun comes from the transitive verb kuzusu (崩す), meaning to level, pull down, destroy or demolish. As such, it refers to not just an unbalancing, but the process of putting an opponent to a position, where stability, and hence the ability to regain uncompromised balance for attacking, is destroyed.

In judo, it is considered an essential principle and the first of three stages to a successful throwing technique: kuzushi, tsukuri (fitting or entering) and kake (execution).

Kuzushi is important to many styles of Japanese martial arts, especially those derived from, or influenced by, Ju Jutsu training methods, such as Judo, Ninjutsu, Aikido, Uechi-ryu karate, Goju-ryu karate, and Wadō-ryū karate.

The methods of effecting kuzushi depend on maai (combative distance) and other circumstances. It can be achieved using tai sabaki (body positioning and weak lines), taking advantage of the opponents actions (push when pulled, pull when pushed), atemi (strikes), or a combination of all three.

== Judo ==
There are three primary ways of applying kuzushi in judo

- direct action (e.g. pulling or pushing while entering for a throw)
- inducing opponent's action (e.g. a feint or combination attack)
- direct action by opponent (e.g. a counter throw)
