= Suburitō =

Wooden practice sword from Japan

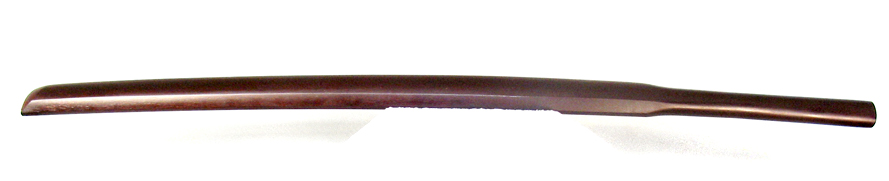
A suburito

A suburitō (素振り刀) is a type of bokken, a wooden practice sword originating in Japan and used in Japanese martial arts. Suburi (素振り; literally, "basic or plain swing") means "practice swing"; a suburitō is therefore used to practice sword-swinging.

== Description and use ==
The suburitō is much thicker at the blade than the handle which makes the suburitō much heavier than a normal bokken. Suburitō are used for practicing suburi (sword swinging exercises) and kata (prearranged exercises). The weight of the suburitō is used for strengthening and conditioning in addition to development of spirit. The suburitō is used to perfect individual technique as well.

A suburitō is commonly around 115 cm (45 in) in length, with a mass of 1 kg (2.2 lb). However, these bokuto can vary widely in size and weight. Suburitō generally do not include a guard.

Legend has it that Miyamoto Musashi carved a bokken that resembled a suburitō out of a boat oar as he traveled to his famous duel with Sasaki Kojiro, whom he supposedly killed.

=== Tanren bō ===
A tanren bō (鍛錬棒) is a bat used in aikido for strength and suburi training. Despite being only 3 feet (0.91 m) overall, with 10 inches for the handle, the "blade" is a large lump of rectangular wood, with its cross-section being a square with dimension of three square inches, and has an overall weight of 4 to 7 lbs.

By designating one corner as edge, an aikidoka can use it as an even heavier suburitō, practice suburi, kata, hasuji (edge-angle) and tomei (swing stopping), and learn the bounce-back of the sword by practising against tenu-ichi, now typically a tyre stood upright on a concrete base.

As it is designed towards aikido and strength training, specifically for getting used to the weight of a heavy-handled object, it does not resemble a sword in shape, length, or mass. Thus, unlike suburito, it is less effective for learning the katana's cut, and is not suited for contact with other swords.
