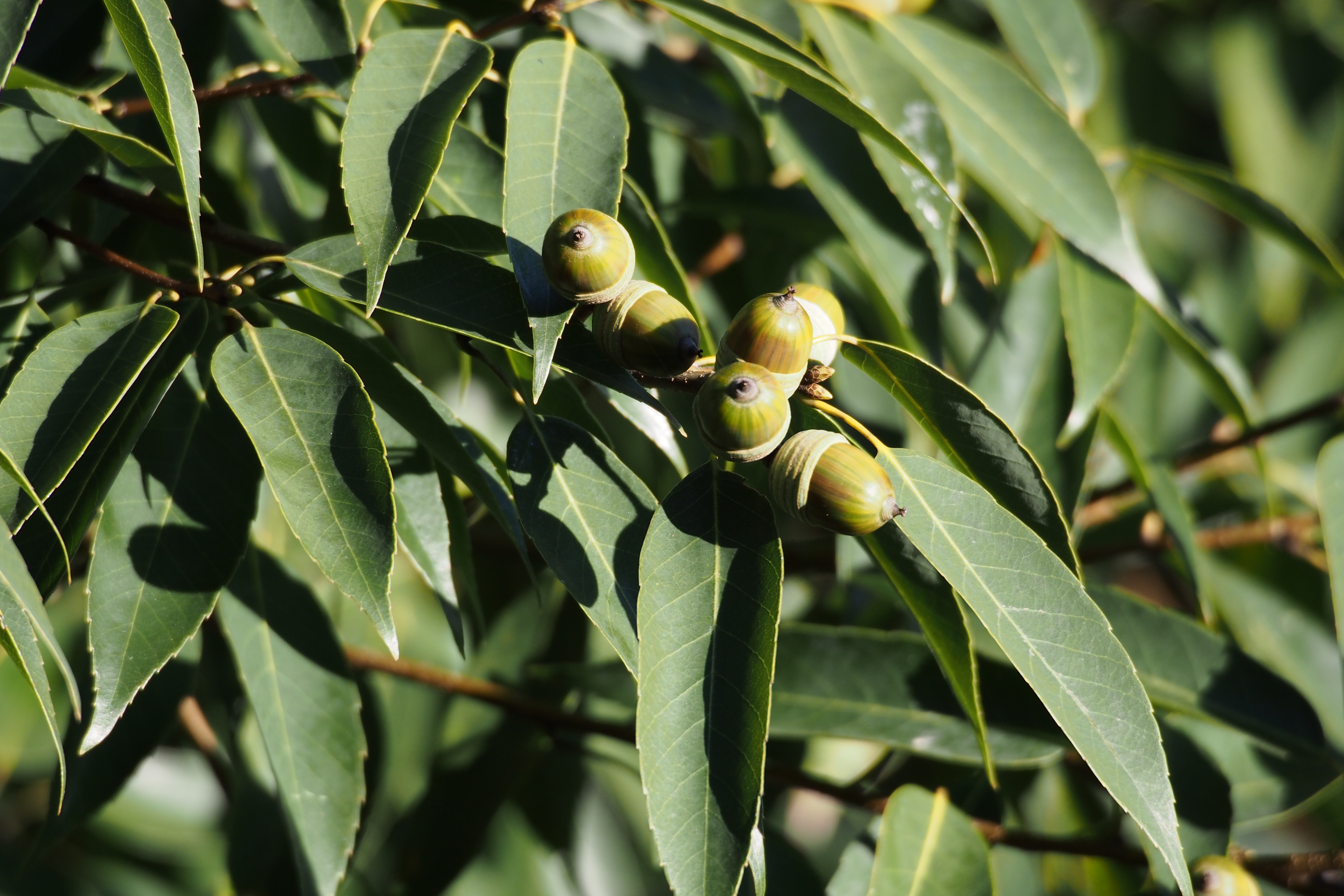

Conservation status
- Least Concern (IUCN 3.1)

Scientific classification
- Kingdom: Plantae
- Clade: Tracheophytes
- Clade: Angiosperms
- Clade: Eudicots
- Clade: Rosids
- Order: Fagales
- Family: Fagaceae
- Genus: Quercus
- Subgenus: Quercus subg. Cerris
- Section: Quercus sect. Cyclobalanopsis
- Species: Q. myrsinifolia

Binomial name
- Quercus myrsinifolia Blume

Synonyms
- List: Cyclobalanopsis myrsinifolia (Blume) Oerst.; Quercus bambusifolia Fortune, nom. nud.; Quercus myrsinaefolia Blume, orth. var.; Quercus sirokasi Siebold, nom. nud.

= Quercus myrsinifolia =

Bamboo-leaf oak

Species of oak tree

Quercus myrsinifolia is an Asian species of tree in the beech family Fagaceae. It has several common names, including bamboo-leaf oak, Chinese evergreen oak, and Chinese ring-cupped oak. Its Chinese name is 小叶青冈; pinyin: xiǎo yè qīng gāng, which means little leaf ring-cupped oak (literally translated as little leaf green ridge tree), in Japan it is called white oak (白樫, shirakashi; not to be confused with Quercus alba) and in Korea it is known as gasinamu (가시나무). It is native to east central and southeast China, Japan, Korea, Laos, northern Thailand, and Vietnam. It is placed in subgenus Cerris, section Cyclobalanopsis.

== Description ==
Quercus myrsinifolia is an evergreen oak tree that grows up to 20 metres (66 ft) tall. Leaves are 60–110 × 18–40 mm with serrulate margins; the petiole is 10–25 mm long. The acorns are ovoid to ellipsoid, 14–25 × 10–15 mm, and glabrous with a rounded apex; the flat scar is approx. 6 mm in diameter. Cupules are 5–8 × 10–18 mm, enclosing 1/3–1/2 of acorn, bracts are not connate at the apex.

== Gallery ==
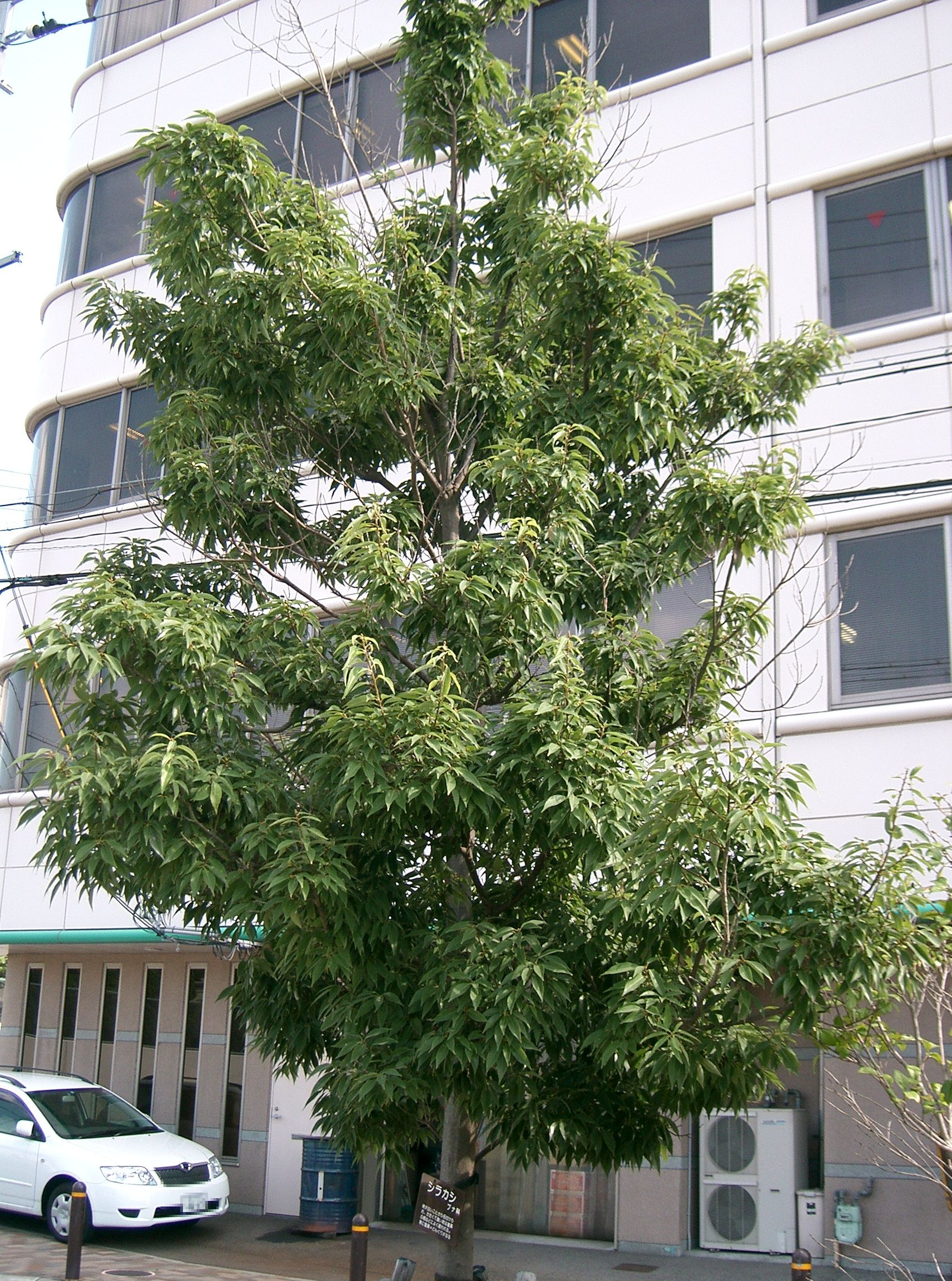
Specimen in Hyougo, Japan.

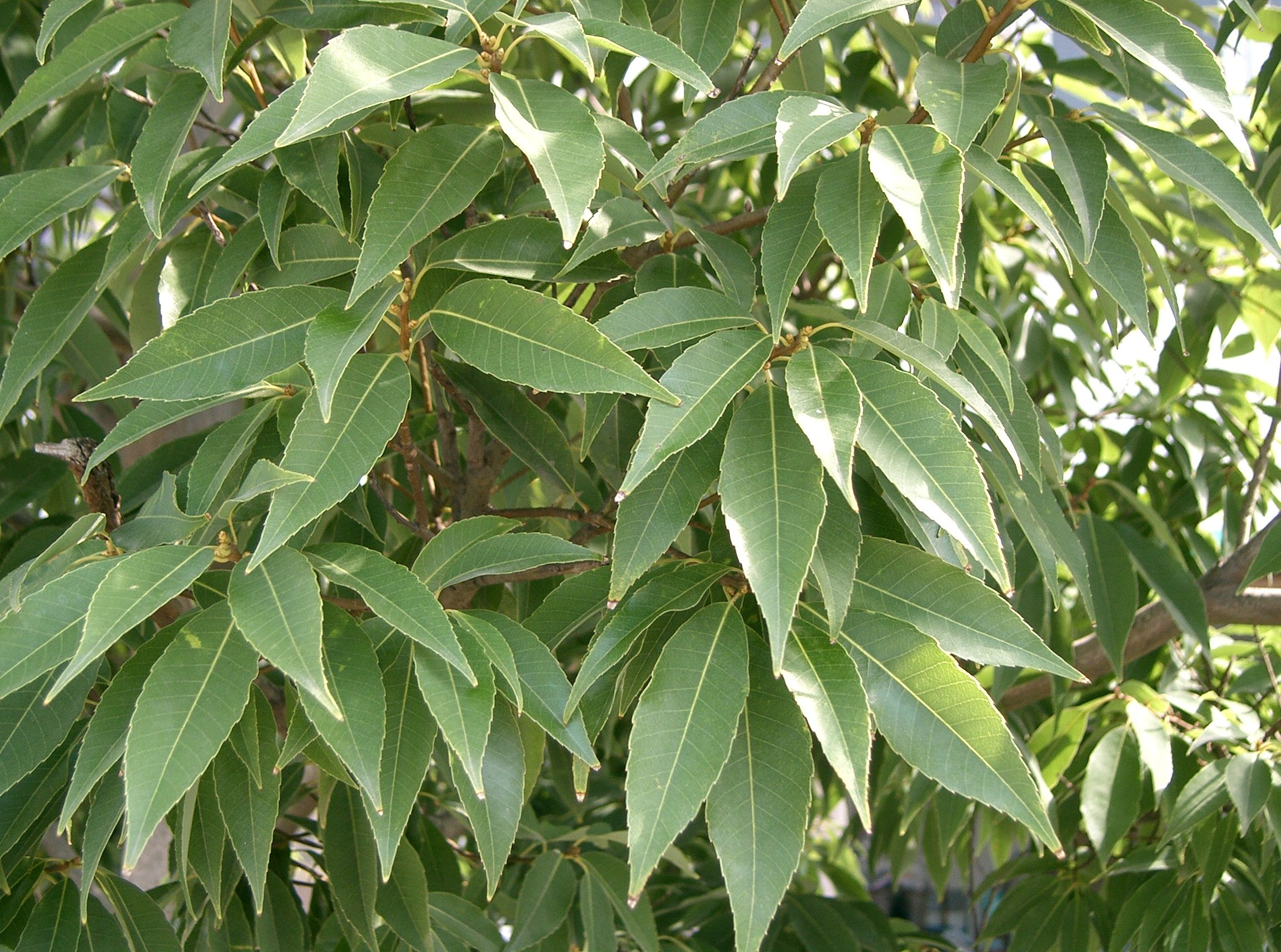
Detail of the leaves

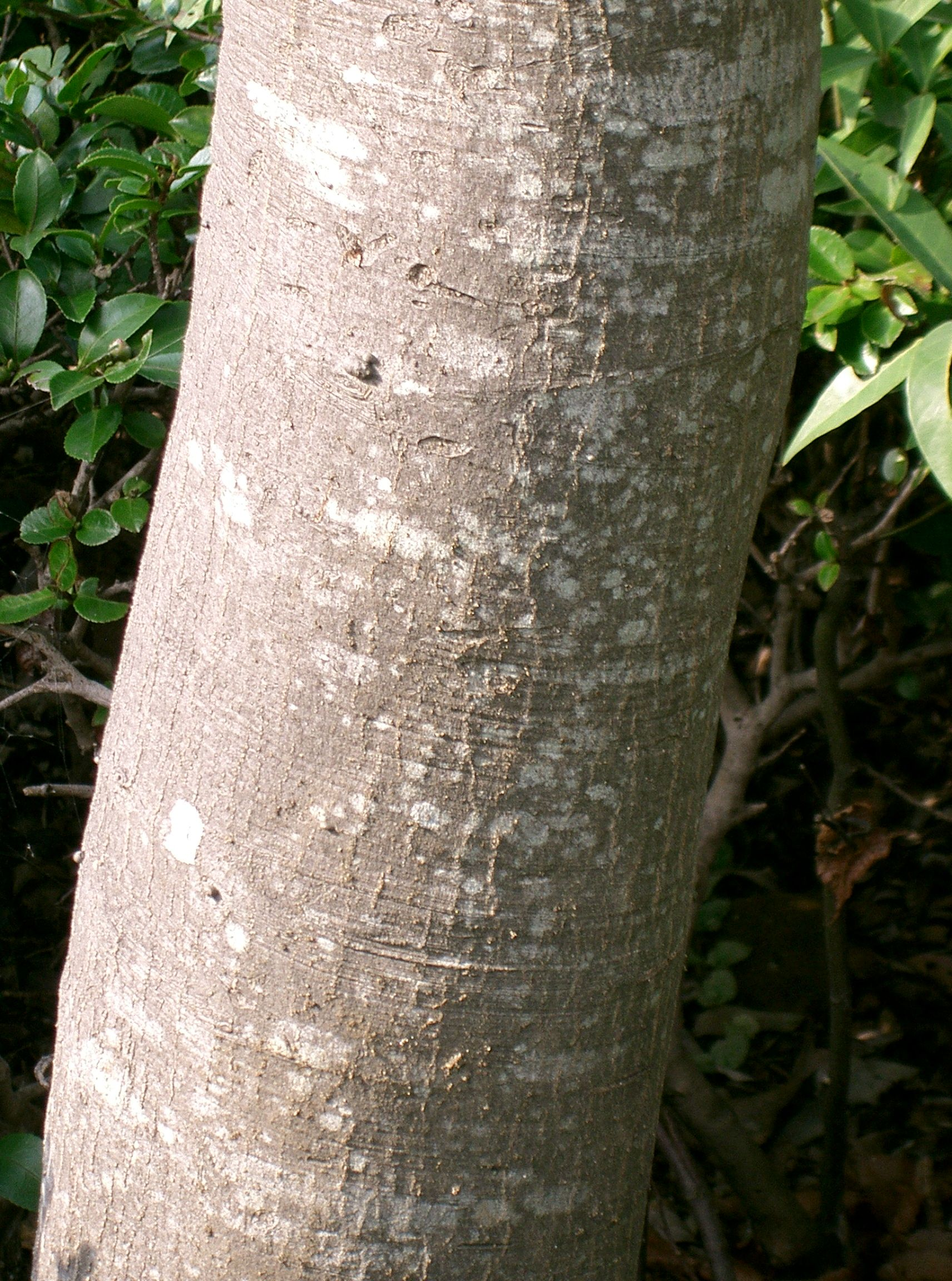
Detail of the bark

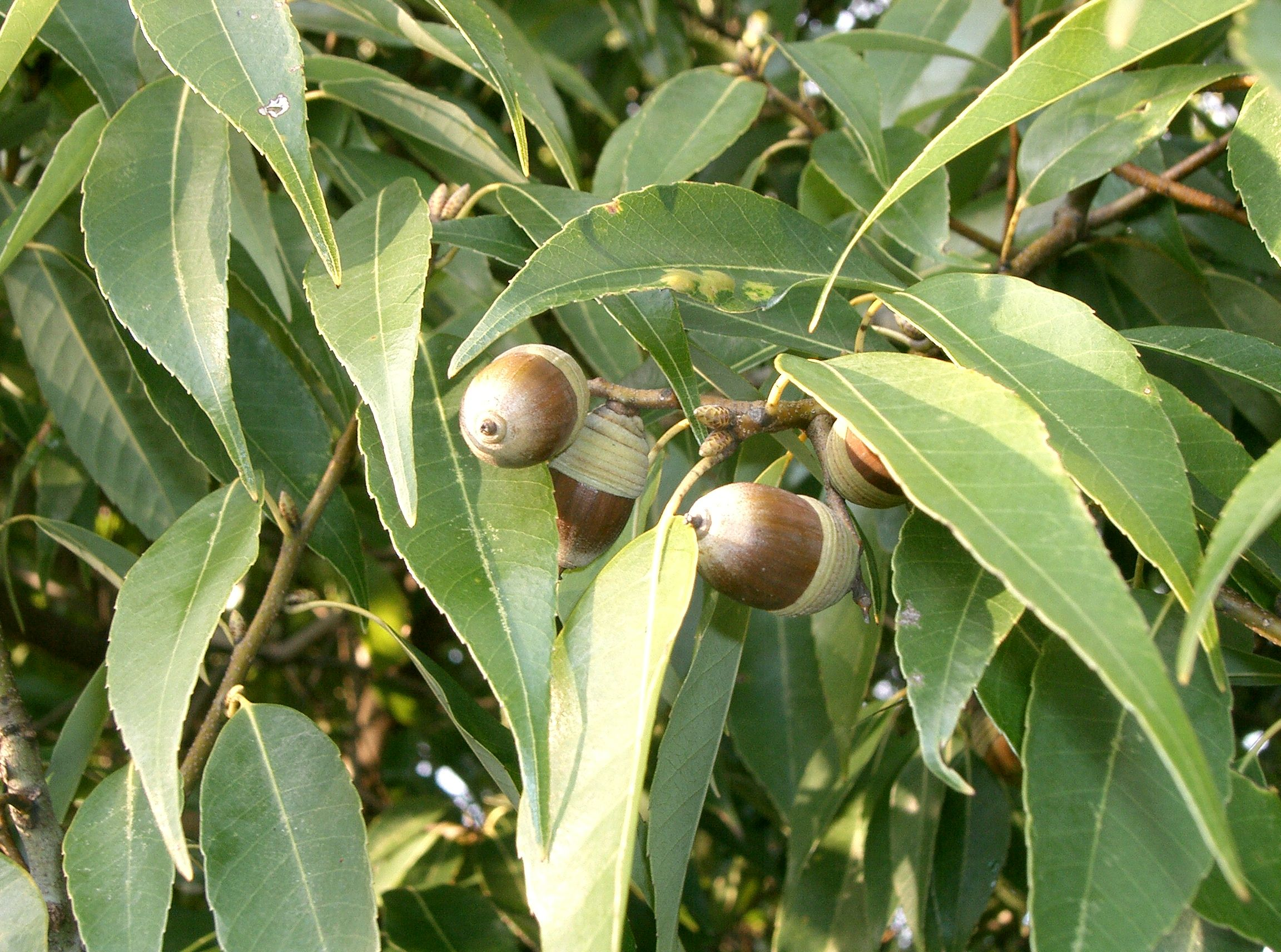
The acorns and leaves

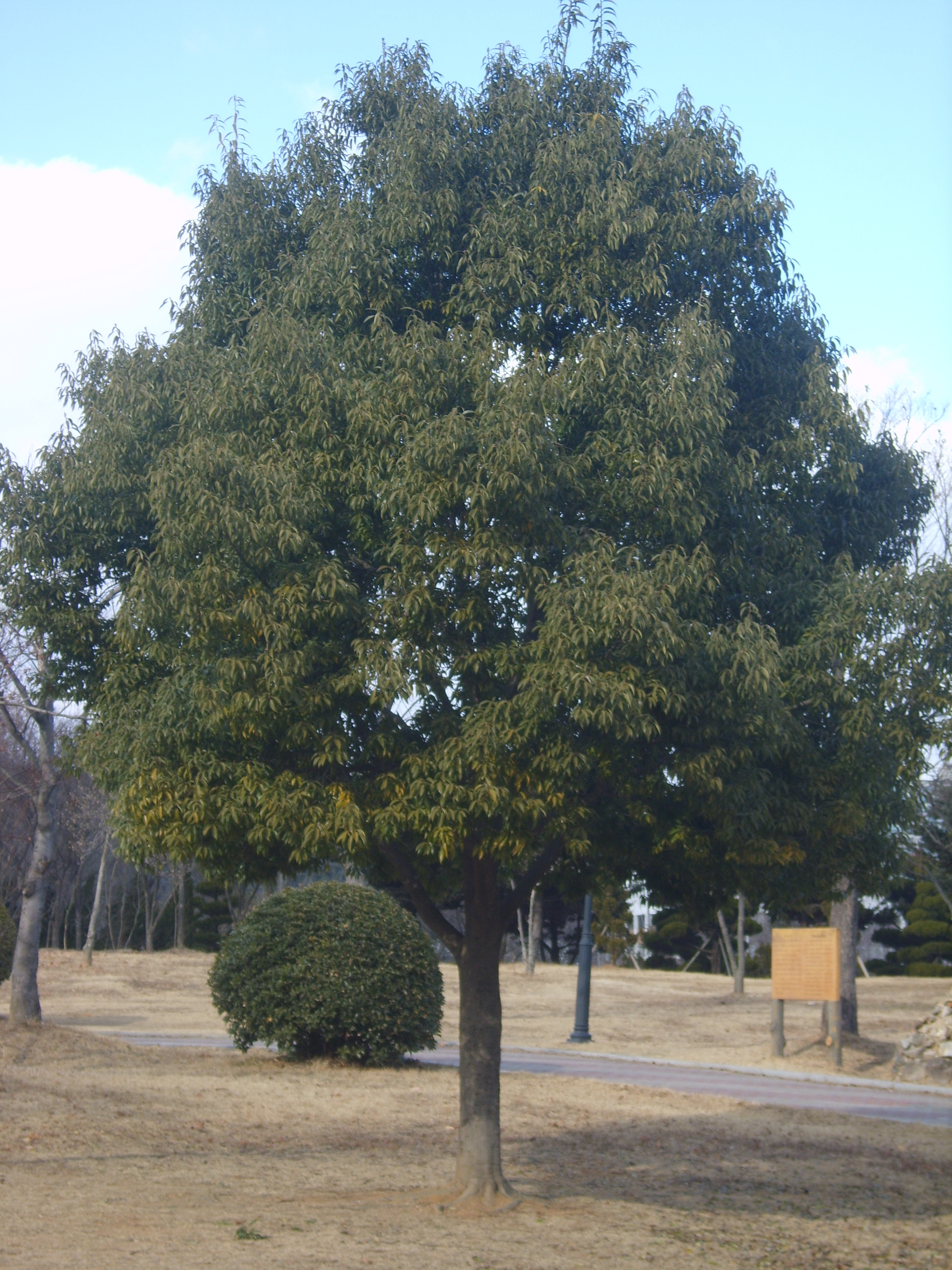
Specimen in Gwangju

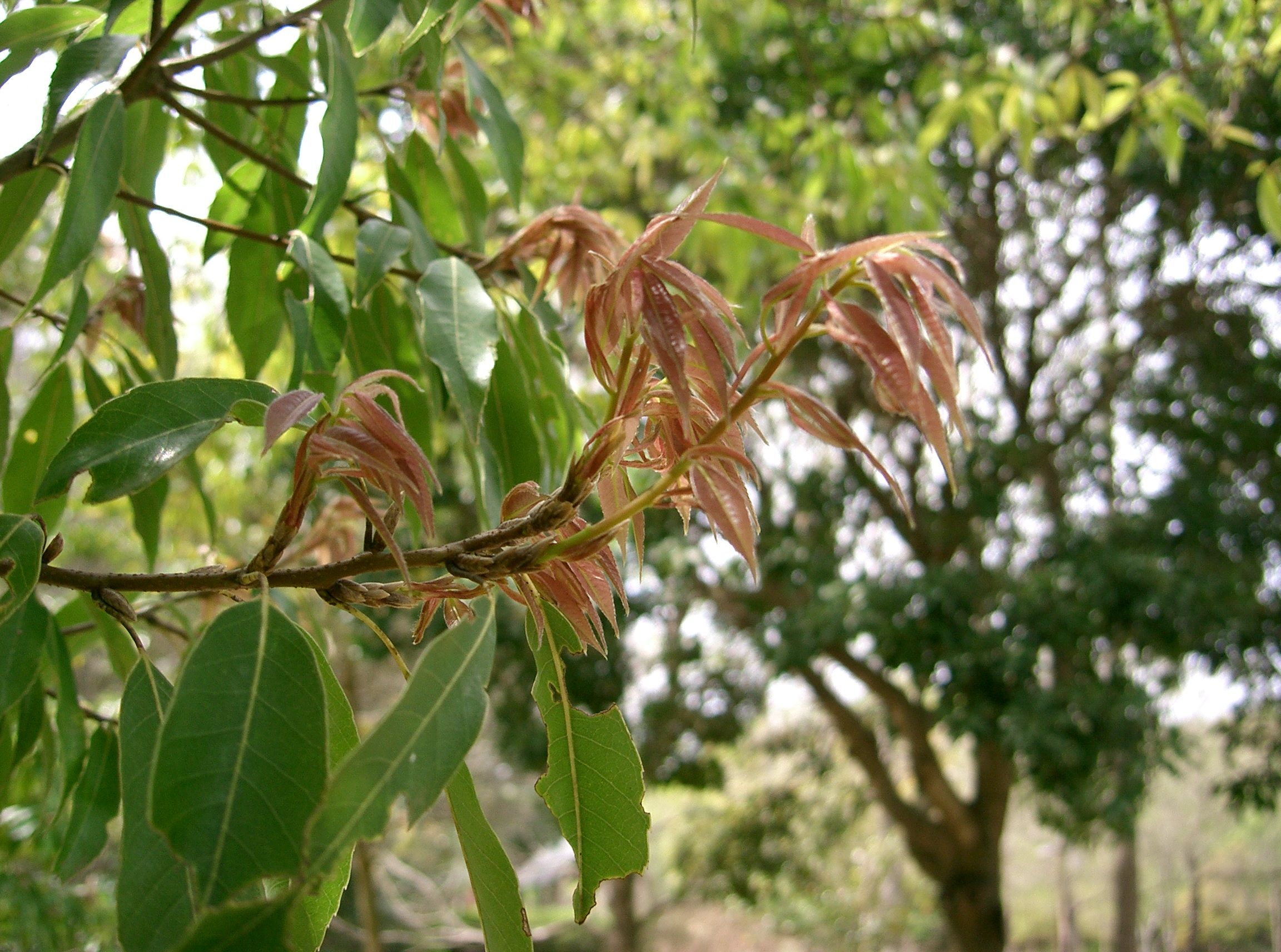
New growth

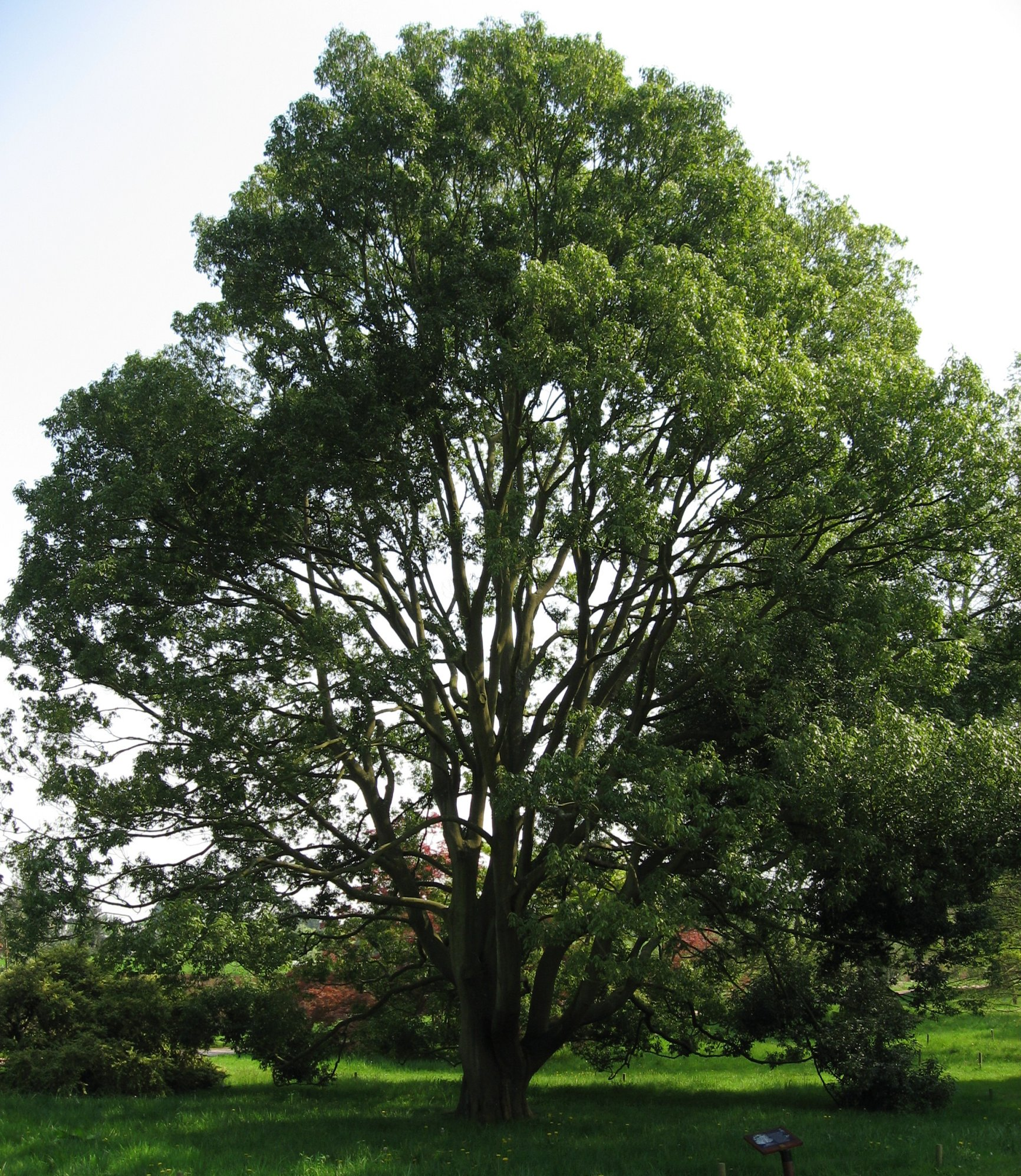
Specimen in France
