= Bokken =

Japanese wooden sword used for training

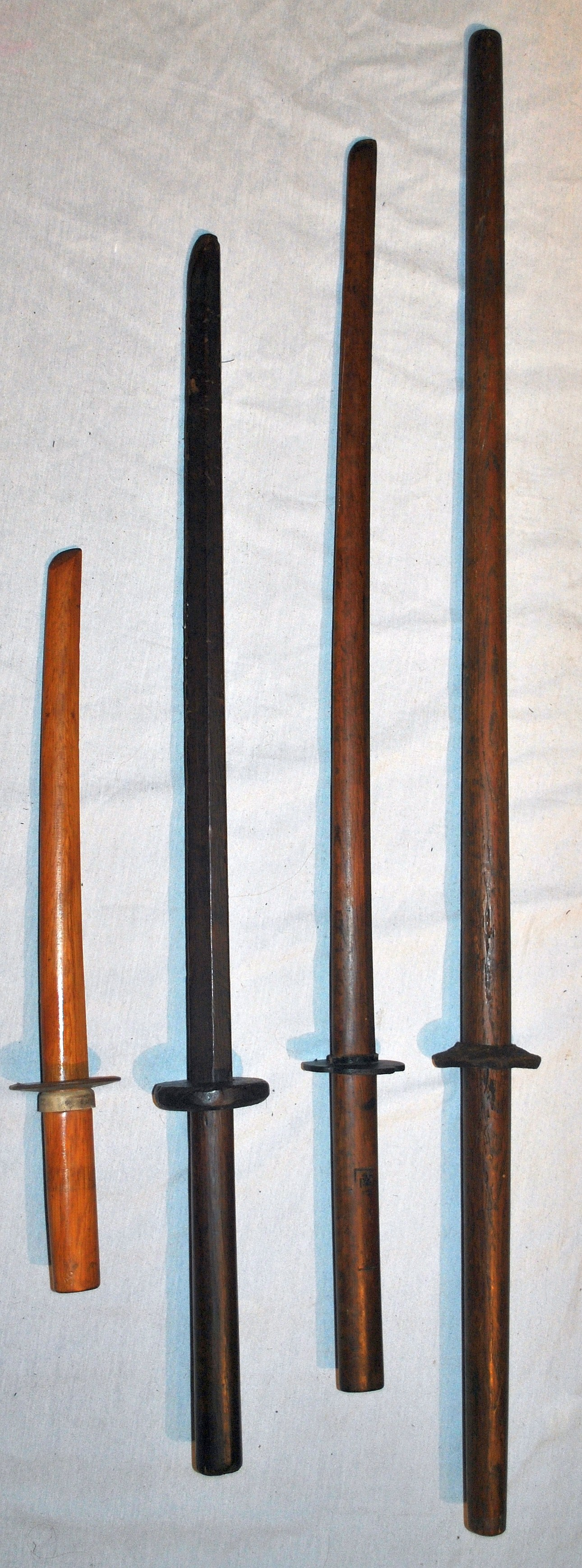
Various types of bokken

A bokken (木剣, bok(u), 'wood', and ken, '(double-edged) sword') or bokutō (木刀, boku, 'wood', and tō, '(single-edged) sword') is a Japanese wooden sword used for training in kenjutsu. It is usually the size and shape of a katana, but is sometimes shaped like other swords, such as the wakizashi and tantō. Some ornamental bokken are decorated with mother-of-pearl work and elaborate carvings. Sometimes, it is spelled "boken" in English.

Bokken are traditionally composed of red oak or white oak, although any hardwood can be used. In comparison, practice swords made of flexible, soft wood such as bamboo are referred to as shinai.

== History ==
It is hard to determine precisely when the first bokken appeared due to secrecy in ancient martial arts training and loose record-keeping. While various mock weapons were surely used during the earlier periods of Japanese history, usage of bokken in their modern form first emerged during the Muromachi Period (1336–1600) for the training of samurai warriors in the various ryū (schools of martial arts and swordsmanship) of the era.

If a steel katana is repeatedly used, it can easily become nicked and the edge flawed, potentially leading to a broken expensive sword. Bokken are safer than fighting with real swords, and are considerably more durable. A wielder can make contact with other trainee's swords with little fear of damage.

While bokken are safer for sparring and practice than katana, they are still lethal weapons in the hands of trained users. A famous legend to this effect involves Miyamoto Musashi, a ronin known to fight fully armed foes with only one or two bokken. According to the story, he agreed to a duel with Sasaki Kojiro, in the early morning on Ganryūjima, a tiny sandbar between Kyushu and Honshu. Musashi overslept the morning of the duel, and made his way to the duel late. He carved a bokken from an oar with his knife while traveling on a boat to the duel. At the duel, Sasaki was armed with his large nodachi, yet Musashi crushed Sasaki's skull with a single blow from his bokken, killing him. While many elements of the story are likely apocryphal, the potential danger of a bokken from the legend is real.

Before the Meiji era, bokken were very likely manufactured by woodworkers not specialized in bokken manufacture. At the beginning of the 20th century, bokken manufacture started more formally, mainly in Miyakonojō, a city on Kyushu Island. The four remaining bokken workshops of Japan are located in Miyakonojō.

Another notable spot where bokken were manufactured and sold as tourist souvenirs was Aizuwakamatsu. The resulting bokken were frequently inscribed with the markings of the Byakkotai, a youth battalion that committed mass suicide nearby during the 1868 Battle of Aizu. During the late Showa era in the 1970s and 1980s, these suicides were romanticized as a bold and heroic act, and bokken marked with their emblem sold well.

The "standard bokken", mostly used in kendo, iaido, and aikido, was created by master Aramaki Yasuo, in collaboration with the All Japan Kendo Federation in the 1950s and was the first standardized bokken ever created.

== Usage ==
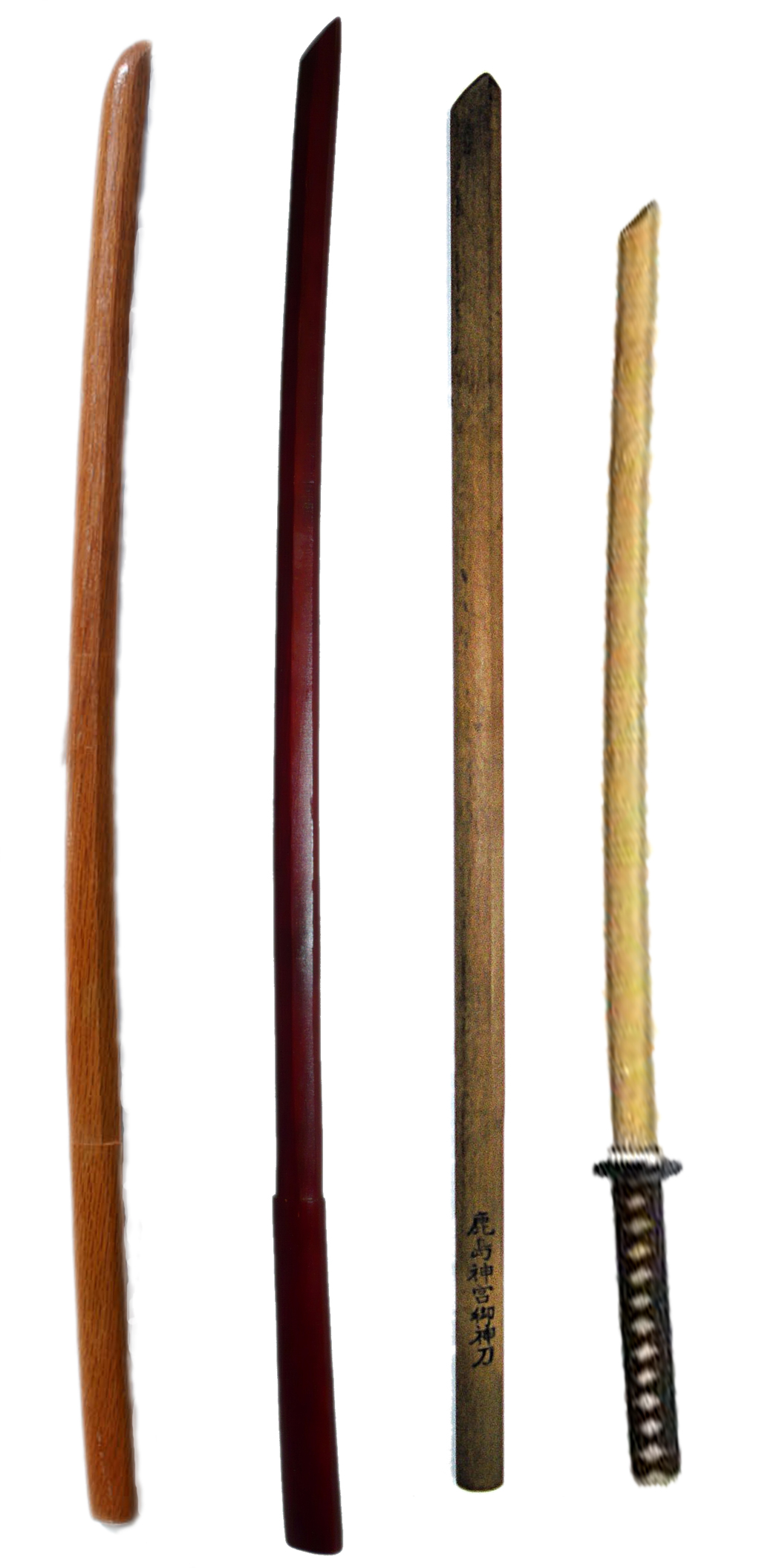
Various styles of bokken

The bokken is used as an inexpensive and relatively safe substitute for a real sword in several martial arts such as aikido, kendo, iaido, kenjutsu, and jodo. Its simple wooden construction demands less care and maintenance than a katana. Training with a bokken does not carry the same mortal risk associated with that of a sharp metal sword, both for the user and other practitioners nearby.

While its use has several advantages over use of a live edged weapon, it can still be deadly, and any training with a bokken should be done with due care. Injuries occurring from bokken are very similar to those caused by clubs and similar battering weapons, and include compound fractures, ruptured organs, and other such blunt force injuries. In some ways, a bokken can be more dangerous, as the injuries caused are often unseen and inexperienced practitioners may underestimate the risk of harm.

It is not a sparring weapon, but is intended to be used in kata, and to acclimate the student to the feel of a real sword. For sparring, a bamboo shinai is typically used instead, for obvious safety reasons.

In 2003, the All Japan Kendo Federation (AJKF) introduced a set of basic exercises using a bokutō called Bokutō Ni Yoru Kendō Kihon-waza Keiko-hō. This form of practice is intended primarily for kendo practitioners up to Nidan ranking, but can be beneficial for all kendo students.

Suburitō (素振り刀) are bokken designed for use in suburi. Suburi (素振り), literally "bare swinging," are solo cutting exercises. Suburitō are thicker and heavier than normal bokken and users of suburitō must therefore develop both strength and technique. Their weight makes them unsuitable for paired practice and solo forms. Miyamoto Musashi's bokken made of an oar in his legendary duel with Sasaki Kojiro was presumably a suburitō-sized bokken.

As late as 2015, bokken were issued to the Los Angeles Police Mounted Unit for use as batons.

== Types ==
Bokken can be made to represent any style of weapon required such as nagamaki, nodachi, yari, naginata, kama, etc. The most widely used styles are:

- daitō or tachi (katana-sized), long sword
- shōtō or kodachi or wakizashi bō (wakizashi-sized), short sword
- tantō bō (tantō-sized)
- suburitō can be made in daitō and shōtō sizes

Various koryu (traditional Japanese martial arts) have their own distinct styles of bokken which can vary slightly in length, tip shape, or in whether or not a tsuba (hilt guard) is added.

The All Japan Kendo Federation specify the dimensions of bokken for use in the modern kendo kata, called Nippon kendo kata.

- Tachi: Total length, approx. 102 cm (40 in); tsuka (handle) approx. 24 cm (9.4 in).
- Kodachi: Total length, approx. 55 cm (22 in); tsuka (handle) approx. 14 cm (5.5 in).

Bokken are traditionally composed of red oak or white oak. White oak varieties are slightly more expensive and prestigious. Other common tree varieties used included ebony, biwa, and sunuke in Japan, and hickory, persimmon, ironwood, and walnut for trees native to the Americas. Biwa trees were used at least partially due to a folk superstition that wounds inflicted by biwa wood would never heal.

== See also ==
- Aiki-ken
- Iaido
- Jō
- Kendo and kenjutsu
- Kinomichi
- Waster
