= Geography of kendo =

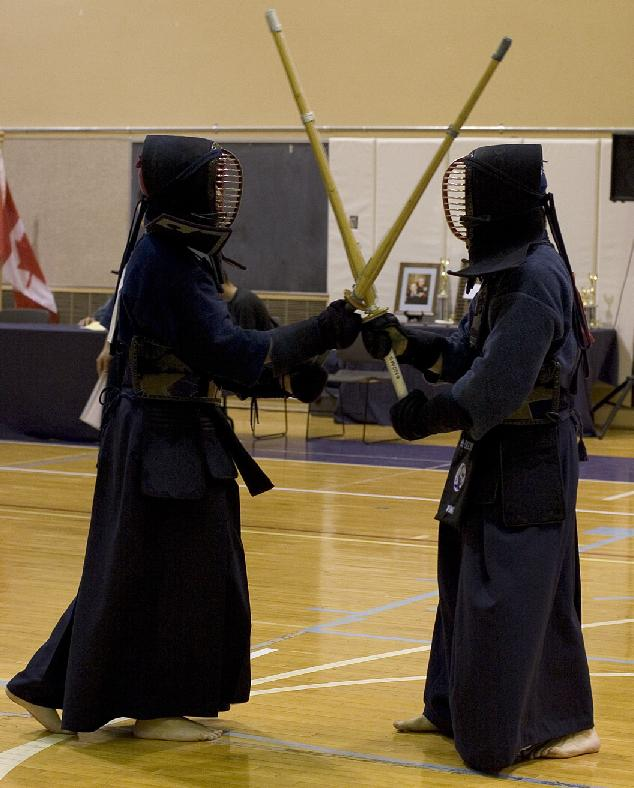
Kendo is practiced worldwide.

Kendo originated in Japan, but is today practiced worldwide.

The size and depth of kendo skill varies widely from country to country. Some countries have few kendo practitioners, while Japan has several million.

Generally, kendo has stronger traditions in countries with strong historical ties to Japan, like Korea and Taiwan, as well as countries with large Japanese immigrant communities such as the United States, Canada and Brazil. While the term kendo is used all over the world, the term Kumdo is used in Korea.

== International organisations ==
The following international organisations administer, manage, promote, or have an interest in the development of kendo.

- The International Kendo Federation (FIK) is the international federation of most national and regional kendo organisations. The FIK was established in 1970 to provide a link between the All Japan Kendo Federation and the developing international kendo community. Seventeen national or regional federations were the founding affiliates. The number of affiliated and recognised organisations has increased over the years to 57 (as of May 2015).

FIK affiliated national and regional kendo organisations are listed on the FIK website.

The FIK has conducted the World Kendo Championships, every three years since it was established. The international competition is contested by individual and team representatives of the FIK affiliates.

- Dai Nippon Butoku Kai (DNBK) was established in Kyoto, Japan, in 1953. Today, the new axiom of DNBK stresses preservation of classical martial arts tradition and the promotion of education and community service through martial arts training.
- International Martial Arts Federation (IMAF) was established in Kyoto, Japan, in 1952. Among the objectives of IMAF are the expansion of interest in Japanese martial arts, the establishment of communication, friendship, understanding and harmony among member chapters, the development of the minds and bodies of members, and the promotion of global understanding and personal growth.
- Zen Nihon Sōgō-Budō Renmei (ZNSBR) The organization known as the Zen Nihon Sōgō-Budō Renmei (All Japan [Comprehensive] Budō Federation or SōBuRen) has as its mission the preservation of all Japanese martial arts. This includes (pre-Meiji) Nihon koryū bujutsu/bugei and (post-Meiji) gendai budō. We operate under the protection of the Japanese Imperial House as an entity that protects Japanese culture. The organization was created by Suzuki Masafumi-kanchō in 1969. After the passing of its founder, Ishikawa Takashi-kanchō, Toyama-ryū iaidō hanshi 9th dan and jūkendo hanshi 9th dan, replaced him as President of the Zen Nihon Sōgō-Budō Renmei.

== National and regional organisations ==
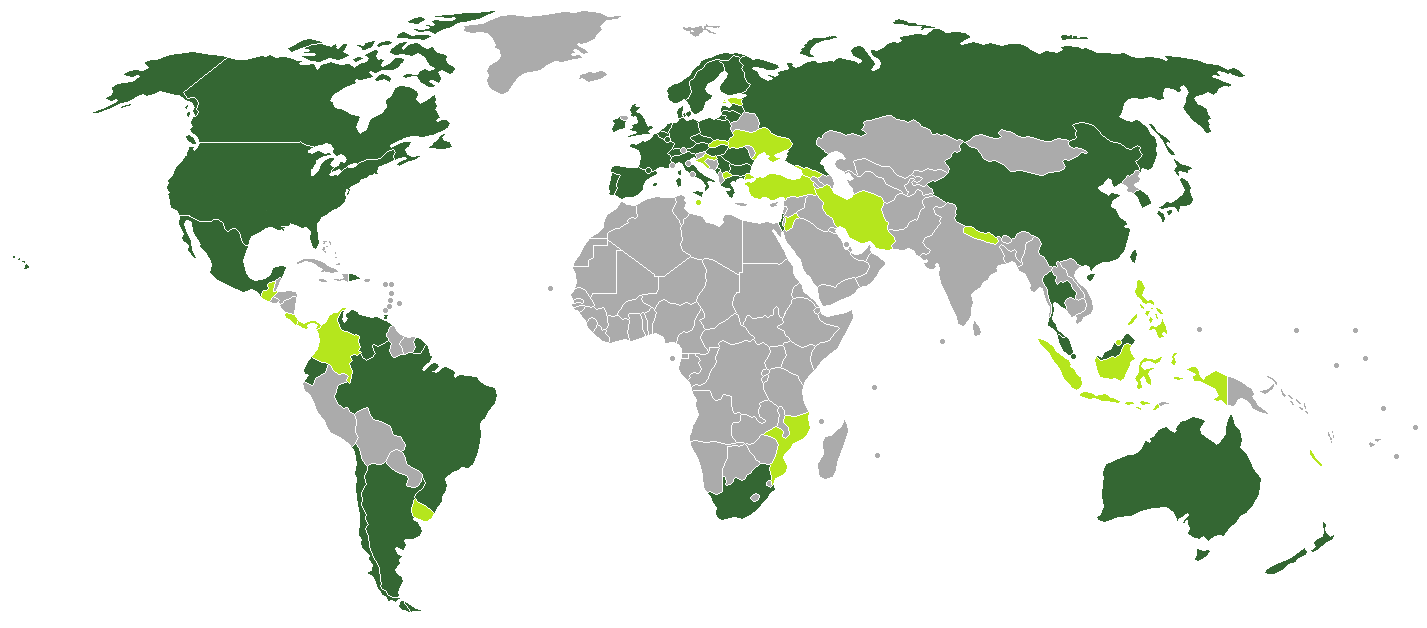
Distribution of kendo federations. In dark green federations recognized by the FIK. In light green federations recognized by other agencies or in recognition process by the FIK.

Many national and regional organisations manage and promote kendo, some are affiliated to international kendo organisations, while other organisations are independent of international kendo organisations.

=== Africa ===
- South Africa Kendo Federation
- Tunisian Kendo League

The SAKF and the TKL are the only two federations recognized by The International Kendo Federation (FIK) in Africa, but there is also kendo activity in Mozambique, Madagascar and Malawi.

- Malawi: Kendo was introduced to Malawi in 1992 when a Japanese volunteer took on a group of local children as his students. The Kendo Association of Malawi was formed in 1999 and has seen significant growth in recent years. The Kendo Association of Malawi works closely with the Embassy of Japan in Malawi to promote kendo as a sport and to encourage cultural exchange and interaction between the peoples of the two nations. The majority of the Kendo Associations activities take place in Blantyre and the Blantyre Youth Center. On 31 March 2024 The Kendo Association established a Kendo club in the capital city, Lilongwe, at Kamuzu Institute for Sports, and now weekly training sessions are held in both cities. Furthermore, at least two local tournaments are organized each year, which are patronized by the general public and the Japanese community in Malawi.

=== Americas ===
==== Central America ====
Kendo in Guatemala started in 1992. The Guatemalan Kendo Association was founded in 1992. It consists of about 150 kenshi, is part of the CLAK (Latin American Kendo Confederation), and holds Kendo championships annually.

==== North America ====
- Canadian Kendo Federation (CKF) consists of over 55 member clubs. Clubs belong to CKF directly, although they may also belong to a regional federation. Such federations exist in British Columbia and Ontario.
- Federación Mexicana de Kendo (FMK) Mexican Kendo Federation, consists of 13 regional associations.
- In the United States, several organisations promote kendo:
  - All United States Kendo Federation; (AUSKF) consists of 14 regional members. The regional members comprise a minimum of three kendo clubs, each with a minimum of 50 members. Individual people or clubs cannot be members of the AUSKF.
  - Many universities also host collegiate clubs that promote kendo among student communities.
  - * The University of California, Los Angeles hosts an annual intercollegiate Yuhihai tournament for undergraduate students to compete.
  - Hawaii Kendo Federation (HKF) operates separately from the All United States Kendo Federation.
- Puerto Rico: Is represented by the Federación Puertorriqueña de Kendo e Iaido. Puerto Rico has sports autonomy so the federation does not fall under the AUSKF.

==== South America ====
In South America, the practice of Kendo has existed since the arrival of Japanese immigrants as early as 1908. Since then and with Brazil as its centre, kendo has spread over South America. Now kendo practitioners and kendo federations exist in many countries in South America such as: Brazil, Argentina, Venezuela, Colombia, Ecuador, Peru, Uruguay, Aruba and Chile.

At the December 2006 meeting of the International Kendo Federation (FIK) held in Taiwan, the South American Kendo Confederation (CSK) was discussed and voted upon, as a result the Confederation was admitted as an FIK affiliate.

Argentina, Aruba, Chile, Brazil and Venezuela are affiliated with the FIK.

The next Latin American Kendo Championship was supposed to be held in May 2020 in São Paulo, Brazil, but was suspended until further notice due to the ongoing pandemic.

- Federación Argentina de Kendo (FAK) Kendo federation associated to the International Kendo Federation in Argentina.
- Federación de Kendo de la República Argentina (FKRA)
- Brazilian Kendo Federation;
- Kendo in Chile started in 1990. The Chilean Kendo Federation was founded in 1997 and became a member of the FIK in 2003. It consists of about 250 kenshi, is part of the CSK (South American Kendo Confederation), and holds Kendo championships annually.
- Kendo in Ecuador started in 1999 in the facilities of the Japanese School of Quito.
- Kendo y Iaido en Uruguay
- Uruguayan Association of Kendō and Iaidō (AUKI).
- Ken Zen Dojo de Venezuela was founded in 1990 under the auspice of Ken Zen Dojo of New York.

=== Asia ===
- Hong Kong Kendo Association (香港劍道協會)
- Malaysia Kendo Association (MKA)
- Singapore Kendo Club
- Kendo India Federation (KIF)
- Indonesian Kendo Association
- Shinbukan: Iran Kendo and Iaido Association
- Israel Kendo and Budo Federation (IKBF) The federation represents Kendo, Iaido and Jodo in Israel.
- All Japan Kendo Federation (in Japanese) (AJKF or ZNKR) AJKF was founded in 1952, immediately following the restoration of Japanese independence after the second World War and the subsequent lift of the ban on 'martial arts' in Japan.
- Korea Kumdo Association (in Korean)
- Chinese Kendo Network; (中国剑道网) This group represents Kendo, Iaido, and Jodo in Mainland China.
- Macau SAR Kendo Associations Union (澳門特區劍道連盟)
- Republic of China (Chinese Taipei) Kendo Federation (中華民國劍道協會)
- Kuwait Kendo Dojo
- Thailand Kendo Club; (in Thai)
- Brunei Kendo Alliance

=== Europe ===
The European Kendo Federation (EKF) is member of International Kendo Federation (FIK), which 35 countries/regions belong to, also promotes jodo and iaido. European kendo championships have been held since 1974. Championships are held every year that there is no world championship. Some national organisations are affiliated to EKF, while other organisations are independent of EKF.

- Armenia Kendo is promoted by the National Kendo Federation of Armenia.
- Austria The Austrian Kendo Association; was founded in 1985.
- Belgium Kendo is promoted by All Belgium Kendo Federation (A.B.K.F.).
- Bulgaria Kendo is promoted by Bulgarian Kendo Federation (B.K.F).
- Croatia Kendo is promoted by Hrvatski Kendo Savez (H.K.S.).
- Czech Republic Kendo is promoted by Czech Kendo Federation (C.K.F).
- Denmark: Two organisations uphold different approaches to kendo.
  - Danish Kendo Federation (DKF) which is affiliated with the International Kendo Federation (FIK).
  - Danish Kendo Society which is independent of European Kendo Federation (EKF) and other international kendo organisations.
- Estonia Kendo is promoted by Eesti Kendoliit.
- Finland Kendo is promoted Finnish Kendo Association.
- France After the end of World War II, many masters of kendo visited France and introduced kendo in the 1950s. The first French kendo championship was held in 1959. Comité National de Kendo
- Georgia (country) Kendo is promoted by the Georgian Kendo Association.
- Germany Deutscher Kendobund e.V
- Greece is promoted by the Hellenic Kendo Iaido Naginata Federation.
- Hungary Kendo is promoted by Hungarian Kendo Federation (HKF).
- Italy: Kendo is promoted by two organisations:
  - Confederazione Italiana Kendo; (CIK) which is affiliated with European Kendo Federation (EKF) and, thus, with International Kendo Federation (FIK)
  - Federazione Italiana Kendo(FIK) which is affiliated with Zen Nihon Sogo-Bugo Renmei
- Ireland Kendo is promoted by Kendo Na h-Éireann, Irish Kendo Federation.
- Latvia Kendo is promoted by Latvian Kendo Federation (LKF).
- Lithuania Kendo is promoted by Lithuanian Kendo Association (LKA).
- Luxembourg Shobukai Kendo Luxembourg (SKL)
- Malta Kendo is promoted by the Maltese Kendo Federation Members of the European Kendo Federation.
- Moldova Kendo is promoted by Moldovan Kendo Federation.
- Montenegro Kendo is promoted by Montenegrin Kendo Federation .
- Netherlands Kendo is promoted by Dutch Kendo Renmei (NKR).
- North Macedonia Kendo is promoted by Macedonian Kendo Iaido Federation (MKIF)
- Norway Kendo is promoted by the Norwegian Kendo Federation which will soon be joining The Norwegian Martial arts Federation (Norges Kampsport forbund).
- Poland Kendo is promoted by Polish Kendo Federation.
- Portugal Kendo is promoted by Associação Portuguesa de Kendo (APK), which is affiliated with the European Kendo Federation and the International Kendo Federation.
- Romania Kendo is promoted by the Kendo Department of the Contact Martial Arts Federation in Romania.
- Russia Moscow Kendo Association
- Serbia Kendo is promoted by the Serbian Kendo Federation in Serbia.
- Slovakia Kendo is promoted by the Slovenská kendo federácia in Slovak republic.
- Spain Kendo is promoted by the Real Federacion Española de Judo y Deportes Asociados.
- Sweden: Two organisations uphold different approaches to kendo.
  - Swedish Kendo Federation (SKF) which is affiliated with the International Kendo Federation (FIK).
  - Tokugawa Kendo Federation which is independent of European Kendo Federation (EKF) and other international kendo organisations.
- Switzerland The Swiss Kendo & Iaido SJV/ASJ was founded in 1967.
- Turkey Kendo is promoted by the Turkish Kendo Association in Turkey, Ankara Kendo Iaido Association in Ankara.
- Ukraine Kendo is promoted by the Ukrainian Kendo Federation.
- United Kingdom: Several organisations promote Kendo in the UK.
  - British Kendo Association, which is affiliated with the International Kendo Federation.
  - British Kendo Renmei which is independent of European Kendo Federation (EKF) and other international kendo organisations.

=== Oceania ===
- Australian Kendo Renmei (AKR) grew from the beginning of kendo in Australia in the 1960s, is a founding member of the FIK (formerly the IKF) and remains affiliated. Australian Kendo Championships were first held in the 1970s and with a few gaps in the early years has been held in Australia annually since.

The AKR also partners with Australian University Sport Inc., to conduct an annual national kendo championship for university students. In 2014, 76 University student kendo players represented nine universities from all over Australia.

- The New Zealand Kendo Federation.

=== Pacific Ocean ===
Hawaii Kendo Federation (HKF) The Hawaii Budo Kyokai was established in 1947 (even before the All Japan Kendo Federation) and was renamed Hawaii Kendo Federation in 1955. The HKF consists of 16 dojo practicing kendo and iaido on the islands of Oahu, Hawaii, Kauai and Maui. The HKF is an affiliate organisation of the FIK.
