= European Kendo Federation =

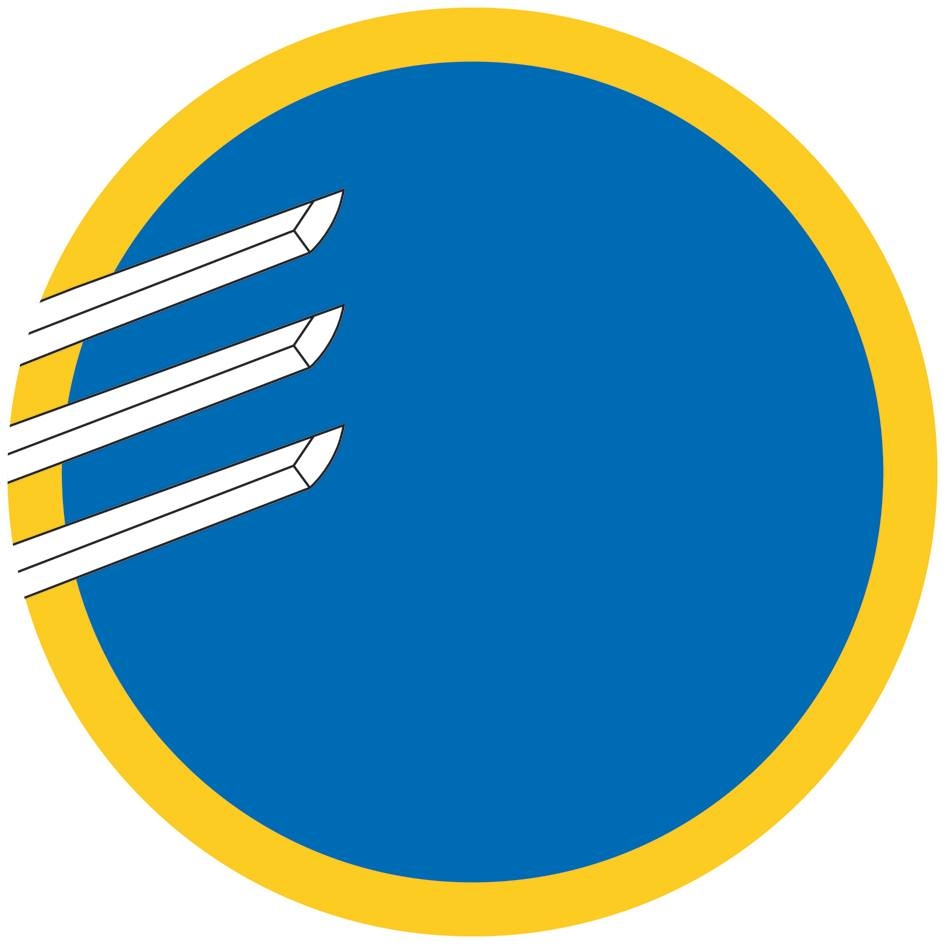
- Formation: 1969
- Type: Sports organization
- Members: ~21,000 (2025)
- President: (Austria) Dieter Hauck
- Vice President: (Greece) Spyridon Drosoulakis
- Key people: (Republic of Ireland) Kathryn Cassidy (Italy) Donatella Castelli (France) Jean-Pierre Labru
- Affiliations: International Kendo Federation
- Website: www.ekf-eu.com

The European Kendo Federation (EKF) is the governing body for Kendo in Europe, overseeing its development, competitions, and regulations across its member countries. It is the member of the International Kendo Federation which is responsible for the European zone. The EKF is the overall organization for the Japanese martial arts Kendo, Jōdō and Iaido in Europe.

Established in 1969, the EKC has significantly contributed to the development and popularity of kendo throughout the continent.

== European Kendo Championships ==
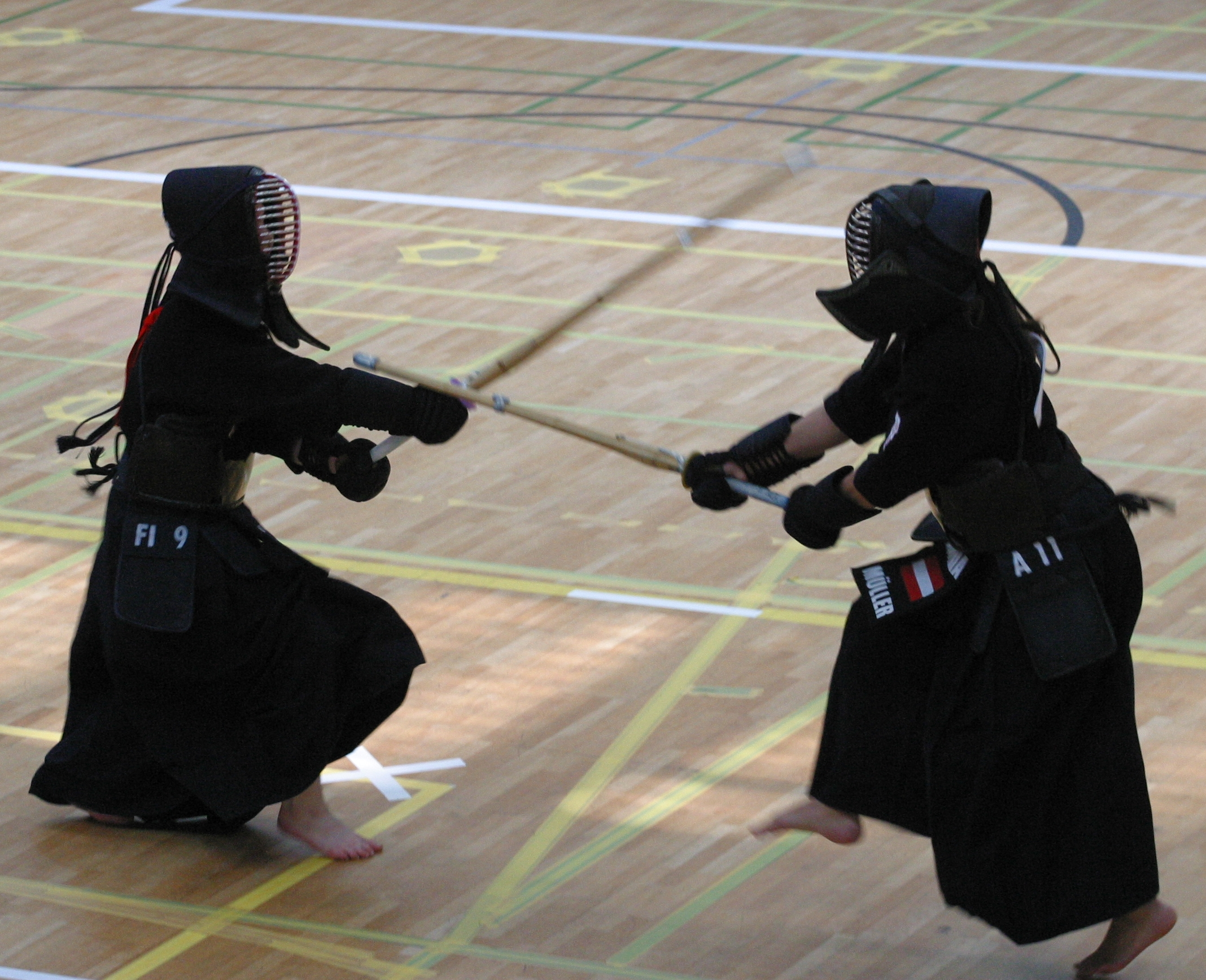
European Championships in Bern, 2005

The European Kendo Championships are a premier event organized by the EKF, serving as the primary platform for kendo practitioners across Europe.

The championships are typically held annually, except in years when the World Kendo Championships occur. The EKC encompasses six divisions: Men's Team, Women's Team, Junior Team, Men's Individual, Women's Individual, and Junior Boys and Girls Individual. Team matches feature five members from each team, while junior team matches consist of three members per team.

Historically, France has been a dominant force in the EKC, particularly in the Men's Team division, securing numerous titles over the years. However, other nations have also demonstrated strong performances, contributing to the dynamic and competitive nature of the championships.

== Member countries ==
=== Europe ===
- Austria: Austrian Kendo Association (AKA)
- Belgium: All Belgium Kendo Federation (ABKF)
- Bulgaria: Bulgarian Kendo Federation (BKF)
- Croatia: Croatian Kendo Association (CKA)
- Germany: Deutscher Kendo Bund e.V. (DKenB)
- Denmark: Danish Kendo Federation (DKF)
- Estonia: Estonian Kendo Federation (EsKF)
- Finland: Finnish Kendo Association (FKA)
- France: FFJDA – Comité National de Kendo & DR (CNKDR)
- Georgia: Georgian Kendo Association (GKA)
- Greece: Hellenic Kendo Iaido Naginata Federation (HKINF)
- Ireland: Kendo na hÉireann (KnhÉ)
- Italy: Confederazione Italiana Kendo (CIK)
- Latvia: Latvian Kendo Federation (LKF)
- Lithuania: Lithuanian Kendo Association (LKA)
- Luxembourg: Fédération Luxembourgeoise des Arts Martiaux (FLAM)
- North Macedonia: Macedonian Kendo - Iaido Federation (MKIF)
- Malta: Maltese Kendo Federation (MKF)
- Moldova: The Kendo Federation of the Republic of Moldova (MDA)
- Montenegro: Montenegrin Kendo Federation (KSCG)
- Norway: Norges Kendo Komitee (NKK)
- Netherlands: Nederlandse Kendo Renmei (NKR)
- Poland: Polski Zwiazek Kendo (PZK)
- Portugal: Associação Portuguesa de Kendo (APK)
- United Kingdom: British Kendo Association (BKA)
- Czech Republic: Czech Kendo Federation (CKF)
- Romania: Asociatia Cluburilor de Kendo, Iaido si Jodo (ACKIJ)
- Serbia: Serbian Kendo Federation (SKF)
- Slovakia: Slovak Kendo Federation (SKF)
- Slovenia: Kendo Federation of Slovenia (KFSLO)
- Spain: Real Federación Española de Judo y Deportes Asociados (RFEJYDA)
- Sweden: Svenska Kendoförbundet (SB&K)
- Switzerland: Swiss Kendo + Iaido SJV / FSJ (SKI)
- Turkey: Turkish Kendo Association (TKC)
- Ukraine: Ukraine Kendo Federation (UKF)
- Hungary: Hungarian Kendo, Iaido and Jodo Federation (HKF)

=== Africa ===
- Madagascar: Federation Malagasy de Kendo (FMKDA)
- Morocco: Fédération Royale Marocaine d’Aïkido, Iaido et Arts Martiaux (FRMAIAM)
- Mozambique: Ass. de Kendo e Iaido de Mocambique (AKIMO)
- South Africa: South African Kendo Federation (SAKF)
- Tunisia: Association Sportive de Kendo (ASK)

=== Asia ===
- Israel: Israel Kendo & Budo Federation (IKBF)
- Jordan: Jordan Kendo Federation (JKF)
- Kazakhstan: Kazakhstan Kendo and Iaido Federation (KKIF)

=== Suspended members ===
- Russia: Russian Kendo Federation (RKF) (Note: In May 2022, the EKF condemned Russia's invasion of Ukraine, describing it as a violation of law and human morality, and endorsed suspending the Russian Kendo Federation from its membership, emphasizing that kendo promotes peace and personal development.)

== See also ==
- All Japan Kendo Federation
- All United States Kendo Federation
- National Kendo Federation of Armenia
