= European Championships Jodo 2009 =

The European Championships Jodo 2009 were held on 17 and 18 November 2009 in Mierlo, the Netherlands.

== Organisation ==
The European Championships where hosted by the Netherlands Kendo Renmei (N.K.R.), with help from the European Kendo Federation (E.K.F.) and technical assistance of the All Japan Kendo Federation (A.J.K.F.).

== Participating countries ==
Austria, Belgium, Finland, France, Germany, Greece, Hungary, Israel, Italy, Jordan, Netherlands, Norway, Poland, Portugal, Russia, Sweden, Switzerland, United Kingdom.

== Results ==
=== Mudan (none Dan) ===
Competitors: 21
Champion: Michal Szczepanžski, Poland
Vice-champion: Jesper Waldestal, Sweden
3rd place: Adam Majchrzak, Poland
3rd place: Matthew Sykes-Gelder, Switzerland
Fighting Spirit Award: Zoltan Kozar, Hungary

=== Shodan (1st Dan) ===
Competitors: 24
Champion: Alexander Egunov, Russia.
Vice-champion: Igor Chursin, Russia.
3rd place: Yvonne Lauper, Switzerland.
3rd place: Roberto Milana, Italy.
Fighting Spirit Award: Carl-Johan Henriksso, Sweden.

=== Nidan (2nd Dan) ===
Competitors: 16
Champion: Jonnathan Vandenbussche, Belgium.
Vice-champion: Liviu Vlad, Belgium.
3rd place: Felix Klein, Germany
3rd place: Daniel Behrendt, Switzerland.
Fighting Spirit Award: Luc Quaglia, France.

=== Sandan (3rd Dan) ===
Competitors: 23
Champion: Aurelien Nacrour, United Kingdom.
Vice-champion: Lukasz Machura, Poland.
3rd place: Daniel Silk, United Kingdom.
3rd place: Sida Yin, Sweden.
Fighting Spirit Award: Konstadinos Matzaras, Greece.

=== Yondan (4th Dan) ===
Competitors: 16
Champion: Kevin Groos, Netherlands.
Vice-champion: Robert Voelkmann, Germany.
3rd place: Katja Niklaus, Switzerland.
3rd place: Bruno Lehmann, Switzerland.
Fighting Spirit Award: Gaetano Dellisanti, Italy.

=== Godan (5th Dan) ===
Competitors: 6
Champion: Andy Watson, United Kingdom.
Vice-champion: Hans Pegtel, Netherlands.
3rd place: Bernhard Merkel, Germany.
3rd place: Harry Jones, United Kingdom.
Fighting Spirit Award: Jean-Marc Billaudeau, France.

=== Teams ===
Countries: 17
Champion: Germany
Vice-champion: Poland
3rd place: Switzerland
3rd place: France
