= AJKF =

AJKF may refer to:

- All Japan Kickboxing Federation, the Japan-based past sanctioning and promoting body of professional kickboxing
- All Japan Kendo Federation, the organization which controls kendo, one of the Japanese swords martial arts
