= All United States Kendo Federation =

National governing body for kendo in US

- Formation: 1994
- Type: Sports organization
- President: Michio Kajitani
- Vice president: Yuji Onitsuka
- Affiliations: International Kendo Federation
- Website: auskf.org

The All United States Kendo Federation (AUSKF) is the national governing body for kendo in the United States. (Note: Except for Hawaii, the Hawaii Kendo Federation (HKF) is an independent organization from the AUSKF.) Established in 1994, it oversees the practice, promotion, and development of kendo, Iaido, and Jōdō across the country. The AUSKF is affiliated with the International Kendo Federation (FIK) and represents the United States in international kendo competitions.

== Overview ==
The AUSKF comprises 14 regional member federations, each coordinating training programs, grading examinations, and tournaments within their respective areas. These regional federations work under the guidance of the AUSKF to promote and develop kendo at the local level.

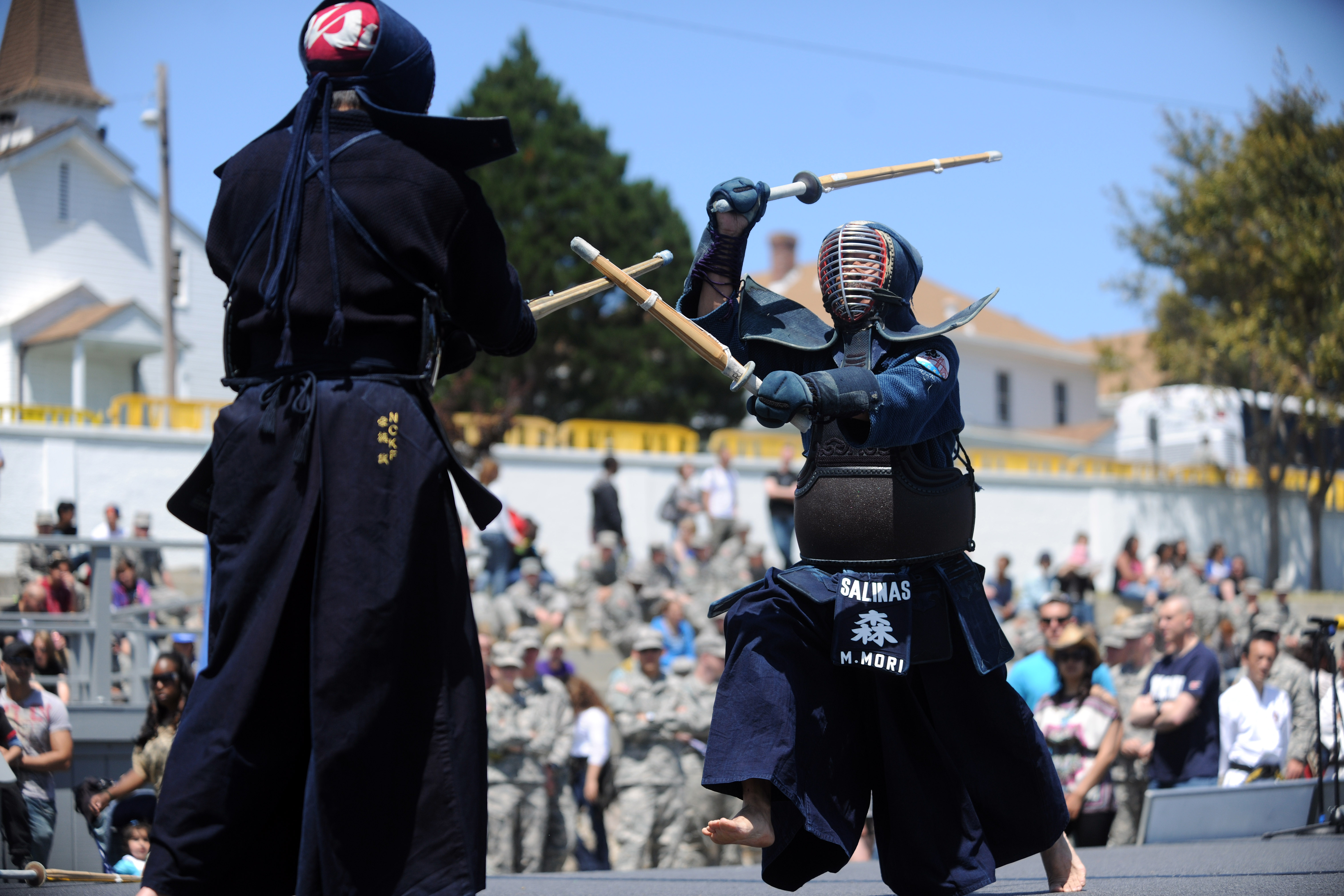
Kendo Showcase in Presidio of Monterey, California, 2012.

As a non-profit organization, the AUSKF organizes national tournaments, trains U.S. teams for international competitions, and provides promotional examination opportunities for higher ranks. It also interfaces with the International Kendo Federation (FIK) and offers support programs to regional member federations, including providing guest instructors, examiners, and arranging seminars with expert sensei from foreign countries.

The federation promotes traditional Japanese martial arts values and works to expand kendo's reach in the U.S. by supporting dojos, hosting seminars, and encouraging participation at all skill levels. Through these efforts, the AUSKF aims to cultivate the mind and body, foster courtesy and honor, and contribute to the development of culture and promotion of peace and prosperity among all peoples.

Financially, the AUSKF reported revenues of $683,540 and expenses of $613,374 for the fiscal year ending December 2023, with total assets amounting to $1,014,357.

== Championships ==
The All United States Kendo Championships are held triennially and feature individual and team competitions across various divisions, including men's, women's, and junior categories. The event has been hosted in various locations, such as San Jose, California, in 2017, and Rochester, Michigan, in 2023. Kendo practitioners from regional federations compete to showcase their skills, with the tournament serving as a premier platform for high-level competition.

== See also ==
- All Japan Kendo Federation
- European Kendo Federation
