= International Martial Arts Federation =

Japanese organization

International Martial Arts Federation 国際武道院・国際武道連盟 Kokusai Budoin Kokusai Budo Renmei
- Formation: 1951
- Type: Sports organization
- Headquarters: Tokyo, Japan
- Members: Unknown.
- Official language: English and Japanese
- President: Mr. Yasuhisa Tokugawa
- Website: International Martial Arts Federation https://www.imaf.com/

Kokusai Budoin, International Martial Arts Federation (国際武道院・国際武道連盟, Kokusai Budoin Kokusai Budo Renmei) (IMAF) is the oldest continuously operating Japanese organization promoting international Budō. The organization, founded in 1951, has headquarters in Tokyo, Japan and is a member of the United Nations Department of Economic and Social Affairs.

IMAF has branches in 17 countries.

IMAF organizes world Budo galas, congresses, international training, maintains historical records on Budo and issues the magazine, named Gendo Newsletter.

== Purposes ==
The International Martial Arts Federation (IMAF) is dedicated to the promotion and development of martial arts worldwide.

Among other objectives of IMAF are the expansion of interest in Japanese martial arts, the establishment of communication, friendship, understanding and harmony among member chapters, the development of the minds and bodies of members, and the promotion of global understanding and personal growth.

== History ==
The International Martial Arts Federation (IMAF) was founded in 1951 by a group of some of Japan's most prominent martial arts practitioners, including:

- Kyuzo Mifune, Hanshi, Meijin Judo
- Kazuo Ito, Hanshi, Meijin Judo
- Takasue Ito, Hanshi, Meijin Judo
- Shizuya Sato, Hanshi Nihon Jujutsu and Hanshi Judo
- Nakayama Hakudo, Meijin Kendo
- Hiromasa Takano, Meijin Kendo
- Hironori Otsuka, Meijin Karatedo
- Gogen Yamaguchi, Hanshi Karatedo
- Hirokazu Kanazawa, Hanshi Karatedo
- Kazuo Sakai, Hanshi Karatedo
- Katsuo Yamaguchi, Meijin Iaido
- Taizaburo Nakamura, Hanshi Iaido
- Kisshomaru Ueshiba, Aikikai Aikido, and son of the founder of Aikido,
- Morihei Ueshiba was also a founding member of IMAF.

The first President (chairman) was Prince Kaya Tsunenori (uncle of Emperor Hirohito, former lieutenant general in the Imperial Army) from 1952 to 1965, and was followed Prince Higashikuni (the first post World War II Prime Minister, the only member of the Japanese Imperial Family to have held this post). IMAF, then known as the National Japan Health Association sponsored the first, large-scale, public, post World War II martial arts demonstration in Japan in Hibiya Park in downtown Tokyo in February 1952. In 1973, Sueo Kiyoura was appointed the Third President of IMAF. He was a well-known and influential businessman and son of Keigo Kiyoura the 13th prime minister of Japan. In 1983, Gunzo Fukuhara was appointed the fourth President of IMAF and was a former Cabinet Minister of Japan. In 1986, Shinsaku Hogen was appointed as the 5th President of IMAF. He served as the Japanese Ambassador to India and Deputy Foreign Minister.

The current president of Kokusai Budoin, International Martial Arts Federation (IMAF) is Yasuhisa Tokugawa, the great-grandson of the 15th and final shōgun of Japan, Tokugawa Yoshinobu (1837–1913). He was also the Chief Priest for the Yasukuni Shrine in Tokyo from 2013 to 2018.

== Ranking System ==
The International Martial Arts Federation (IMAF) use the shōgō system where the levels are renshi (錬士), kyōshi (教士), and hanshi (範士). The most venerated level is hanshi.

== Divisions ==
The International Martial Arts Federation (IMAF) has seven divisions and licensed instructors in following divisions:

- Aikido
- Iaidō
- Judo
- Jujutsu
- Karatedo
- Kendo
- Kobudo

There was a schism in IMAF Europe which led to a separate non-affiliated group with a similar name being formed in 1983 by Minoru Mochizuki,. The issue was raised to the Japanese courts which in 1987, ruled against Mochizuki and separation---IMAF Europe is not affiliated with Japan. In England there was a further divided in IMAF UK in 2005 which led to the formation of two affiliated bodies, UK IMAF and IMAF GB which changed its name to the United Kingdom Budo Federation.

== Aikido Division ==
The Aikido Division was founded in 1954. The position of Aikido Division has been held by the world's foremost aikido authorities. Kisshomaru Ueshiba, son of the founder of aikido Morihei Ueshiba, and late director of the Aikikai Hombu. He was succeeded by Kenji Tomiki (founder of Shodokan Aikido), Minoru Mochizuki (10th dan Aikido), and Gozo Shioda (10th dan Aikido, founder of Yoshinkan Aikido). The current Division heads are Takeji Tomita and Shinji Tsutsui.

== Kendo Division ==
The International Martial Arts Federation (IMAF) defines Kendo as 'the way of the sword', it is a modern martial art based on ancient Kenjutsu (the art of swordsmanship).

Representatives from the kendo division teaches and holds international exhibitions in kendo. Furthermore, highranking Japanese masters holds international seminars in kendo.

IMAF members demonstrated Nihon Kendo Kata at Kameido Katori Jinja on April 29, 2009. Originally, Nihon Kendo Kata was called Dai Nippon Teikoku Kendo Kata created in 1912 but was revised in 1912, 1917, 1933 and 1981. In 1933 the Dai Nippon Teikoku Kendo Kata was changed to the name 'Nihon Kendo Kata' and the last revision in 1981 was made by the All Japan Kendo Federation. A YouTube clip exists showing IMAF members demonstrating Nihon Kendo Kata.

== Iaido Division ==
The Iaido Division has been led by some of the greatest iaido figures, including Tsugiyoshi Ota, Meijin Iaido 10-dan, Katsuo Yamaguchi, Meijin Iaido 10-dan, Tadao Ochiai, Hanshi Iaido 10-dan, and Kenji Tose, Hanshi Iaido 10-dan. The Current division head is Kunikazu Yahagi Sensei.

== Karatedo Division ==
Some of the leading members of IMAF Karatedo division have been *Hironori Otsuka, Meijin Karatedo *Gogen Yamaguchi, Hanshi Karatedo and *Kazuo Sakai, Hanshi Karatedo. Most recently *Hirokazu Kanazawa, Hanshi Karatedo was on the IMAF board of directors. The Current Division heads are Tadanori Nobetsu Sensei, Goju Karate and Ikuo Higuchi Sensei, Shotokan Karate.
