= Australian Kendo Renmei =

- Jurisdiction: Australia
- Affiliation: International Kendo Federation
- (Australia)

The Australian Kendo Renmei Incorporated (AKR) is a non-profit Incorporated Association registered in Australia. It exists to provide governance, education and promotion of the arts as well as supporting its affiliates and being the interface between the arts, the International Kendo Federation and the public.

The AKR grew from the beginning of kendo in Australia in the 1960s, is a founding member of the International Kendo Federation (FIK) and remains affiliated to the FIK.

The AKR is recognised by the FIK and its international affiliates as the only governing body for kendo, iaido and jodo in Australia and the organisation in Australia which awards internationally recognised kyu and dan grades for kendo, iaido and jodo.

The Australian Kendo Championships were first held in the 1970s and with a few gaps in the early years have been held in Australia annually since then.
