= International Kendo Federation =

Sport federation

- Formation: 1970
- Type: Sports organization
- Headquarters: Tokyo, Japan
- Official language: English
- President: (Japan) Tadahiro Ajiro
- Vice Presidents: (Japan) Yukimichi Nakatani (United States) Yoshiteru Tagawa (Austria) Dieter Hauck (South Korea) Yong-Kyung Kim
- Website: www.kendo-fik.org

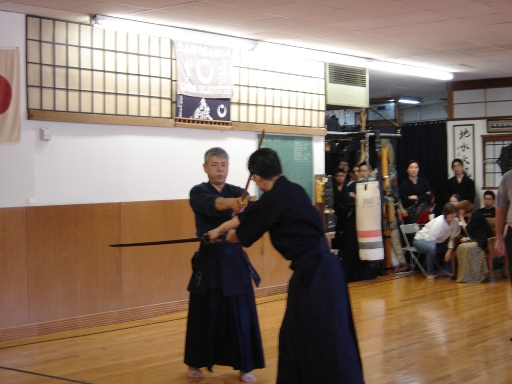
The forms of the Nihon Kendō Kata (日本剣道形) were finalized 1933 based on the Dai nihon Teikoku Kendo Kata, composed in 1912.

The International Kendo Federation (FIK) was founded in 1970. It is an international federation of national and regional kendo associations.

The FIK is a non-governmental organisation and its aim is to promote and popularise kendo, iaido and jōdō. Seventeen national or regional federations were the founding affiliates. The number of affiliated countries has increased over the years and as of October 2021, 62 countries/regions are FIK affiliates.

The FIK was accepted as a member of the Global Association of International Sports Federations (GAISF) in April 2006 and thus recognised as the peak world federation for kendo. As a consequence, the previous acronym of IKF was altered to FIK.

The head office of FIK is located in the All Japan Kendo Federation building in Minato-ku, Tokyo.

== Affiliated Federations ==
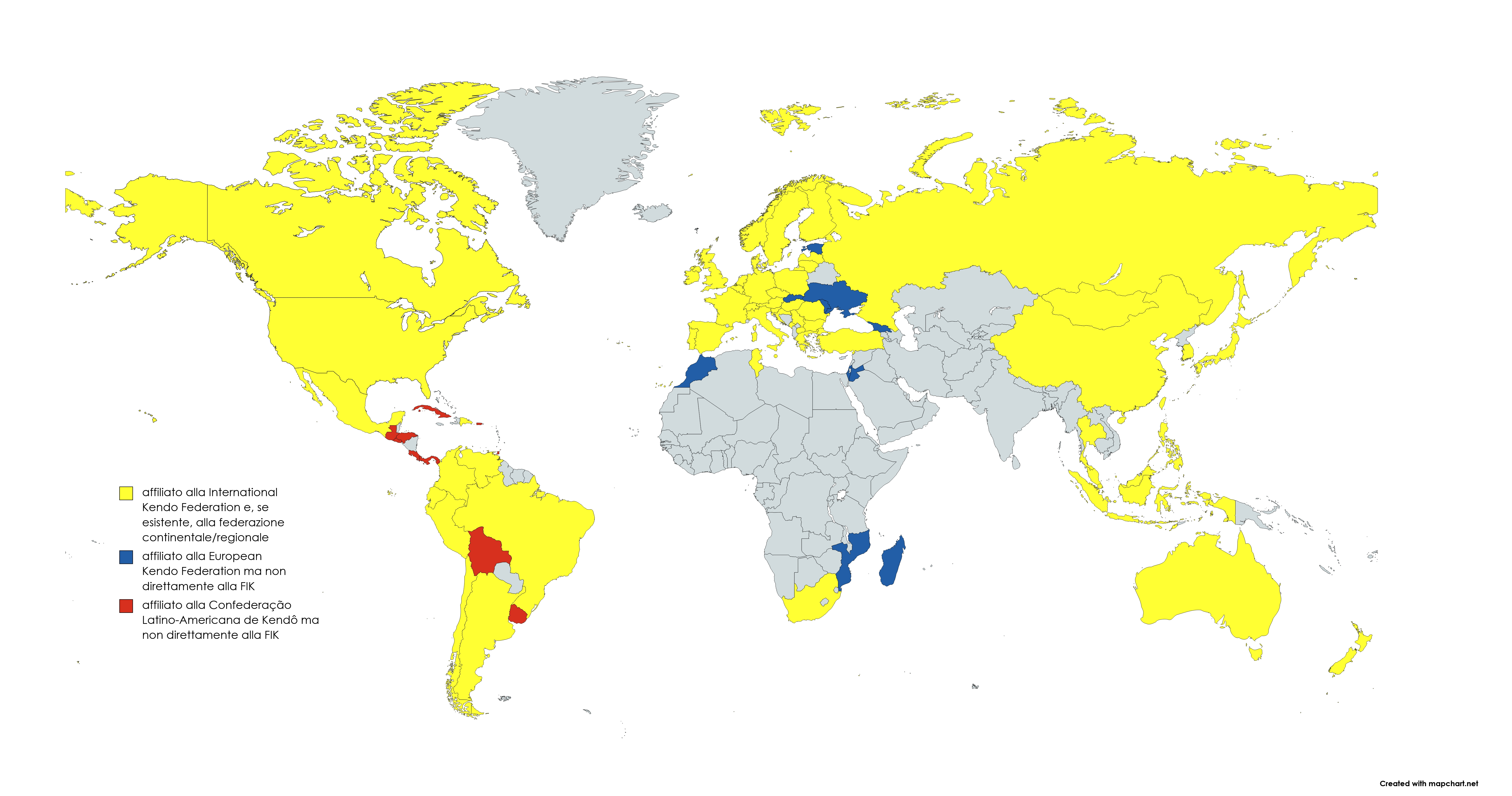
🟡 Affiliated with the FIK and, if any, with the continental or regional federation; 🔵 Affiliated with the European Kendo Federation but not directly with the FIK; 🔴 Affiliated with the Confederação Latino-Americana de Kendô but not directly with the FIK

=== Asian Zone ===
- Australia: Australian Kendo Renmei (AKR)
- China: Chinese Kendo Network (中国剑道网)
- South Korea: Korea Kendo Association (대한검도회) (KKA)
- Philippines: United Kendo Federation of the Philippines
- Japan: All Japan Kendo Federation (全日本剣道連盟, Zen Nihon Kendō Renmei) (AJKF / ZNKR)
- Hong Kong: The Kendo Association of Hong Kong, China (中國香港劍道協會)
- Indonesia: Indonesian Kendo Association
- Macau: Macau SAR Kendo Associations Union (澳門特區劍道連盟) (affiliated under special status)
- Malaysia: Malaysia Kendo Association (MKA)
- Mongolia: Mongolian Kendo Federation (MKF)
- New Zealand: New Zealand Kendo Federation (NZKF)
- Singapore: Singapore Kendo Club
- Taiwan / Chinese Taipei: Republic of China Kendo Federation (中華民國劍道協會)
- Thailand: Thailand Kendo Club
- Uzbekistan: Uzbekistan Kendo Federation (UzKF)

=== American Zone ===
🔴: affiliated with the Confederação Latino-Americana de Kendô but not directly with the FIK

- Canada: Canadian Kendo Federation (CKF)
- Confederação Latino-Americana de Kendô (CLAK / LAKC):
  - Argentina: Federacion Argentina de Kendo (FAK)
  - Aruba: Kendo Aruba/Bun Bu Itchi (affiliated under special status)
  - Bolivia: Association Boliviana de Kendo (ABK) 🔴 (guest)
  - Brazil: Confederação Brasileira de Kendo (CBK)
  - Chile: Chilean Kendo Federation
  - Colombia: Asociacion Colombiana de Kendo
  - Costa Rica: Asociación de Kendo Daigo Tsuji de Costa Rica 🔴
  - Cuba: Asociación Cubana de Kendo e Iaido (ACKI) 🔴 (guest)
  - Ecuador: Asociacion Ecuatoriana de Kendo
  - El Salvador: Federación Salvadoreña de Kendo e Iaido 🔴
  - Guatemala: Asociación de Kendo de Guatemala 🔴
  - Honduras: Asociación de Kendo e Iaido de Honduras 🔴 (guest)
  - Mexico: Federación Mexicana de Kendo (FMK)
  - Panama: All Panamá Kendo Dojo 🔴
  - Peru: Federacion Deportiva Nacional de Kendo del Peru
  - Puerto Rico: Federación Puertorriqueña de Kendo e Iaido 🔴 (guest)
  - Dominican Republic: Federation Dominicana de Kendo
  - Trinidad and Tobago: Kendo Federation of Trinidad & Tobago 🔴
  - Uruguay: Asociación Uruguaya de Kendo - Iaido (AUKI) 🔴
  - Venezuela: Federacion Venezolana de Kendo (FVK)
- Hawaii: Hawaii Kendo Federation (HKF)
- United States: All United States Kendo Federation (AUSKF)

=== European Zone ===
🔵: affiliated with the European Kendo Federation but not directly with the FIK

- European Kendo Federation (EKF):
  - Austria: Austrian Kendo Association (AKA)
  - Belgium: All Belgium Kendo Federation (ABKF)
  - Bulgaria: Bulgarian Kendo Federation (BKF)
  - Croatia: Croatian Kendo Association (CKA)
  - Germany: Deutscher Kendo Bund e. V. (DKenB)
  - Denmark: Danish Kendo Federation (DKF)
  - Estonia: Estonian Kendo Federation (EsKF) 🔵
  - Finland: Finnish Kendo Association (FKA)
  - France: FFJDA – Comité National de Kendo & DR (CNKDR)
  - Georgia: Georgian Kendo Association (GKA) 🔵
  - Jordan: Jordan Kendo Federation (JKF) 🔵
  - Greece: Hellenic Kendo Iaido Naginata Federation (HKINF)
  - Ireland: Kendo na hÉireann (KnhÉ)
  - Israel: Israel Kendo & Budo Federation (IKBF) 🔵
  - Italy: Confederazione Italiana Kendo (CIK)
  - Latvia: Latvian Kendo Federation (LKF)
  - Lithuania: Lithuanian Kendo Association (LKA)
  - Luxembourg: Fédération Luxembourgeoise des Arts Martiaux (FLAM)
  - North Macedonia: Macedonian Kendo - Iaido Federation (MKIF)
  - Madagascar: Federation Malagasy de Kendo (FMKDA) 🔵
  - Malta: Maltese Kendo Federation (MKF)
  - Morocco: Fédération Royale Marocaine d’Aïkido, Iaido et Arts Martiaux (FRMAIAM) 🔵
  - Moldova: The Kendo Federation of the Republic of Moldova (MDA) 🔵
  - Montenegro: Montenegrin Kendo Federation (KSCG)
  - Mozambique: Ass. de Kendo e Iaido de Mocambique (AKIMO) 🔵
  - Norway: Norges Kendo Komitee (NKK)
  - Netherlands: Nederlandse Kendo Renmei (NKR)
  - Poland: Polski Zwiazek Kendo (PZK)
  - Portugal: Associação Portuguesa de Kendo (APK)
  - United Kingdom: British Kendo Association (BKA)
  - Czech Republic: Czech Kendo Federation (CKF)
  - Romania: Asociatia Cluburilor de Kendo, Iaido si Jodo (ACKIJ)
  - Russia: Russian Kendo Federation (RKF)
  - Serbia: Serbian Kendo Federation (SKF)
  - Slovakia: Slovak Kendo Federation (SKF) 🔵
  - Slovenia: Kendo Federation of Slovenia (KFSLO)
  - Spain: Real Federación Española de Judo y Deportes Asociados (RFEJYDA)
  - South Africa: South African Kendo Federation (SAKF)
  - Sweden: Svenska Kendoförbundet (SB&K)
  - Switzerland: Swiss Kendo + Iaido SJV / FSJ (SKI)
  - Tunisia: Association Sportive de Kendo (ASK)
  - Turkey: Turkish Kendo Association (TKC)
  - Ukraine: Ukraine Kendo Federation (UKF) 🔵
  - Hungary: Hungarian Kendo, Iaido and Jodo Federation (HKF)

== World Kendo Championships ==
The FIK has conducted the World Kendo Championships, every three years since the FIK was established in 1970. The international competition is contested by individual and team representatives of the FIK affiliated nations.

== Anti-doping ==
As member of SportAccord the International Kendo Federation is supporting in managing of anti-doping programmes. These anti-doping programmes are fully compliant with the World Anti-Doping Code.
