= British Kendo Association =

British martial arts organization

British Kendo Association

The British Kendo Association was founded in 1964 as a non-profit making organization to foster and develop the practice and spirit of Kendo, Iaido, and Jōdō along traditional lines with the objectives of:

- Organising and regulating the Kendo movement on a national international basis;
- Helping to foster related martial arts;
- Promoting Kendoka students to higher dan grades;
- Representing the UK internationally.

The BKA is the only organisation in the UK which is recognized for Kendo, Iaido and Jodo by the Zen Nihon Kendo Renmei (the foremost body in Japan for these martial arts), the International Kendo Federation and Sport England. It is also the only organization in the UK which is empowered to award Dan grades (black belts) in Kendo, Iaido and Jodo recognized by these bodies.
