= National Kendo Federation of Armenia =

Sporting Organization

National Kendo Federation of Armenia logo

The National Kendo Federation of Armenia (Armenian: Հայաստանի ազգային քենդո ֆեդերացիա) is the regulating body of kendo in Armenia, governed by the Armenian Olympic Committee. The headquarters of the federation is located in Yerevan.

== About ==
Armenian kendo athletes participate in various international kendo championships, the Federation also hosts national level competitions.

In October 2018, the Kendo Federation took part in a Martial Arts Festival organized by the embassy of Japan in Yerevan.

In August 2019, the Federation participated in the 8th International Kendo Seminar, held in Tbilisi.

== See also ==
- Geography of kendo
- Sport in Armenia
