= Georgian Kendo Association =

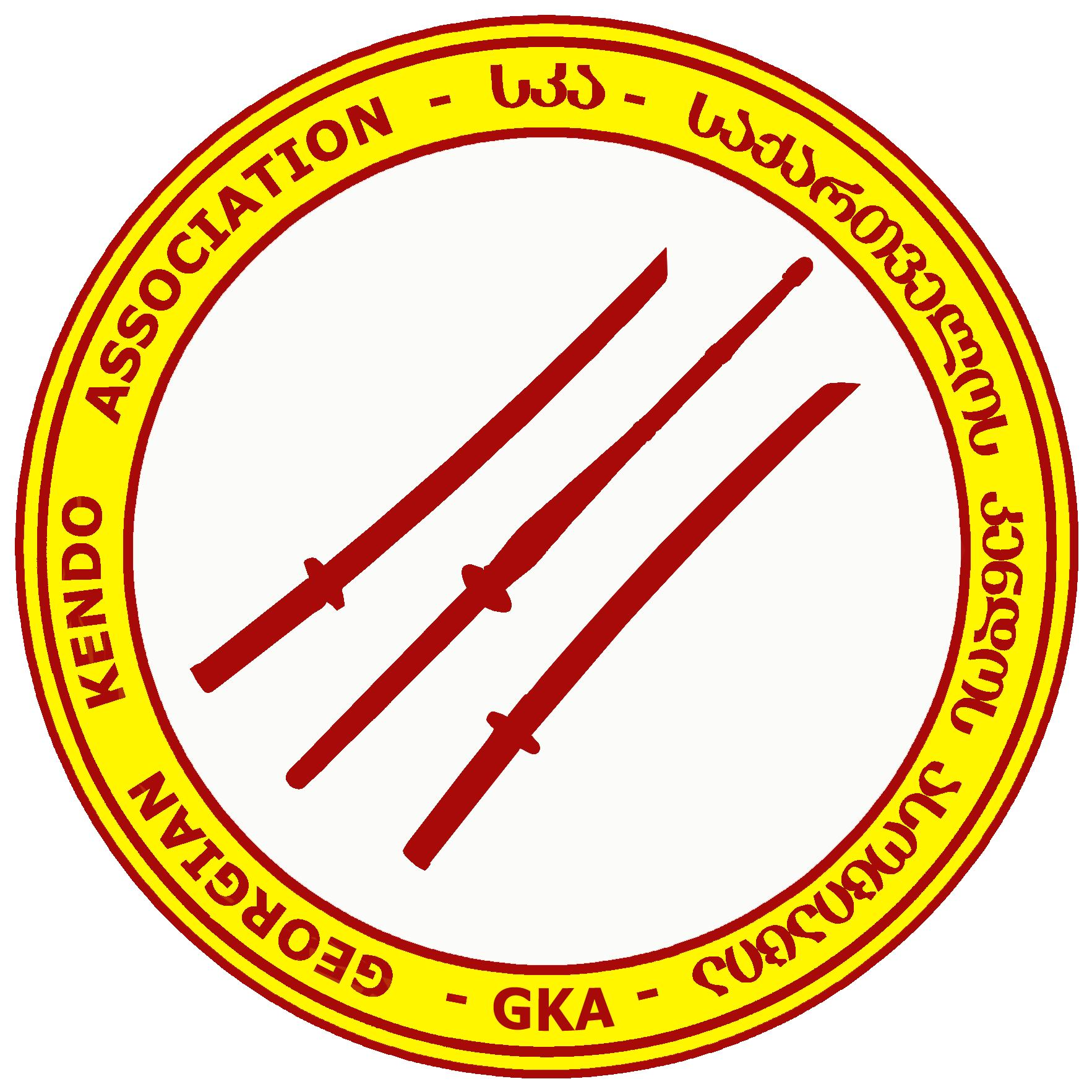
Georgian Kendo Association Logo

The Georgian Kendo Association (Georgian: საქართველოს კენდოს ასოციაცია, romanized: sakartvelos k'endos asotsiatsia) is the official governing body for kendo in Georgia. It operates as a member of the European Kendo Federation. The association's headquarters are located in Tbilisi.

== About ==
Georgian kendokas participate in international competitions, including the European Kendo Championships, where they competed in 2019 and 2022. The Georgian Kendo Association also organizes national-level events and tournaments to promote and develop kendo within the country.

The GZAAT Kendo Club, based at the Guivy Zaldastanishvili American Academy, is the largest kendo club in Georgia and the Caucasus and is part of the Association.
