= All Japan Kendo Federation =

Japanese martial arts organization

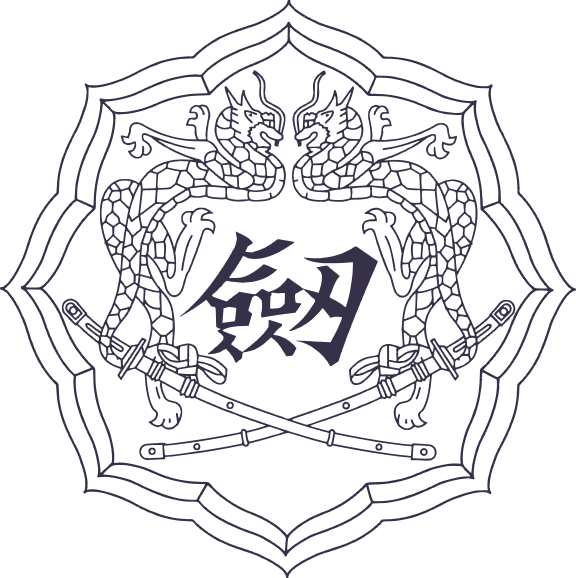
- Formation: 14 March 1954; 72 years ago
- Type: Sports organization
- Headquarters: Tokyo, Japan
- Members: 2,027,257 (2023)
- President: (Japan) Tadahiro Ajiro
- Vice Presidents: (Japan) Takeshi Masago (Japan) Takao Fujiwara (Japan) Tetsuro Ito
- Affiliations: International Kendo Federation
- Website: www.kendo.or.jp/en/

The All Japan Kendo Federation (全日本剣道連盟, Zennihon Kendō Renmei; abbr. 全剣連, Zen Ken Ren) is the governing body for Kendo in Japan, overseeing its development, competitions, and regulations across the country. Founded in 1952 and officially formed on March 14, 1954, it is a member of the International Kendo Federation and plays a central role in promoting and standardizing Kendo, Jōdō, and Iaido.

The AJKF is responsible for organizing national tournaments, conducting grading examinations, fostering traditional values, and overseeing the coordination of regional federations across Japan's 47 prefectures.

== History ==
The AJKF was founded in the aftermath of World War II, during which kendo was banned by the Allied Occupation forces due to its association with militarism.

The AJKF was officially formed on March 14, 1954. Its primary mission is to promote and standardize kendo, iaido, and jodo across Japan. In 1970, the AJKF played a central role in founding the International Kendo Federation (FIK), aiming to foster global interest and standardization in these martial arts. Over the decades, the AJKF has been instrumental in organizing national tournaments, establishing grading systems, and preserving the traditional values associated with these disciplines. Today, it continues to be a central authority in the martial arts community, both within Japan and internationally.

Kendo itself has a long history, evolving from the samurai's swordsmanship (kenjutsu) during Japan's feudal periods. The development of protective gear (bōgu) and bamboo swords (shinai) in the Edo period (1603–1868) laid the foundation for modern kendo, transforming it from a combat technique to a discipline focused on personal growth and character building.

== Championships ==
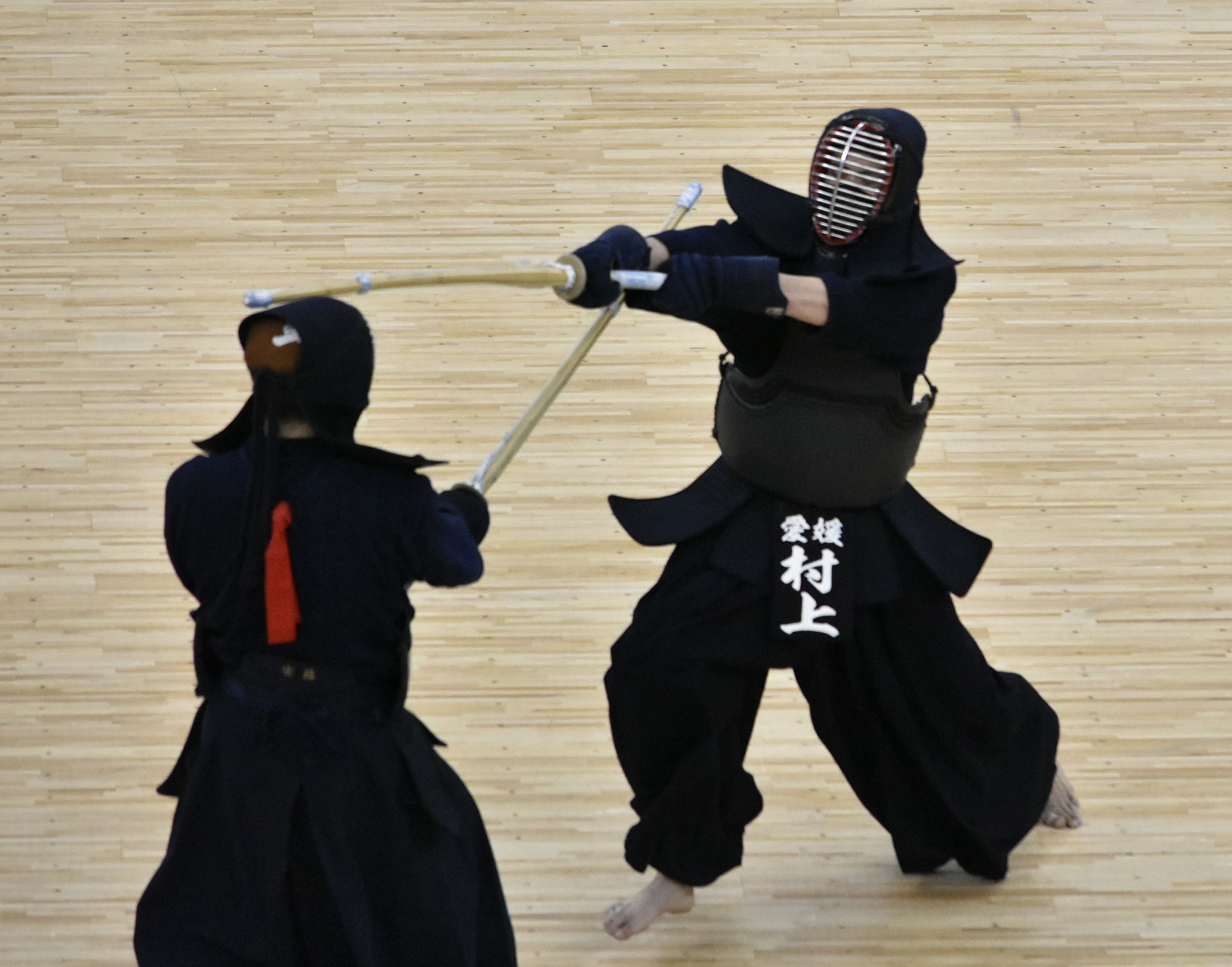
All Japan Kendo Championship in Tokyo, 2022

The All Japan Kendo Federation organizes various competitions and events, including:

- All Japan Kendo Championship (全日本剣道選手権大会, Zen Nihon Kendō Senshuken Taikai)
- All Japan Women's Kendo Championship (全日本女子剣道選手権大会, Zen Nihon Joshi Kendō Senshuken Taikai)
- All Japan Iaido Taikai (全日本居合道大会, Zen Nihon Iaidō Taikai)
- All Japan Jodo Taikai (全日本杖道大会, Zen Nihon Jōdō Taikai)
- All Japan Kendo 8-dan Tournament (全日本選抜剣道八段優勝大会, Zen Nihon Senbatsu Kendō Hachidan Yūshō Taikai)
- All Japan Tōzai-Taikō (East vs. West Japan) Kendo Tournament (全日本東西対抗剣道大会, Zen Nihon Tōzai-Taikō Kendō Taikai)
- All Japan Interprefecture Kendo Championship (全日本都道府県対抗剣道優勝大会, Zen Nihon Todōfuken Taikō Kendō Yūshō Taikai)
- All Japan Kendo Enbu Taikai (全日本剣道演武大会, Zen Nihon Kendō Enbu Taikai), commonly known as the Kyoto Taikai (京都大会, Kyōto Taikai)
- All Japan Boys and Girls Martial Arts (Kendo) Training Tournament (全日本少年少女武道（剣道）錬成大会, Zen Nihon Shōnen Shōjobudō (Kendō) Rensei Taikai)

The All Japan Kendo Championship is considered the most important Kendo competition in the world, even more prestigious than the World Kendo Championships.

The All Japan Kendo Enbu Taikai is the oldest, most traditional, and most prestigious Kendo event in both Japan and the world.

In addition to the above competitions and events, which cater to a select group of practitioners (such as professional athletes or high-ranking practitioners), the AJKF also organizes open events for all practitioners without any distinction. One such event is the Kendo Godo Keiko-kai for all (剣道合同稽古会 全国対象, Kendō gōdō keiko-kai zenkoku taishō), where all kenshi are invited to participate free of charge.

== See also ==
- All Japan Kendo Championship
- European Kendo Federation
- All United States Kendo Federation
- Geography of kendo
- Zen Nippon Kendo Renmei Iaido
