= World Kendo Championship =

International kendo competition in Italy

World Kendo Championships
- Venue: Nippon Budokan
- Location: Tokyo, Japan
- Dates: May 27th - 30th 2027

Champions
- Current Individual Champions
- Men: Keita Hoshiko
- Women: Mihiro Kondo

The World Kendo Championship is an international kendo competition contested by the member nations of the International Kendo Federation (FIK). The championships have been conducted every three years since the inception in 1970. The host of the tournament usually rotates in order through the three FIK administrative regions of Asia, the Americas and Europe (the canceled 2021 tournament and the 2024 tournament were both in Europe).

The competition is divided into four divisions: Men's Individual, Women's Individual, Men's Team, Women's Team. Team matches are individual matches between five members from each team where each member competes in 1 round.

Until 2006, Japan had never lost a championship in any of the four divisions, when the Japanese men's team lost to the USA in the semi-final, with South Korea winning in the final. Previously other teams had come close, such as South Korea (1997, 2003) and Canada (2000). In the individual divisions, South Koreans are appearing more often in the semi-finals and final.

There is an opinion in Japan that this tournament is not of the same caliber as the All Japan Kendo Championship or the All Japan Police Kendo Championship. The argument being that there is a distinct qualitative difference in the playing level and style of nationalities where Japanese people lived or immigrated to before WW2, and countries that began practicing Kendo post-war. Another opinion is that the level of non-Japanese referees is not of high enough caliber for matches to be judged fairly. In order to offset this, mandatory international referee seminars are organized by the International Kendo Federation with high-ranking Japanese Kendo officials as lecturers.

On 4 September 2020, FIK postponed the 18th championships (18WKC), originally scheduled for May 2021, to a later date, due to the COVID-19 pandemic. It was then cancelled on 20 February 2021

The 19th World Kendo Championships (19WKC) was held in Milan, Italy from 4-7 July 2024. A Kendo practitioner from Taiwan competed for the Chinese team causing controversies regarding his qualifications and citizenship.

== Men's ==
=== Team ===
The following is a summary of medals acquired by country for the Men's Team Division.

Rank	Nation	Gold	Silver	Bronze	Total
1	Japan	17	0	1	18
2	South Korea	1	11	3	15
3	United States	0	2	9	11
4	Brazil	0	2	5	7
4	Canada	0	2	5	7
6	Chinese Taipei	0	1	6	7
7	Hawaii	0	0	2	2
7	Hungary	0	0	2	2
9	France	0	0	1	1
9	Italy	0	0	1	1
9	Okinawa	0	0	1	1
Totals (11 entries)		18	18	36	72

=== Individual ===
Year	Final		Third Place		Top Eight			
Year	Winner	Runner-up	Third Place		Top Eight			
1970	M. Kobayashi, Japan	T. Toda, Japan	T. Yaniguchi, Japan	T. Ota, Japan				
1973	T. Sakuragi, Japan	H. Yano, Japan	T. Fujita, Japan	J.R. Rhee, South Korea				
1976	E. Yokoo, Japan	K. Ono, Japan	K. Hosoda, Japan	C. Wu, Taiwan	Kawase, Japan	Arima, Japan	Sato, Japan	Ito, Japan
1979	H. Yamada, Japan	K. Furukawa, Japan	H. Aikawa, Japan	K. Terada, Japan	S. Kim, South Korea	S. Nakauchi, USA	S. Suzuki, Japan	K. Koh, South Korea
1982	M. Makita, Japan	T. Kosaka, Japan	W. Okajima, Japan	H. Yasugahira, Japan	J.W. Lee, South Korea	R. Kaneshiro, USA	H.G. Jang, South Korea	M. Grivas, USA
1985	K. Koda, Japan	H. Ogawa, Japan	J.C. Park, South Korea	K.N. Kim, South Korea	Johnson, Canada	Komatsu, Japan	Umeyama, Japan	Ujiie, Japan
1988	I. Okido, Japan	A. Hayashi, Japan	H. Sakata, Japan	K.N. Kim, South Korea	J.H. Lee, South Korea	M. Ishizuka, Japan	J.K. Kim, South Korea	R. Kishikawa, Brazil
1991	S. Muto, Japan	H. Sakata, Japan	M. Yamamoto, Japan	S. Shimizu, Japan	E. Ohara, Canada	C.S. Oh, South Korea	W. Huh, South Korea	M. Miyazaki, Japan
1994	H. Takahashi, Japan	K. Takei, Japan	S. Hirano, Japan	N. Eiga, Japan	Y.C. Park, South Korea	T. Davidson, Canada	Y. Okamoto, Japan	T. Nabeyama, Japan
1997	M. Miyazaki, Japan	F. Miyazaki, Japan	T. Ishida, Japan	S.S. Park, South Korea	J.S. Yang, South Korea	Y.Y. Liu, Taiwan	T. Terachi, Japan	J.P. Labru, France
2000	N. Eiga, Japan	K. Takenaka, Japan	T. Someya, Japan	S.S. Hong, South Korea	S. Asaoka, Canada	C. Yang, USA	H. Hirata, Japan	C.Y. Kim, South Korea
2003	H. Sato, Japan	H. Iwasa, Japan	M. Sato, Japan	K. Lim, South Korea	M. Salonen, Finland	K. Ando, Japan	C. Yang, USA	S.S. Park, South Korea
2006	M. Hojo, Japan	T. Tanaka, Japan	S. Kang, South Korea	G. Oh, South Korea	S. Kamata, Canada	C. Cheng, Taiwan	S. Harada, Japan	G. Sicart, France
2009	S. Teramoto, Japan	B. Park, South Korea	K. Lee, South Korea	C. Choi, South Korea	K. Smith, Australia	D. Wako, Japan	T. Furusawa, Japan	J. Brown, USA
2012	S. Takanabe, Japan	W. Kim, South Korea	T. Kim, South Korea	K. Furukawa, Japan	J. Bertout, France	T.A. Hoang, Canada	R. Omasa, Brazil	S. Okido, Japan
2015	T. Amishiro, Japan	Y. Takenouchi, Japan	M. Jang, South Korea	H. Nishimura, Japan	J. Bertout, France	K. Bosak, Poland	R. Murase, Japan	J. Jo, South Korea
2018	S. Ando, Japan	J. Jo, South Korea	B. Park, South Korea	Y. Takenouchi, Japan	Y. Katsumi, Japan	C. Takayama, Brazil	J. Hatakeyama, USA	M. Jang, South Korea
2024	K. Hoshiko, Japan	K. Matsuzaki, Japan	S. Ohira, Japan	K. Kimura, Japan	A. Kishikawa, Australia	K. Rukas, Great Britain	J. Wright, Great Britain	J. Williams, USA

== Women's ==
=== Team ===
The following is a summary of medals acquired by country for the Women's Team Division. (5-person team)

Rank	Nation	Gold	Silver	Bronze	Total
1	Japan	7	0	0	7
2	South Korea	0	6	0	6
3	Brazil	0	1	3	4
4	Canada	0	0	4	4
5	United States	0	0	3	3
6	Australia	0	0	2	2
6	Germany	0	0	2	2
8	Chinese Taipei	0	0	1	1
Totals (8 entries)		7	7	15	29

=== Individual ===
Year	Final		Third Place		Top Eight			
Year	Winner	Runner-up	Third Place		Top Eight			
1997	M. Kimura, Japan	S. Mogi, Japan	W. Nakano, Canada	H.J. Cho, Korea	S. Konishi, Brazil	I. Benkman, Germany	P. Sato, Brazil	S. Kondo, Japan
2000	T. Kawano, Japan	K. Baba, Japan	H. Yano, Japan	S. Asahina, Japan	S. Konishi, Brazil	E.H. Kwon, South Korea	M. Korogi, Japan	H.H. Cho, South Korea
2003	K. Baba, Japan	Y. Tsubota, Japan	S. Asahina, Japan	K. Okada, Japan	N. Soulas, France	M. Onaka, Brazil	Y.J. Park, South Korea	C. Shinzato, Japan
2006	S. Sugimoto, Japan	K. Komuro, Japan	E. Inagaki, Japan	M. Shimokawa, Japan	M. Hayashi, Canada	A. Byeon, South Korea	A. Sipos, Hungary	Y. Park, South Korea
2009	Y. Takami, Japan	S. Shojima, Japan	C. Shinzato, Japan	E. Takashina, Brazil	M. Livolsi, Italy	Y. Lee, South Korea	M. Hamanaka, Canada	M. Raitanen, Finland
2012	S. Sakuma, Japan	K. Kurokawa, Japan	S. Shodai, Japan	K. Kawagoe, Japan	S. Park, South Korea	S. Tamura, USA	K. Jeon, South Korea	H. Yu, South Korea
2015	M. Matsumoto, Japan	Y.Y. Hu, South Korea	B.K. Won, South Korea	Y. Takami, Japan	S. Woude, Netherlands	M. Kawagoe, Japan	F. Smout, Netherlands	H. Yamada, Canada
2018	M. Matsumoto, Japan	M. Yamamoto, Japan	M. Senoo, Japan	M. Fujimoto, Japan	A. Akyla, Greece	H. Lee, South Korea	N. Chun, Hawaii	S. Woude, Netherlands
2024	M. Kondo, Japan	M. Suenaga, Japan	M. Sato, Japan	M. Senoo, Japan	K. Kishikawa, Australia	B. Park, Canada	M. Fisher Great Britain	K. Tada, USA

== Hosts ==
The following is a list of the host countries of the World Kendo Championships.

Number	Year	Location
1st	1970	Japan, Tokyo
2nd	1973	United States, Los Angeles
3rd	1976	United Kingdom, England, Milton Keynes
4th	1979	Japan, Sapporo
5th	1982	Brazil, São Paulo
6th	1985	France, Paris
7th	1988	South Korea, Seoul
8th	1991	Canada, Toronto
9th	1994	France, Paris
10th	1997	Japan, Kyoto
11th	2000	United States, Santa Clara
12th	2003	United Kingdom, Scotland, Glasgow
13th	2006	Taiwan, Taipei
14th	2009	Brazil, São Paulo
15th	2012	Italy, Novara
16th	2015	Japan, Tokyo
17th	2018	South Korea, Incheon
18th	2021	France, Paris. Cancelled, due to the COVID-19 pandemic.
19th	2024	Italy, Milan
20th	2027	Japan, Tokyo

== See also ==
- European Kendo Championships
