= Kendo =

Modern Japanese martial art

- 剣道
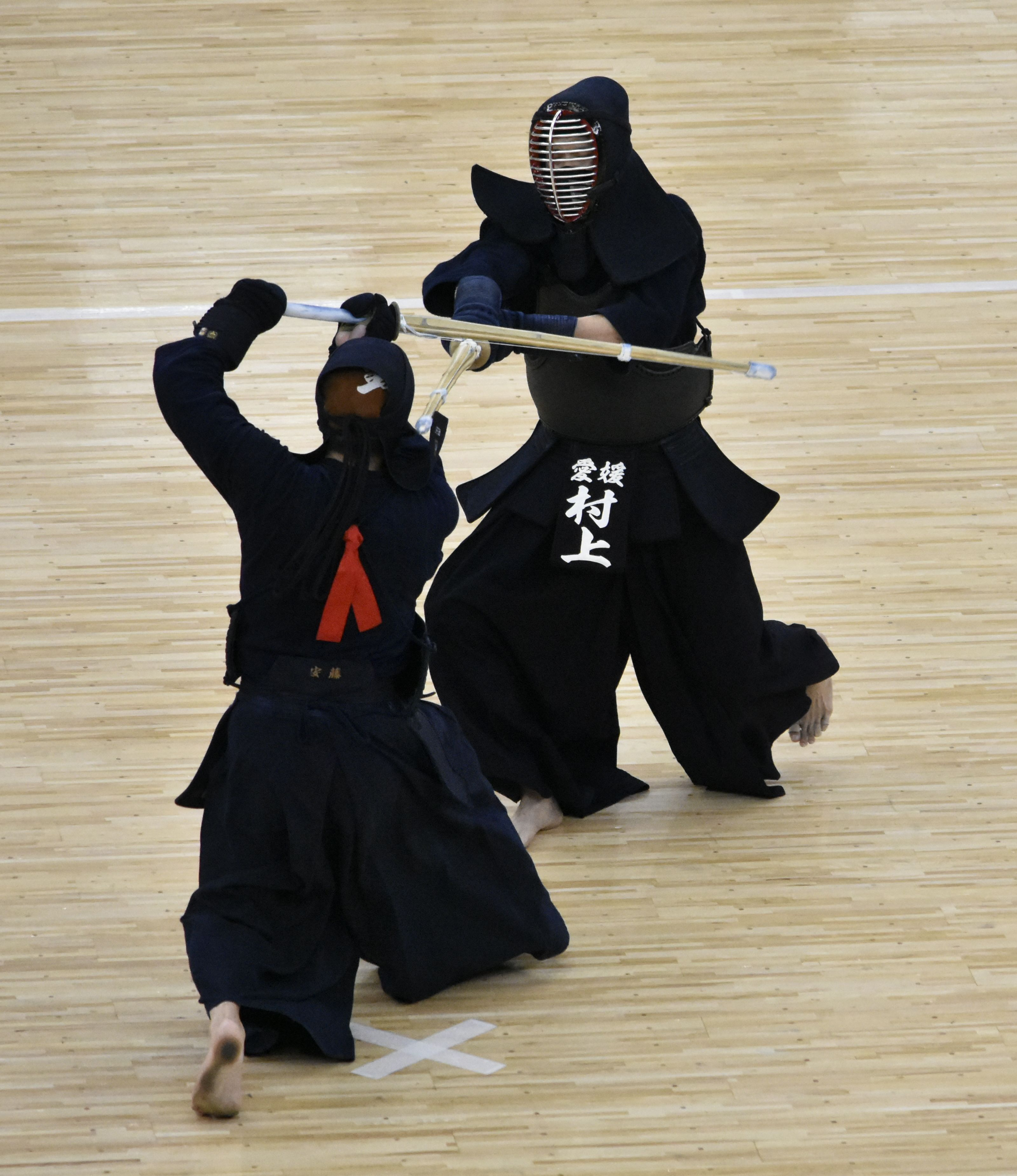
- 2022 All Japan Kendo Championship
- Focus: Weaponry
- Hardness: Semi-contact
- Country of origin: Japan
- Parenthood: kenjutsu
- Official website: www.kendo-fik.org

Kendo (Japanese: 剣道, Hepburn: Kendō; lit. 'sword way' or 'sword path' or 'way of the sword') is a modern Japanese martial art, descended from kenjutsu (one of the old Japanese martial arts, swordsmanship), that uses bamboo swords (shinai) as well as protective armor (bōgu). It began as samurai warriors' customary swordsmanship exercises, and today, it is widely practiced within Japan and has spread to many other nations across the world.

== History ==
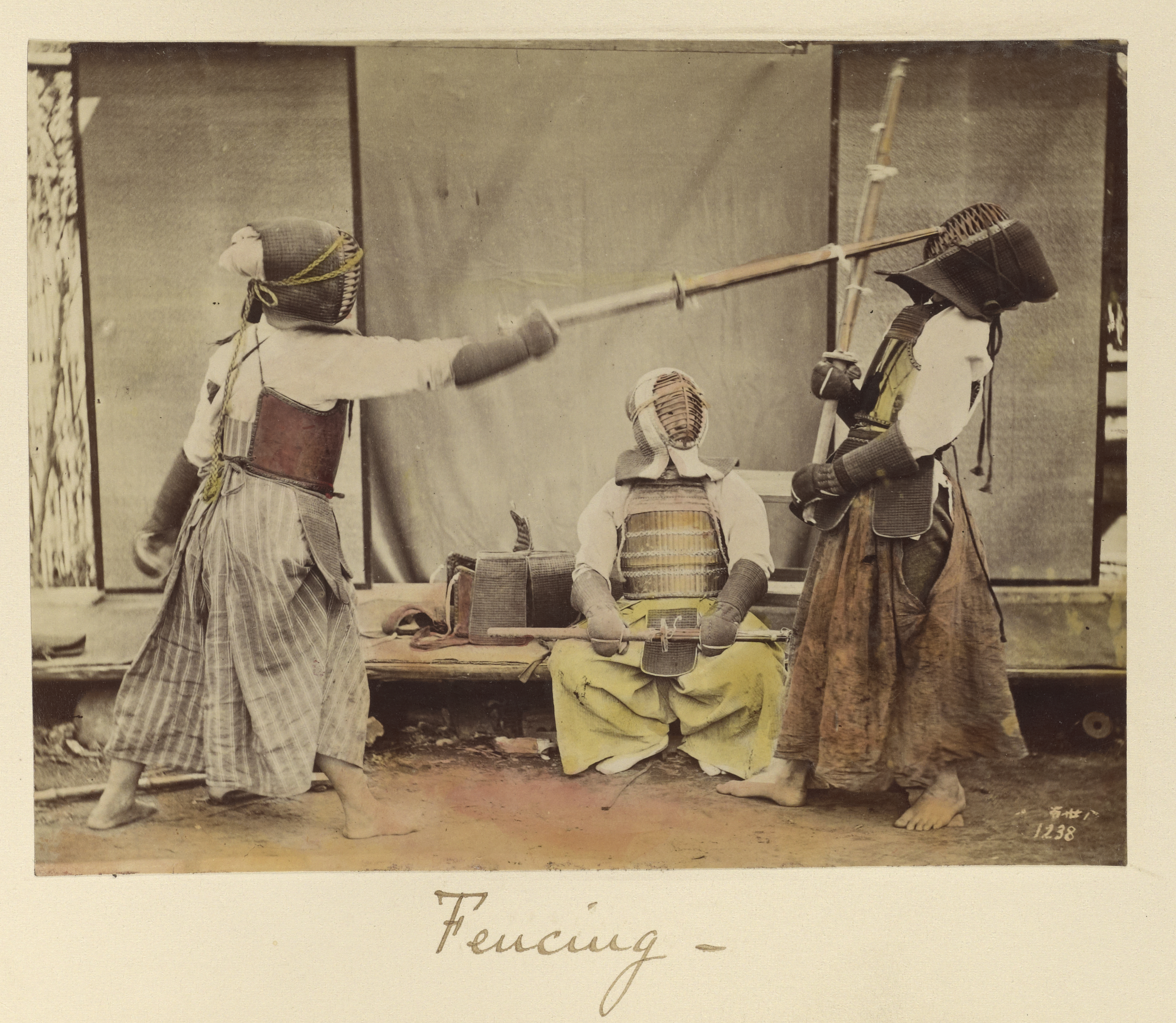
Kendo in the early Meiji period (1873)

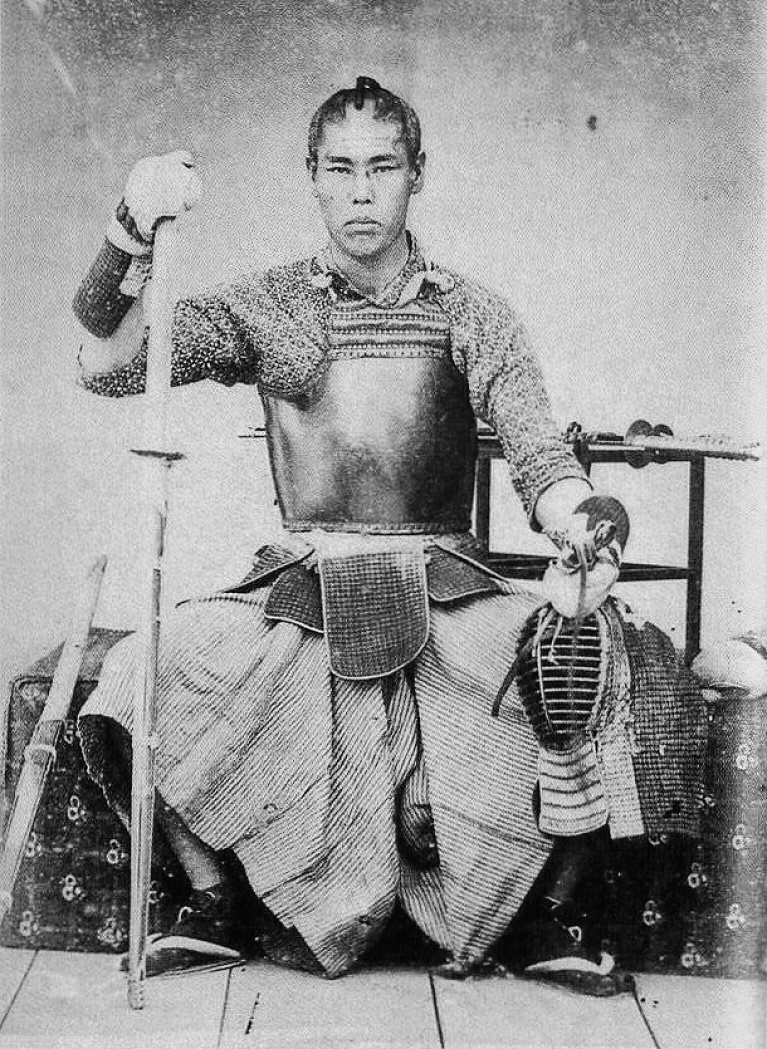
Takasugi Shinsaku, late Edo period kendo practitioner

Swordsmen in Japan established schools of kenjutsu (the ancestor of kendo). These continued for centuries and form the basis of kendo practice today. Formal kendo exercises known as kata were developed several centuries ago as kenjutsu practice for warriors. They are still studied today, in a modified form.

The introduction of bamboo practice swords and armor to sword training is attributed to Naganuma Shirōzaemon Kunisato (長沼 四郎左衛門 国郷; 1688–1767) during the Shotoku Era (1711–1715). Naganuma developed the use of this armor and established a training method using bamboo swords.

Yamada Heizaemon Mitsunori (Ippūsai) (山田平左衛門光徳(一風斎); 1638–1718), father of Naganuma and the eighth headmaster of the Kashima Shinden Jikishinkage-ryū Kenjutsu, is credited with improving the art with Japanese wooden and bamboo swords, according to his gravestone's inscription. He is also credited with refining the armor by adding a metal grille to the headpiece (面; men) and thick cotton protective coverings to the gauntlets that cover the wrists and hands (小手; kote). Naganuma Shirōzaemon Kunisato (長沼四郎左衛門国郷; 1688–1767) inherited the tradition from his father, Heizaemon, in 1708, and the two of them collaborated to improve what would become modern kendo training armor.

Shūsaku Narimasa Chiba (千葉 周作 成政; 1792–1855), founder of the Hokushin Ittō-ryū Hyōhō (北辰一刀流兵法), introduced gekiken (撃剣) (full-contact duels with bamboo swords and training armor) to the curriculum of tradition arts in the 1820s. Due to the large number of students of the Hokushin Ittō-ryū Hyōhō at the end of the Edo period, the use of bamboo swords and armor as a form of practice became popular. Modern kendo techniques, such as Suriage-Men and Oikomi-Men, were originally Hokushin Ittō-ryū techniques, were named by Chiba Shūsaku. After the Meiji Restoration in the late 1800s, Sakakibara Kenkichi popularized public gekiken for commercial gain, resulting in increased interest in kendo and kenjutsu.

In 1876, five years after a voluntary surrender of swords, the government banned the use of swords by the surviving samurai and initiated sword hunts. Meanwhile, in an attempt to standardize the sword styles (kenjutsu) used by policemen, Kawaji Toshiyoshi recruited swordsmen from various schools to come up with a unified swordsmanship style. This led to the rise of the Battotai (抜刀隊, lit. Drawn Sword Corps), consisting mainly of sword-wielding policemen. However, it proved difficult to integrate all sword arts, leading to a compromise of ten practice moves (kata) for police training. This integration effort led to the development of modern kendo. In 1878, Kawaji wrote a book on swordsmanship, Gekiken Saikō-ron (Revitalizing Swordsmanship), stressing sword styles should not disappear with modernization, but should be integrated as necessary skills for the police. He draws a particular example from his experience with the Satsuma Rebellion. The Junsa Kyōshūjo (Patrolman's Training Institute), founded in 1879, provided a curriculum that allowed policemen to study gekiken during their off-hours. In the same year, Kawaji wrote another book on swordsmanship, Kendo Saikō-ron (Revitalizing Kendo), defending the significance of such sword art training for the police. While Junsa Kyōshūjo remained active only until 1881, the police continued to support such practice.

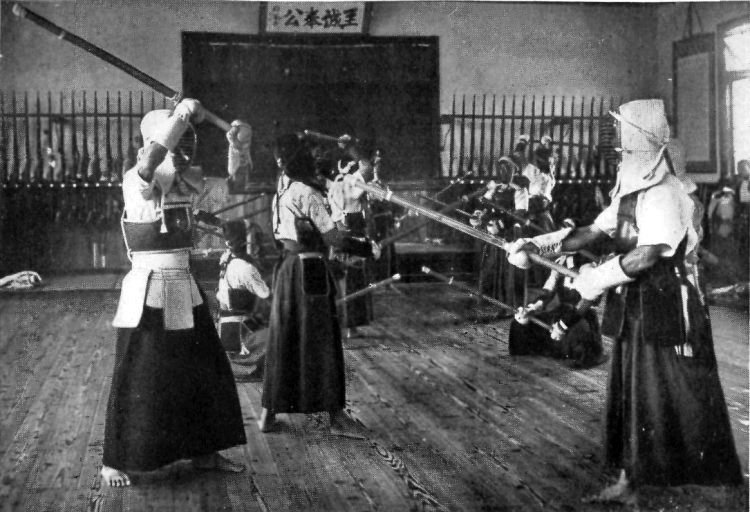
Kendo at an agricultural school in Japan around 1920

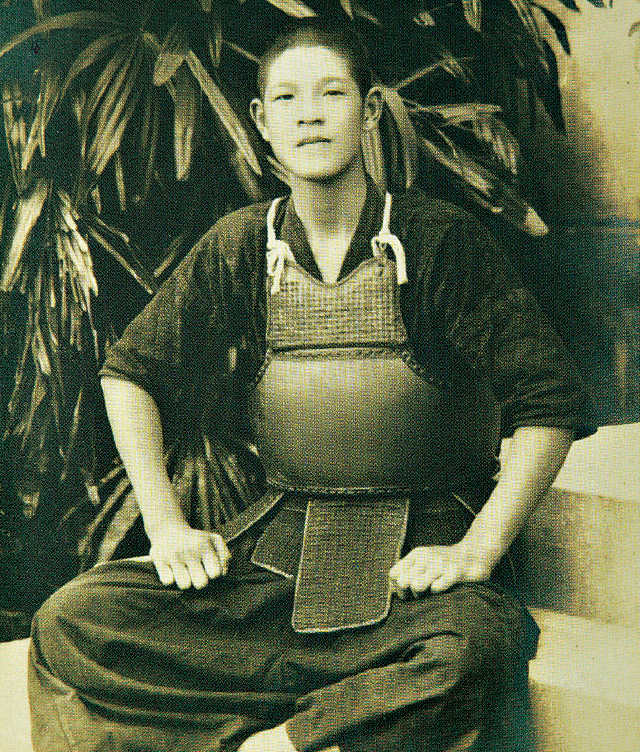
Lee Teng-hui, later President of Republic of China (Taiwan), wearing kendo protector as a junior high school student in Japanese Taiwan

The Dai Nippon Butoku Kai (DNBK) was established in 1895 to promote martial arts in Japan. It changed the name of the sporting form of swordsmanship, gekiken, (Kyūjitai: 擊劍 and Shinjitai: 撃剣, "hitting sword") to kendō in 1920.

Kendo (along with other martial arts) was banned in Japan in 1946 by the occupying powers. This was part of "the removal and exclusion from public life of militaristic and ultra-nationalistic persons" in response to the wartime militarization of martial arts instruction in Japan. The DNBK was also disbanded. Kendo was allowed to return to the curriculum in 1950, first as "shinai competition" (竹刀競技, shinai kyōgi) and then as kendo in 1952.

The All Japan Kendo Federation (AJKF or ZNKR) was founded in 1952, immediately after Japan's independence was restored and the ban on martial arts in Japan was lifted. It was formed on the principle of kendo not as a martial art, but as educational sport and it has continued to be practiced as such.

The International Kendo Federation (FIK) was founded in April 1970. It is an international federation of national and regional kendo federations, and the world governing body for kendo. The FIK is a non-governmental organization, and it aims to promote and popularize kendo, iaido and jodo.

The International Martial Arts Federation (IMAF), established in Kyoto 1952, was the first international organization founded since World War II to promote the development of martial arts worldwide. Today, IMAF includes kendo as one of the Japanese disciplines.

== Practitioners ==
Practitioners of kendo are called kendōka (剣道家), meaning "someone who practices kendo", or occasionally kenshi (剣士), meaning "swordsman". Additionally, the old term of kendoists is sometimes used.

The Kodansha Meibo, a register of dan graded members of the AJKF, lists (as of September 2007) 1.48 million registered dan graded kendōka in Japan. According to a survey conducted by AJKF, the number of active kendo practitioners in Japan is 477,000, including 290,000 dan holders. From these figures, AJKF estimates that the number of kendōka in Japan is 1.66 million, with over 6 million practitioners worldwide, with registered dan holders and active kendo practitioners without dan grade.

== Concept and purpose ==
In 1975, the All Japan Kendo Federation developed and published "The Concept and Purpose of Kendo" (reproduced below).

=== Concept ===
Kendo is a way to discipline the human character through the application of the principles of the katana.

=== Purpose ===
To mold the mind and body.
To cultivate a vigorous spirit
And through correct and structured training,
To strive for improvement in the art of Kendo.
To hold in esteem courtesy and honor.
To associate with others with sincerity.
And to forever pursue the cultivation of oneself.

Thus will one be able:
To love one's country and society;
To contribute to the development of culture;
And to promote peace and prosperity among all people.

== Equipment and clothing ==
Kendo is practiced wearing a traditional Japanese style of clothing, protective armor (防具, bōgu) and using one or, less commonly two, shinai (竹刀, shinai).

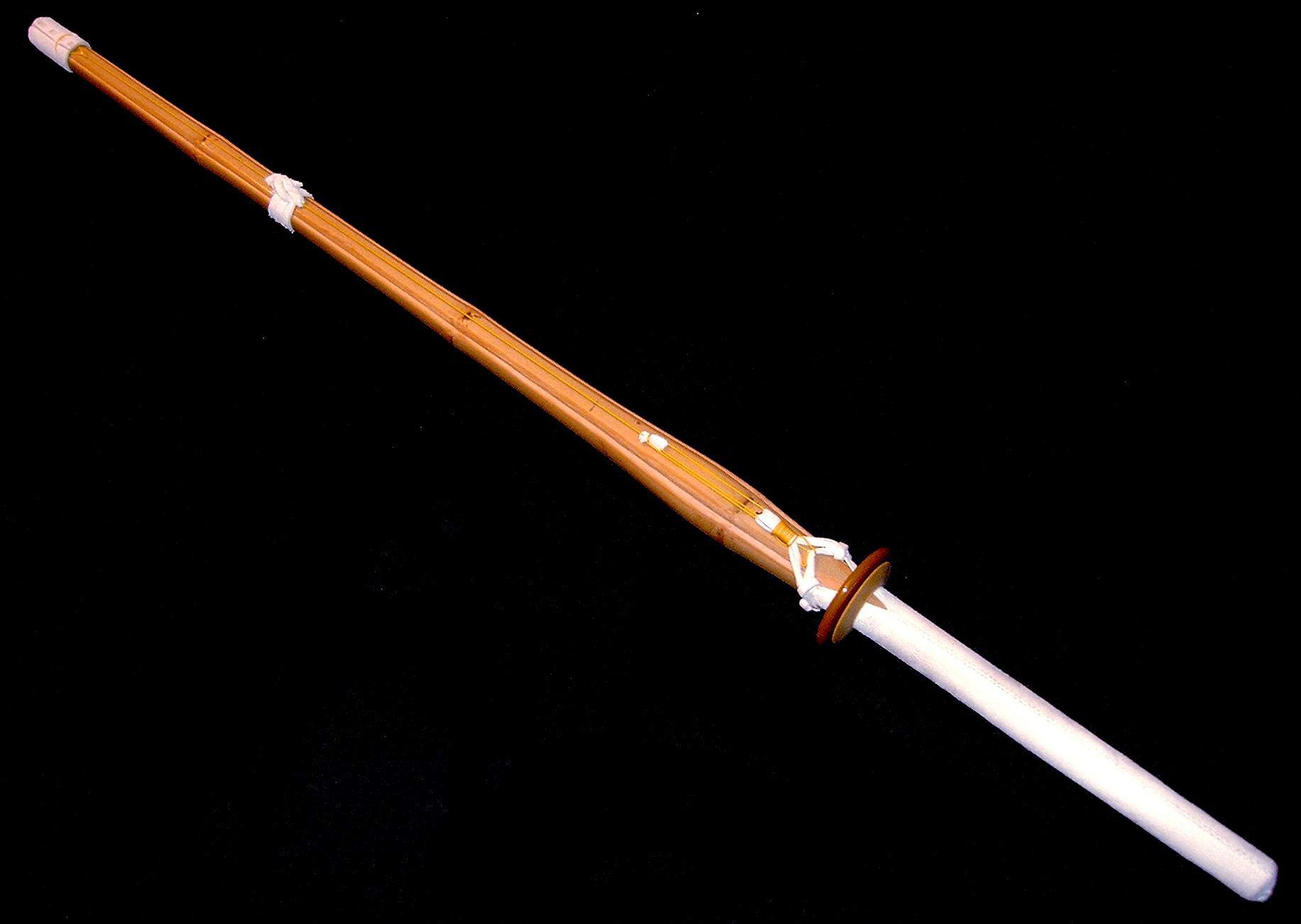
Shinai (竹刀)

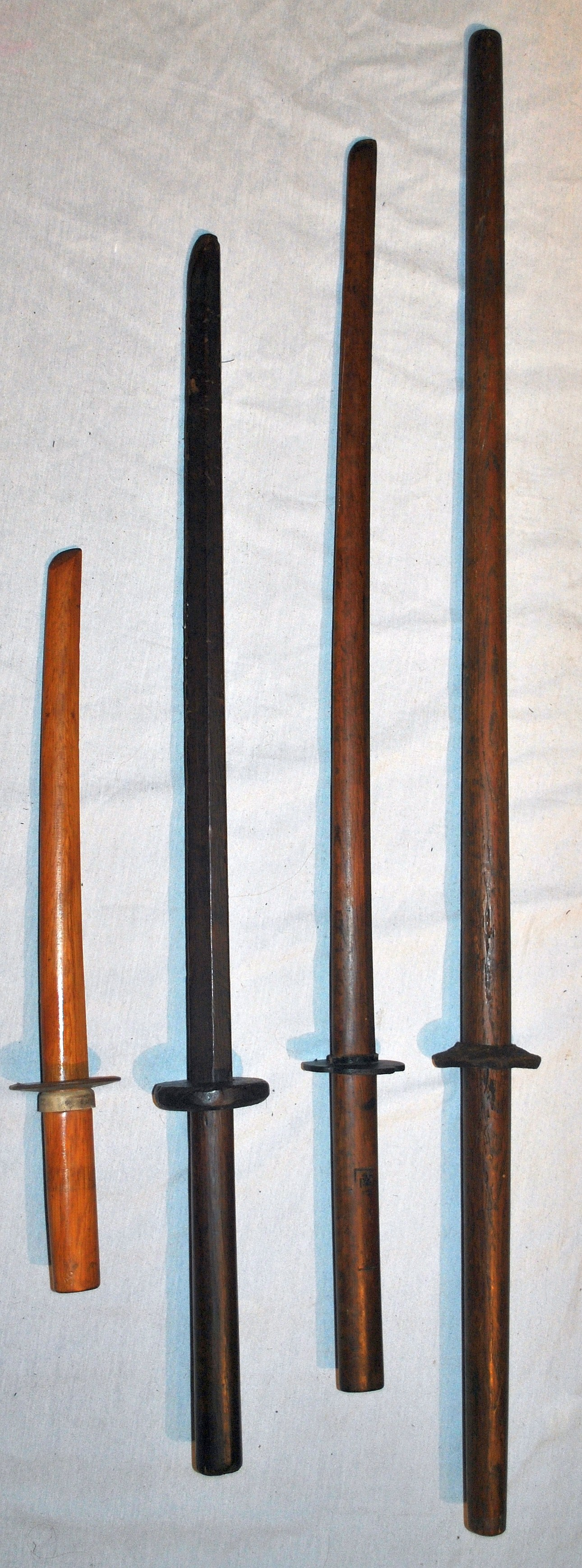
Bokutō (木刀)

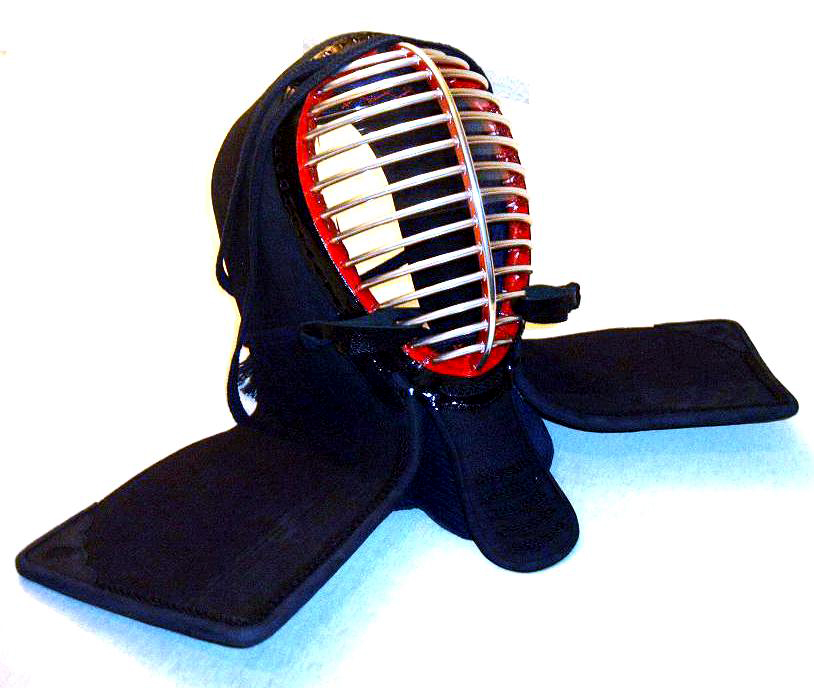
Men (面)

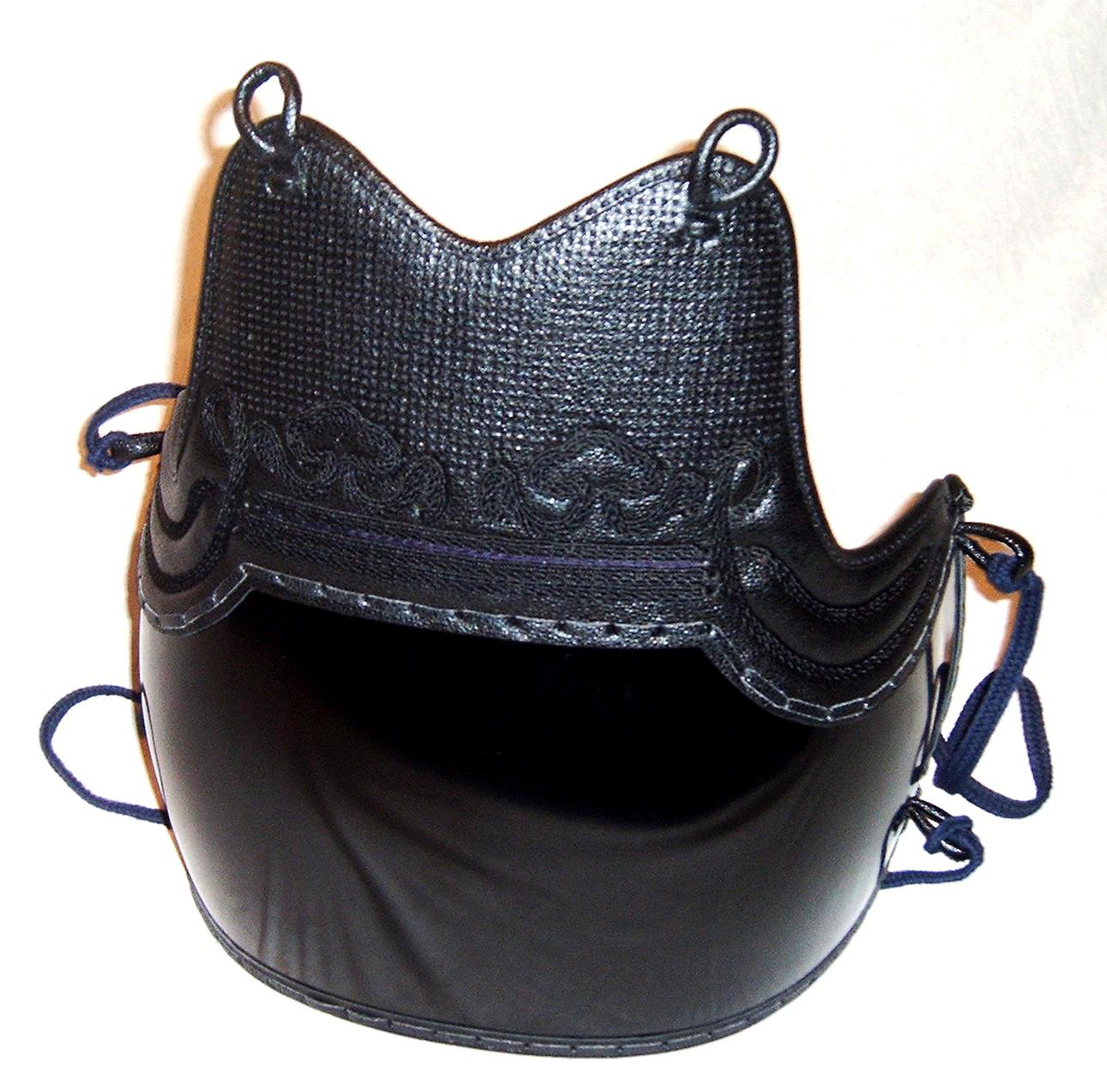
Dō (胴)

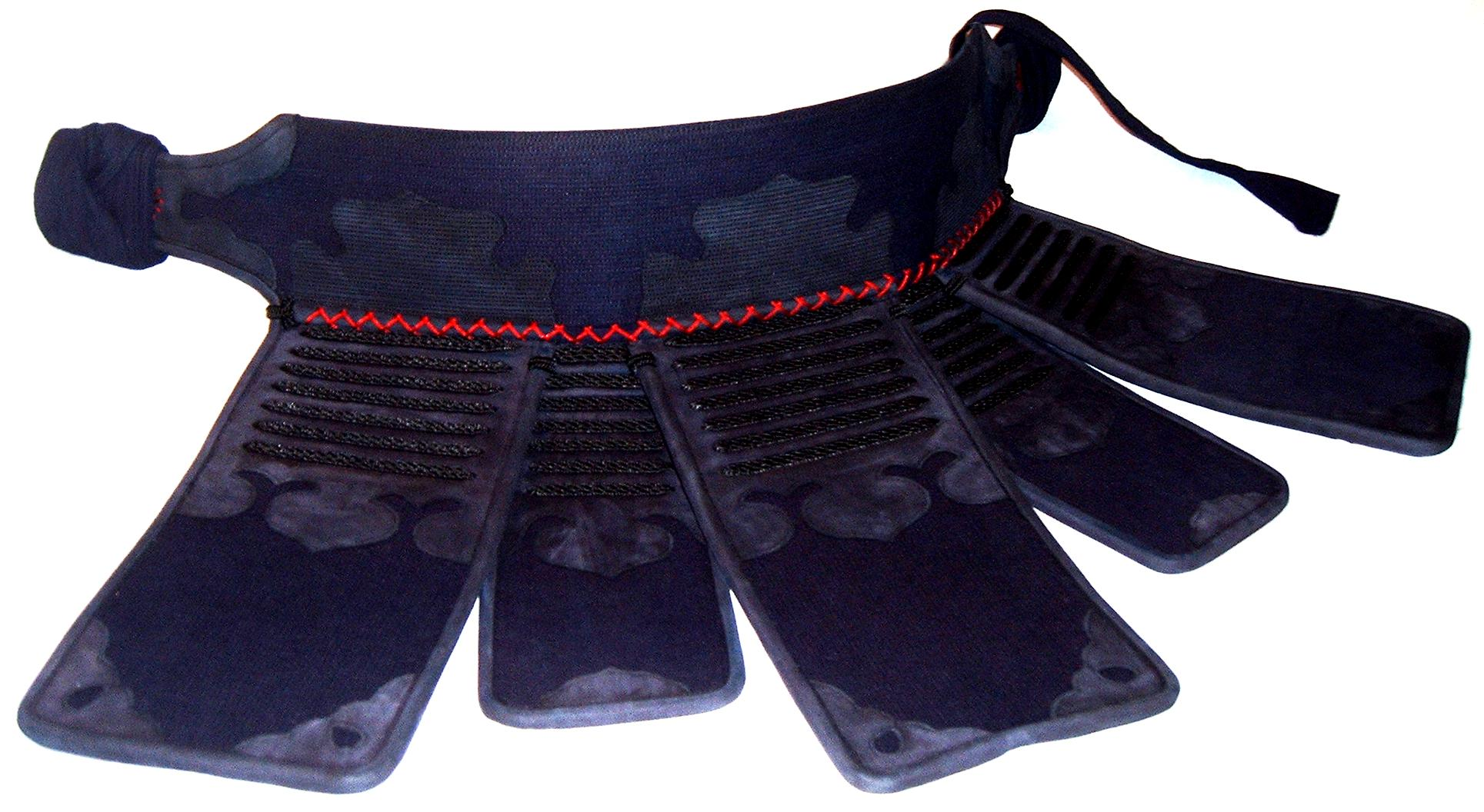
Tare (垂れ)

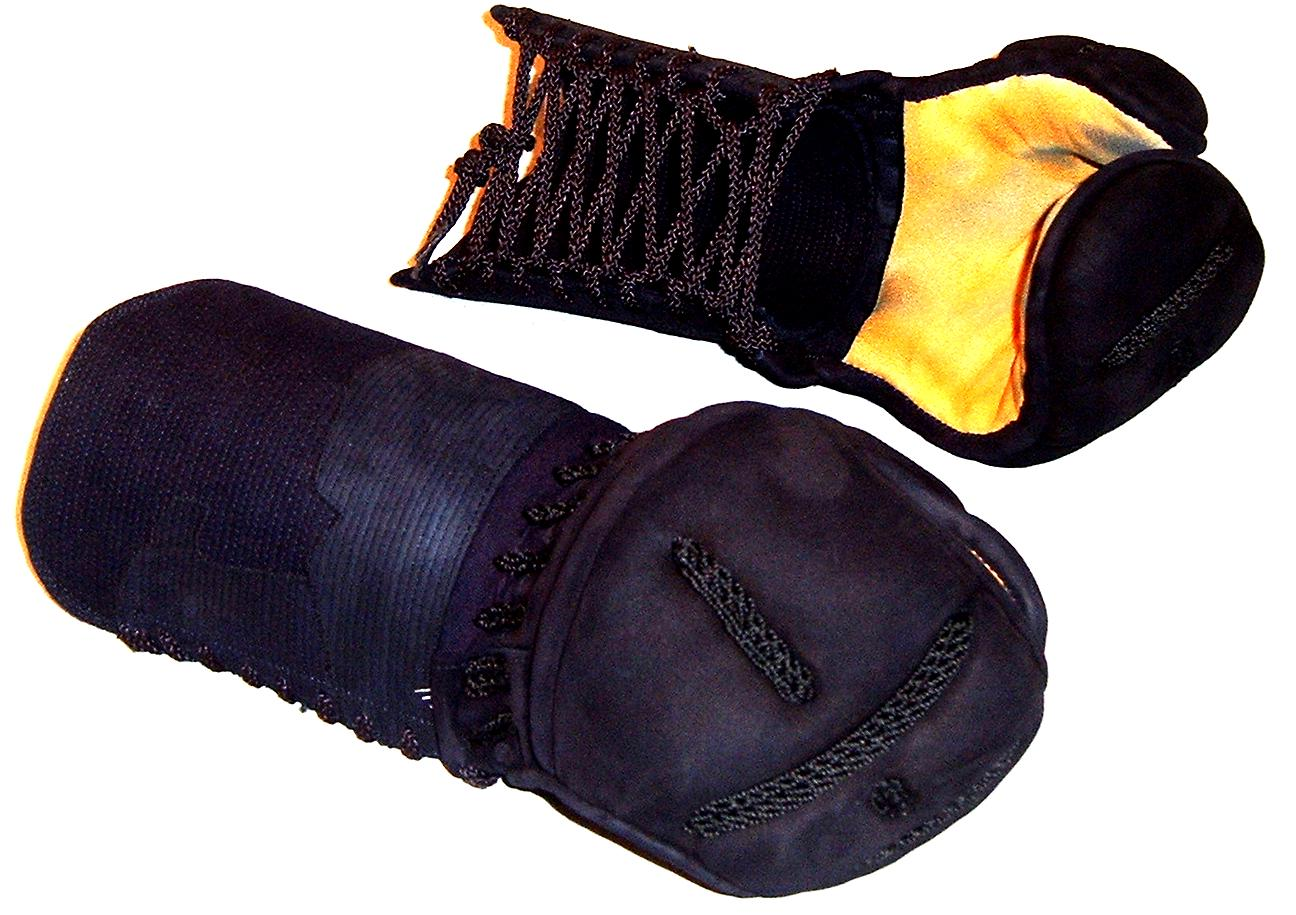
Kote (小手)

Armour and clothing components

=== Equipment ===
The shinai is meant to represent a Japanese sword (katana) and is made up of four bamboo slats which are held together by leather fittings. A modern variation of a shinai with carbon fiber reinforced resin slats is also used.

Age Group Shinai Size

Junior High School – 12–15 years	114 cm or less – Size 37
Senior High School – 15–18	117 cm or less – Size 38
University & Adults – 18 years +	120 cm or less – Size 39

Kendōka also use hard wooden swords (木刀, bokutō) to practice kata.

Kendo employs strikes involving both one edge and the tip of the shinai or bokutō.

Protective armor is worn to protect specified target areas on the head, arms, and body. The head is protected by a stylized helmet, called men (面), with a metal grille (面金, men-gane) to protect the face, a series of hard leather and fabric flaps (突垂れ, tsuki-dare) to protect the throat, and padded fabric flaps (面垂れ, men-dare) to protect the side of the neck and shoulders. The forearms, wrists, and hands are protected by long, thickly padded fabric gloves called kote (小手). The torso is protected by a breastplate (胴, dō), while the waist and groin area are protected by the tare (垂れ), consisting of three thick vertical fabric flaps or faulds.

=== Clothing ===
The clothing worn under the bōgu comprise a jacket (kendogi or keikogi) and hakama, a garment separated in the middle to form two wide trouser legs.

A cotton towel (手拭い, tenugui) is wrapped around the head, under the men, to absorb perspiration and provide a base for the men to fit comfortably.

== Modern practice ==
Kendo training is quite noisy in comparison to some other martial arts or sports. This is because kendōka use a shout, or kiai (気合い), to express their fighting spirit when striking. Additionally, kendōka execute fumikomi-ashi (踏み込み足), an action similar to a stamp of the front foot, during a strike.

Like some other martial arts, kendōka train and fight barefoot. Kendo is ideally practiced in a purpose-built dōjō, though standard sports halls and other venues are often used with foam mats to avoid injury. An appropriate venue has a clean and wooden sprung floor, suitable for fumikomi-ashi.

Kendo techniques comprise both strikes and thrusts. Strikes are only made towards specified target areas (打突-部位, datotsu-bui) on the wrists, head, or body, all of which are protected by armor. The targets are men, sayu-men or Yoko-men (upper, left or right side of the men), the right kote at any time, the left kote when it is in a raised position, and the left or right side of the dō. Thrusts (突き, tsuki) are only allowed to the throat. However, since an incorrectly performed thrust could cause serious injury to the opponent's neck, thrusting techniques in free practice and competition are often restricted to senior dan graded kendōka.

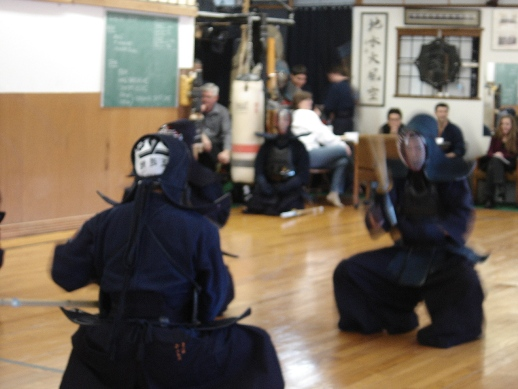
Kendōka perform sonkyo after combat.

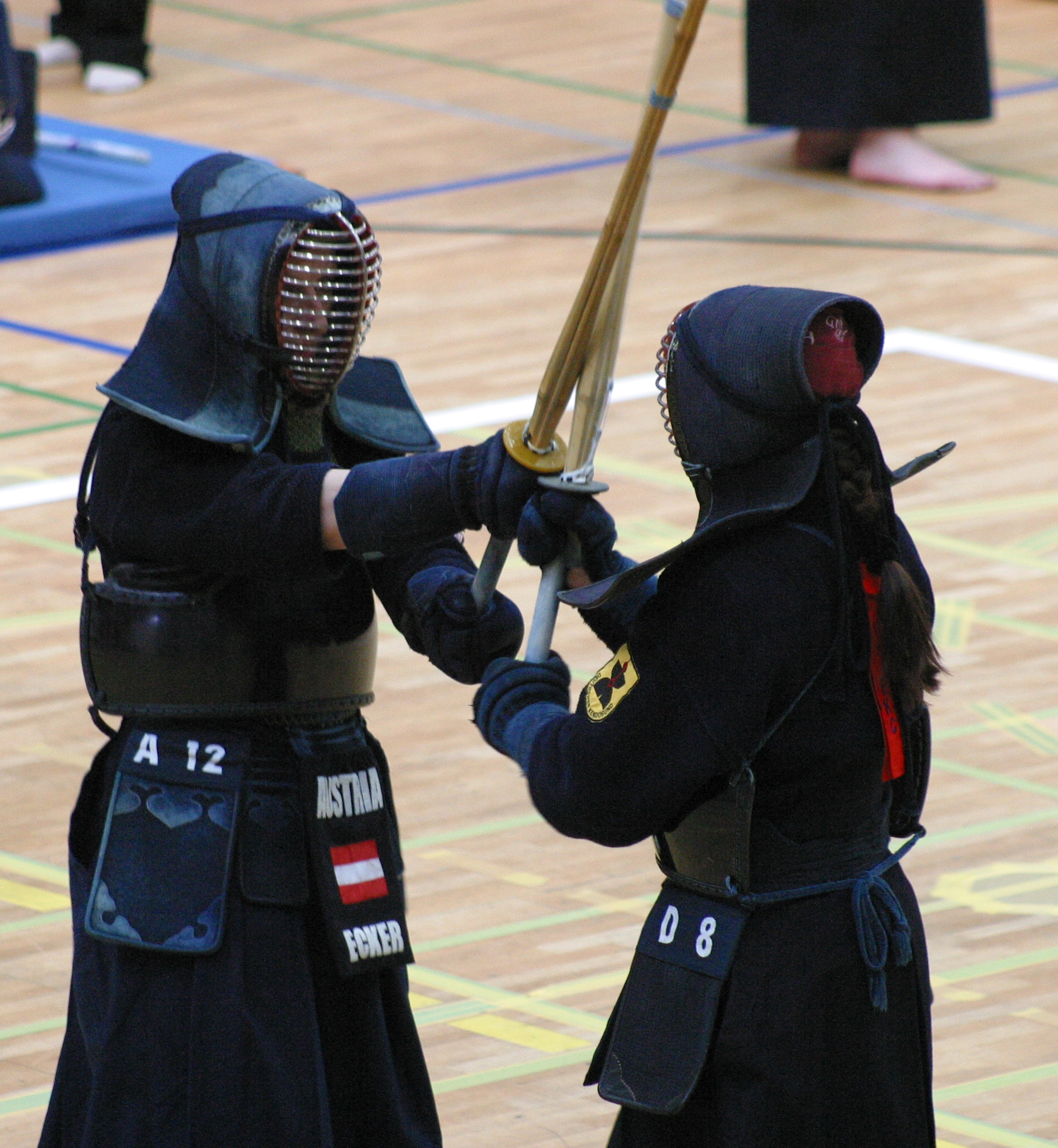
Two kendōka in tsuba zeriai

Kendo target areas, or datotsu-bui

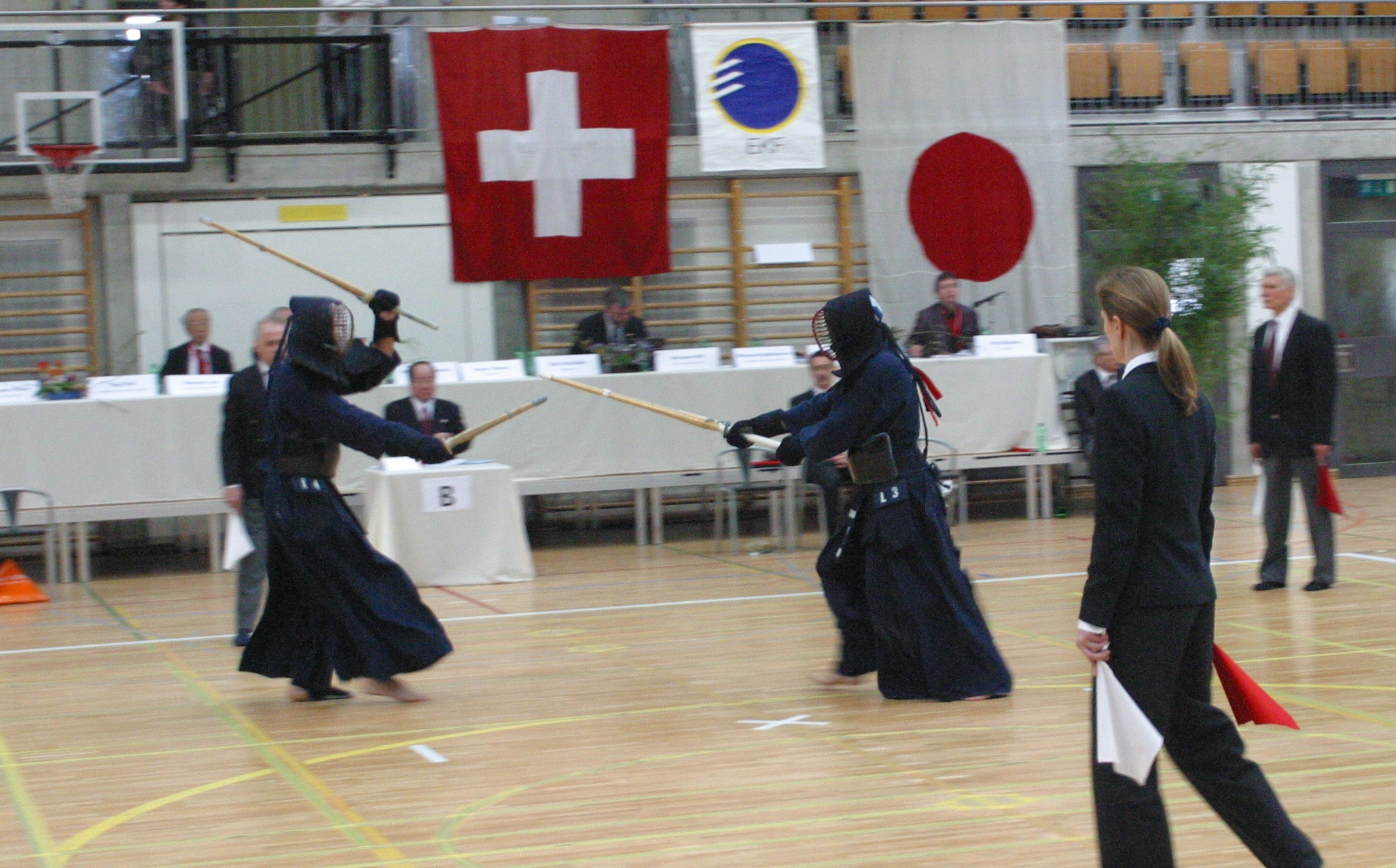
Two kendōka, one (left) is playing in nitō (two sword style) and the other (right) is playing in ittō (one sword style).

Once a kendōka begins practice in armor, a practice session may include any or all of the following types of practice:

Kirikaeshi (切り返し)
Striking the left and right men target points in succession; practicing centering, distance, and correct technique while building spirit and stamina.
Waza-geiko (技稽古)
Waza or technique practice in which the student learns and refines the techniques of kendo with a receiving partner.
Kakari-geiko (掛稽古)
Short, intense, attack practice which teaches continuous alertness and readiness to attack, as well as building spirit and stamina.
Ji-geiko (地稽古)
Undirected practice where the kendōka tries all that has been learned during practice against an opponent.
Gokaku-geiko (互角稽古)
Practice between two kendōka of similar skill level.
Hikitate-geiko (引立稽古)
Practice where a senior kendōka guides a junior through practice.
Shiai-geiko (試合稽古)
Competition practice which may also be judged.

== Techniques ==
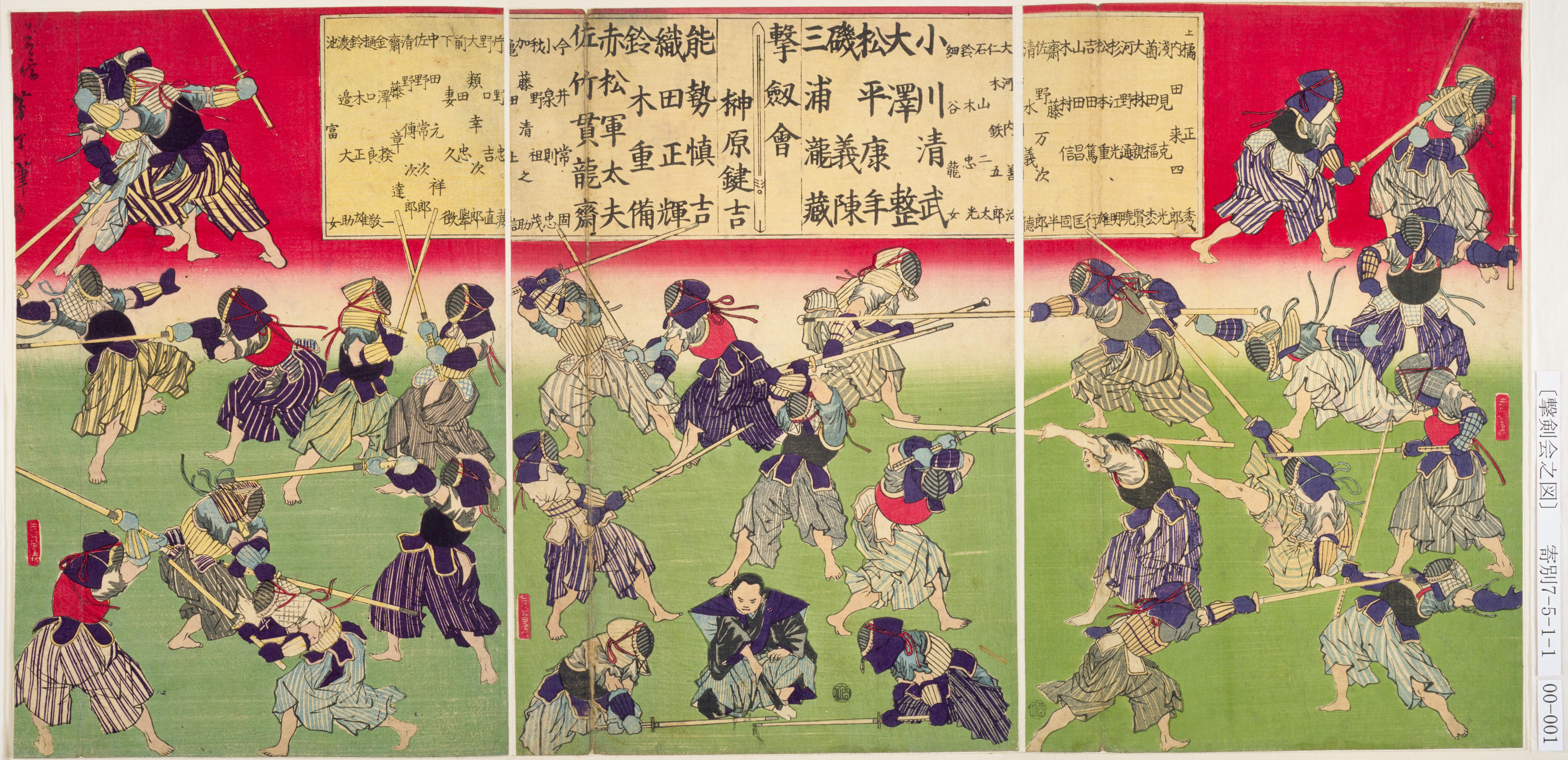
Kendo "Swordsmanship" by Yoshitoshi (1873)

Techniques are divided into shikake-waza (仕掛け技; to initiate a strike) and ōji-waza (応じ技; a response to an attempted strike). Kendōka who wish to use such techniques during practice or competitions often practice each technique with a motodachi. This is a process that requires patience. The kendōka and motodachi practice the technique slowly at first; as familiarity and confidence build, they increase the speed to the level used in matches and competitions.

=== Shikake-waza ===
These attack techniques are used to create an opening in an opponent by initiating an attack, or striking boldly when the opponent has created an opening. Such techniques include:

Tobikomi-waza (飛び込み技)

This is a technique used when one's opponent has weak kisei (spirit, vigor) or when they yield an opening under pressure. Always hold kisei and strike quickly.

Hikibana-waza (引き鼻技)

Body and shinai will lose balance as the initiator strikes or when being attacked. This technique takes advantage of this to help execute a strike. A good example is Hikibana-kote when a strike is made to an opponent's kote as they feel threatened and raise their kensen as the initiator pushes forward.

Katsugi-waza (担ぎ技)

This provides a surprise attack by lifting the shinai over the initiator's shoulder before striking. Here a skillful use of the kensen and spirited attack is crucial for effective katsugi-waza or luring the opponent into breaking their posture.

Nidan-waza (二段技)

There are two types. The first is for moving to the next waza after a failed first strike, and the second holds the opponent's attention and posture to create the opening for a second strike. The former requires a continuous rhythm of correct strikes. The latter requires continuous execution of waza, to take advantage of the opponent's opening.

Harai-waza (払い技)

This can be used if one's opponent's stance has no opening when the opponent tries to attack. The opponent's shinai is either knocked down from above or swept up from below with a resulting strike just when their stance is broken.

Debana-waza (出鼻技)

This technique involves striking the opponent as they are about to strike. This is because their concentration will be on striking and their posture will have no flexibility to respond. Thus debana-waza is ideal. This can be to any part of the opponent's body, with valid strikes being: debana-men, debana-kote, and debana-Tsuki.

=== Ōji-waza ===
These counter-attack techniques are performed by executing a strike after responding or avoiding an attempted strike by the opponent. This can also be achieved by inducing the opponent to attack, then employing one of the Ōji-waza.

Nuki-waza (抜き技)

Avoiding an attack from another, then instantly responding. Here, timing has to be correct. A response that is too slow or fast may not be effective. Therefore, close attention to an opponent's every move is required.

Suriage-waza (刷り上げ技)

If struck by an opponent's shinai, this technique sweeps up their shinai in a rising-slide motion, with the right (ura) or left (omote) side of the shinai. Then strike in the direction of their shinai, or at the opening resulting from their composure's collapse. This technique needs to be smooth. That is, do not separate the rising-slide motion and the upward-sweeping motion or it will not be successful. Valid strikes include: men-suriage-men, kote-suriage-men, men-suriage-do, kote-suriage-kote, and Tsuki-suriage-men.

Uchiotoshi-waza (撃落し技)

This waza knocks an opponent's shinai to the right or left. This neutralises a potential strike and gives the ideal chance to strike as an opponent is off-balance. For success, the distance between oneself and the opponent has to be correctly perceived, and then one knocks down their shinai before their arm fully extends. Valid strikes include: do-uchiotoshi-men and Tsuki-uchiotoshi-men.

Kaeshi-waza (返し技)

This technique is a response. As the opponent strikes, the opponent parries their shinai with the initiator's. They then flip over (turn over the hands) and strike their opposite side. Valid strikes include: men-kaeshi-men, men-kaeshi-kote, men-kaeshi-do, kote-kaeshi-men, kote-kaeshi-kote, and do-kaeshi-men.

== Rules of competition ==
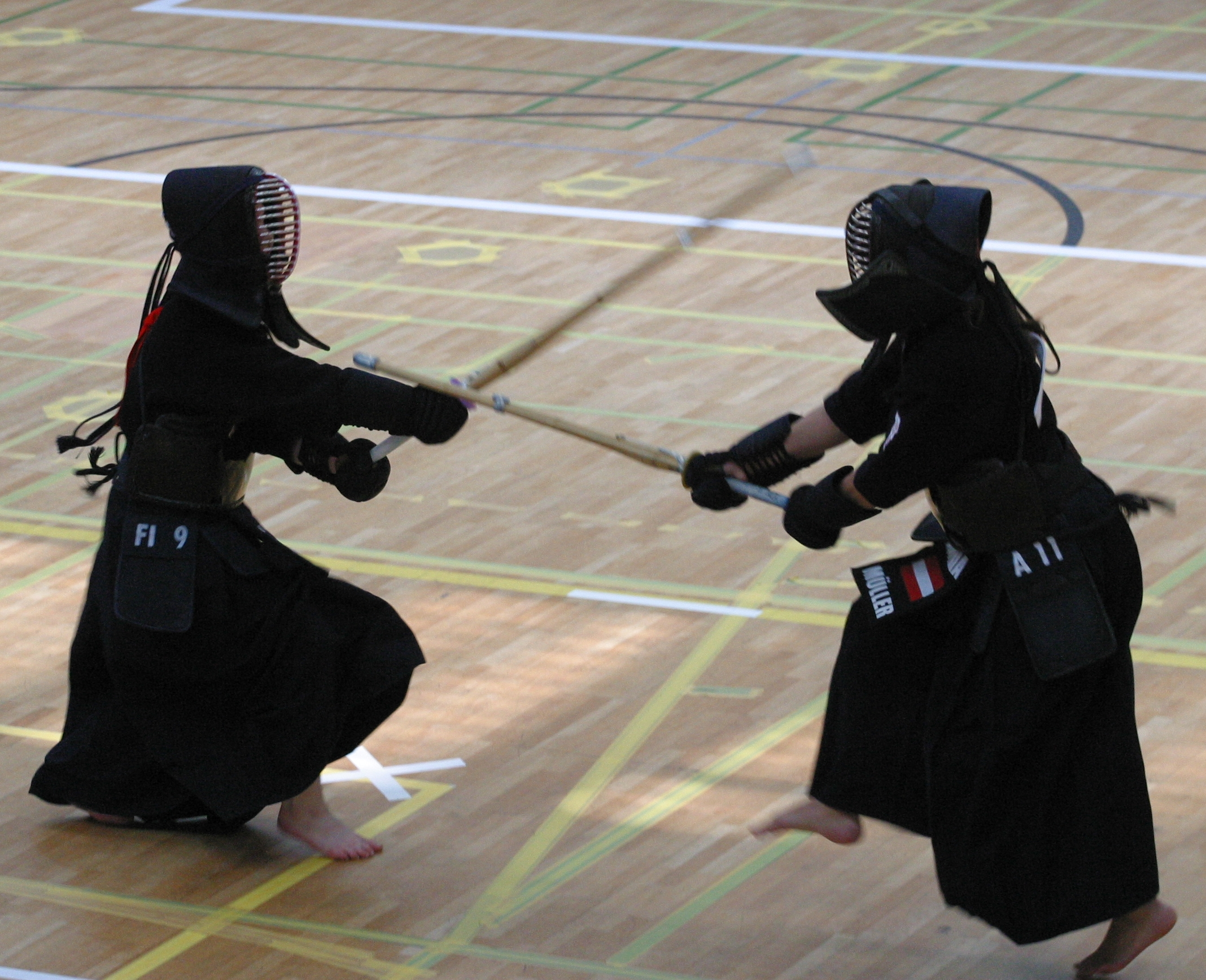
At the European Championships in Bern 2005. The kendōka to the right may have scored a point to the kote.

A scorable point (有効打突, yūkō-datotsu) in a kendo competition (tai-kai) is defined as an accurate strike or thrust made onto a datotsu-bui of the opponent's kendo-gu with the shinai making contact at its datotsu-bu, the competitor displaying high spirits, correct posture and followed by zanshin.

Datotsu-bui or point scoring targets in kendo are defined as:

- Men-bu, the top or sides of the head protector (sho-men and sayu-men).
- Kote-bu, a padded area of the right or left wrist protector (migi-kote and hidari-kote).
- Do-bu, an area of the right or left side of the armour that protects the torso (migi-do and hidari-do).
- Tsuki-bu, an area of the head protector in front of the throat (Tsuki-dare).

Datotsu-bu of the shinai is the forward, or blade side (jin-bu) of the top third (monouchi) of the shinai.

Zanshin (残心), or continuation of awareness, must be present and shown throughout the execution of the strike and the kendōka must be mentally and physically ready to attack again.

In competition, there are usually three referees (審判, shinpan). Each referee holds a red flag and a white flag in opposing hands. To award a point, a referee raises the flag corresponding to the color of the ribbon worn by the scoring competitor. Usually, at least two referees must agree for a point to be awarded. Play is stopped after each point is awarded.

Kendo competitions are usually a three-point match. The first competitor to score two points, therefore, wins the match. If the time limit is reached and only one competitor has a point, that competitor wins.

In the case of a tie, there are several options:

- Hiki-wake (引き分け): The match is declared a draw.
- Enchō (延長): The match is continued until either competitor scores a point.
- Hantei (判定): The victor is decided by the referees. The three referees vote for victor by each raising one of their respective flags simultaneously.

== Important kendo competitions ==
The All Japan Kendo Championship is regarded as the most prestigious kendo championship. Despite it being the national championship for only Japanese kendōka, kendo practitioners all over the world consider the All Japan Kendo Championship as the championship with the highest level of competitive kendo. The World Kendo Championships have been held every three years since 1970. They are organised by the International Kendo Federation (FIK) with the support of the host nation's kendo federation. The European championship is held every year, except in those years in which there is a world championship. Kendo is also one of the martial arts in the World Combat Games.

== Advancement ==
=== Grades ===
Technical achievement in kendo is measured by advancement in grade, rank or level. The kyū (級) and dan (段) grading system, created in 1883, is used to indicate one's proficiency in kendo. The dan levels are from first-dan (初段, sho-dan) to tenth-dan (十段, jū-dan). There are usually six grades below first-dan, known as kyu. The kyu numbering is in reverse order, with first kyu (一級, ikkyū) being the grade immediately below first dan, and sixth kyu (六級, rokkyū) being the lowest grade. There are no visible differences in dress between kendo grades; those below dan-level may dress the same as those above dan-level.

In Japan, kyu ranks are generally held by children. The exam for 1st kyu (ikkyū) is often their first exam and grade. Adults generally will do their 1st dan (shodan) as their first exam. In most other countries outside of Japan, kendoka go through every kyu rank before being eligible for dan ranks.

Eighth-dan (八段, hachi-dan) is the highest dan grade attainable through a test of physical kendo skills. In the AJKF, the grades of ninth-dan (九段, kyū-dan) and tenth dan (十段 (jū-dan)) are no longer awarded, but ninth-dan kendōka are still active in Japanese kendo. International Kendo Federation (FIK) grading rules allow national kendo organisations to establish a special committee to consider awarding these grades. Only five now-deceased kendōka were ever admitted to the rank of 10th-dan following the establishment in 1952 of the All Japan Kendo Federation. These five kendōka, all of whom were students of Naitō Takaharu at the Budo Senmon Gakko, are:

- Ogawa Kinnosuke 小川 金之助 (1884–1962) – awarded 1957
- Moriji Mochida (aka Mochida Moriji) 持田 盛二 (1885–1974) – awarded 1957
- Nakano Sousuke 中野 宗助 (1885–1963) – awarded 1957
- Saimura Gorou 斎村 五郎 (1887–1969) – awarded 1957
- Ooasa Yuuji 大麻 勇次 (1887–1974) – awarded 1962

All examination candidates face a panel of examiners. A larger, more qualified panel is usually assembled to assess the higher dan grades. Kendo examinations typically consist of jitsugi, a demonstration of the skill of the applicants, Nihon Kendo Kata, and a written exam. The eighth-dan kendo exam is extremely difficult, with a reported pass rate of less than 1 percent.

Requirements for dan grade examination within FIK affiliated organisations
Grade	Requirement	Age requirement
1-dan	1-kyū	At least 13 years old
2-dan	At least 1 year of training after receiving 1-dan	
3-dan	At least 2 years of training after receiving 2-dan	
4-dan	At least 3 years of training after receiving 3-dan	
5-dan	At least 4 years of training after receiving 4-dan	
6-dan	At least 5 years of training after receiving 5-dan	
7-dan	At least 6 years of training after receiving 6-dan	
8-dan	At least 10 years of training after receiving 7-dan	At least 46 years old

=== Titles ===
Titles (称号, shōgō) can be earned in addition to the above dan grades by kendōka of a defined dan grade. These are renshi (錬士), kyōshi (教士), and hanshi (範士). The title is affixed to the front of the dan grade when said, for example renshi roku-dan (錬士六段). The qualifications for each title are below.

Title	Required grade	Conditions
renshi (錬士)	6-dan	After receiving 6-dan, one must wait 1 or more years, pass screening by the kendo organization, receive a recommendation from the regional organization president then pass an exam on kendo theory.
kyōshi (教士)	renshi 7-dan	After receiving 7-dan, one must wait 2 or more years, pass screening by the kendo organization, and receive a recommendation from the regional organization president, then pass an exam on kendo theory.
hanshi (範士)	kyōshi 8-dan	After receiving 8-dan, one must wait 8 or more years, pass screening by the kendo organization, receive a recommendation from the regional organization president and the national kendo organization president, then pass an exam on kendo theory.

== Kata ==
Kata are fixed patterns that teach kendōka the basic elements of swordsmanship. The kata include fundamental techniques of attacking and counter-attacking, and have useful practical application in general kendo. There are ten Nihon Kendō Kata (日本剣道形). These are generally practiced with wooden swords (木刀, bokutō or bokken). Occasionally, real swords or swords with a blunt edge, called kata-yō (形用) or ha-biki (刃引), may be used for display of kata.

All are performed by two people: the uchidachi (打太刀), the teacher, and shidachi (仕太刀), the student. The uchidachi makes the first move or attack in each kata. As this is a teaching role, the uchidachi is always the losing side, thus allowing the shidachi to learn and to gain confidence.

Kata one to seven are performed with both partners using a normal length wooden sword. Kata eight to ten are performed with uchidachi using a normal length weapon and shidachi using a shorter one (kodachi).

The forms of the Nihon Kendō Kata (日本剣道形) were finalized in 1933 based on the Dai nihon Teikoku Kendo Kata, composed in 1912. It is impossible to link the individual forms of Dai nihon Teikoku Kendo Kata to their original influences, although the genealogical reference diagram does indicate the masters of the various committees involved, and it is possible from this to determine the influences and origins of Kendo and the Kata.

In 2003, the All Japan Kendo Federation introduced Bokutō Ni Yoru Kendō Kihon-waza Keiko-hō (木刀による剣道基本技稽古法), a set of basic exercises using a bokuto. This form of practice is intended primarily for kendōka up to second dan (二段, ni-dan), but is very useful for all kendo students who are organized under FIK.

Kata can also be treated as competitions where players are judged upon their performance and technique.

== National and international organizations ==
Many national and regional organizations manage and promote kendo activities outside Japan. The major organizing body is the International Kendo Federation (FIK). The FIK is a non-governmental international federation of national and regional kendo organisations. An aim of the FIK is to provide a link between Japan and the international kendo community and to promote and popularize kendo, iaido and jodo. The FIK was established in 1970 with 17 national federations. The number of affiliated and recognized organizations has increased over the years to 57 (as of May 2015). The FIK is recognized by SportAccord as a 'Full Member', and is also recognized by the World Anti-Doping Agency.

Other organizations that promote the study of Japanese martial arts, including kendo, are the Dai Nippon Butoku Kai (DNBK) and the International Martial Arts Federation (IMAF). The current DNBK has no connection to the pre-war organization, although it shares the same goals. The International Martial Arts Federation (IMAF) was established in Kyoto in 1952 and is dedicated to the promotion and development of the martial arts worldwide, including kendo.

== See also ==
- Chanbara
- Angampora
- Banshay
- Bataireacht
- Bōjutsu
- Buhurt
- Fencing
- Gatka
- Gendai budō – modern Japanese martial arts
- Geography of kendo
- Iaidō – sword drawing
- Jōdō – a martial art using a short wooden staff, or stick
- Jūkendō
- Kalaripayattu
- Kenjutsu
- Krabi–krabong
- Kumdo – Korean kendo
- Kuttu Varisai
- Mardani khel
- Miyamoto Musashi
- Miyamoto Musashi Budokan
- Naginata – a martial art using a glave-like weapon
- Silambam
- Silambam Asia
- Swordsmanship
- Tahtib
- Thang-ta
- Varma kalai
- World Silambam Association
