= Gangster =

Member of a criminal gang

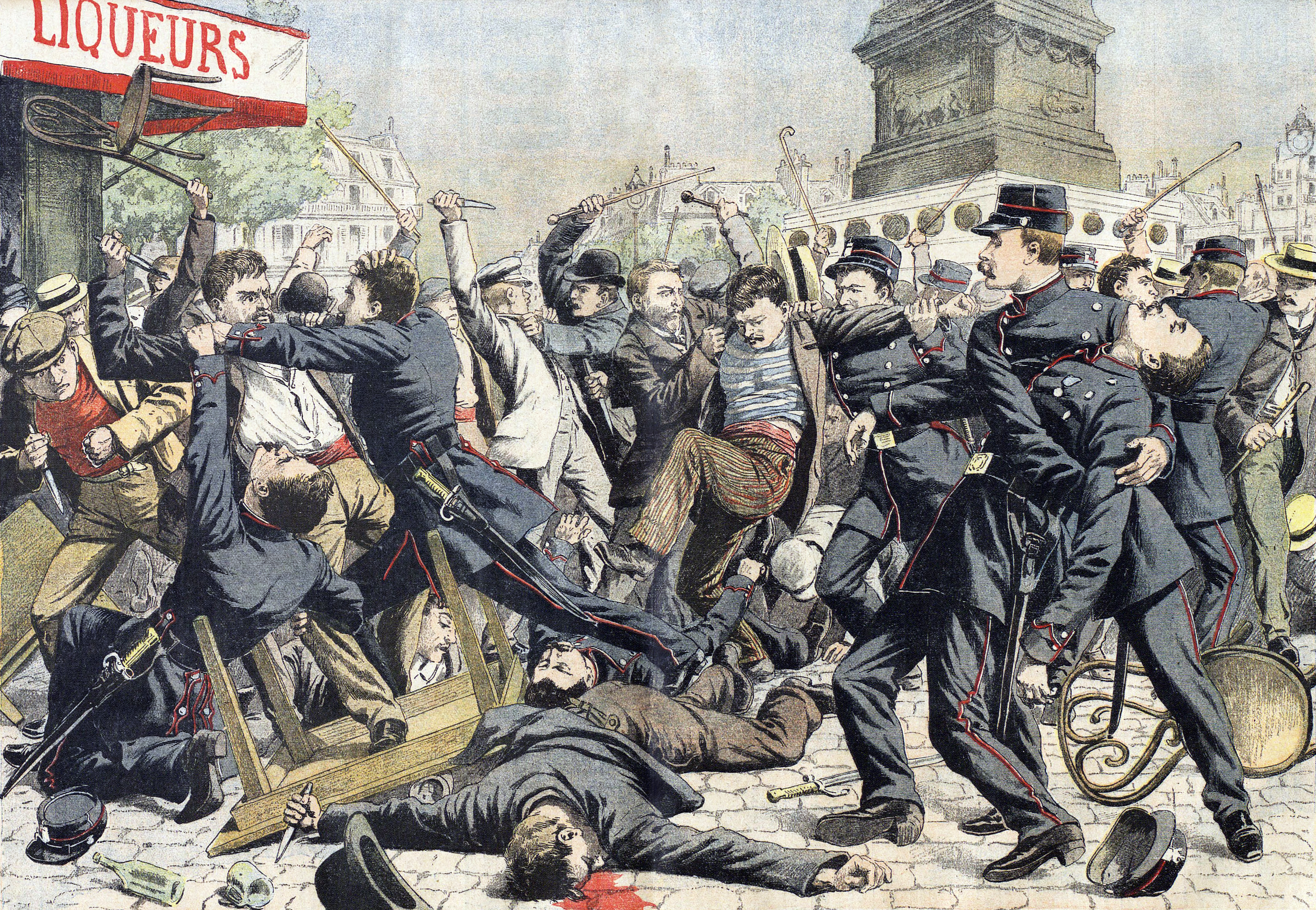
Apache gangsters battle Paris Police on 14 August 1904

A gangster (informally gangsta) is a criminal who is a member of a gang. In some cases, gangsters are also called mobsters, a term derived from mob and the suffix -ster. Gangsters usually aim to collectively profit off of their criminal activities with their associates.

== Usage ==
In modern usage, the term "gang" is generally used for a group of criminals and the term "gangster" invariably describes an individual criminal. Much has been written on the subject of gangs, although there is no clear consensus about what constitutes a gang or what situations lead to gang formation and evolution. There is agreement that the members of a gang have a sense of common identity and belonging, which is typically reinforced through shared activities and visual identifications such as special clothing, tattoos, colors, or rings. Some preconceptions may be false. For example, the common view that illegal drug distribution in the United States is largely controlled by gangs has been questioned.

A gang may be a relatively small group of people who cooperate in criminal acts, as with the Jesse James gang, which ended with the leader's death in 1882. However, a gang may also be a larger group with a formal organization that survives the death of its leader. For example, each of the Five Families founded in the early 20th century, outlasted its founders and have survived into the 21st century. Large and well structured gangs such as the Mafia, drug cartels, Triads, Crips, Bloods, or even outlaw motorcycle gangs can undertake complex transactions that would be far beyond the capability of one individual, and can provide services such as dispute arbitration and contract enforcement that parallel those of a legitimate government.

The term "organized crime" is associated with gangs and gangsters, but is not synonymous. A small street gang that engages in sporadic low-level crime would not be seen as "organized". An organization that coordinates gangs in different countries involved in the international trade in drugs or prostitutes may not be considered a "gang".

== Regional variants ==
=== Europe ===
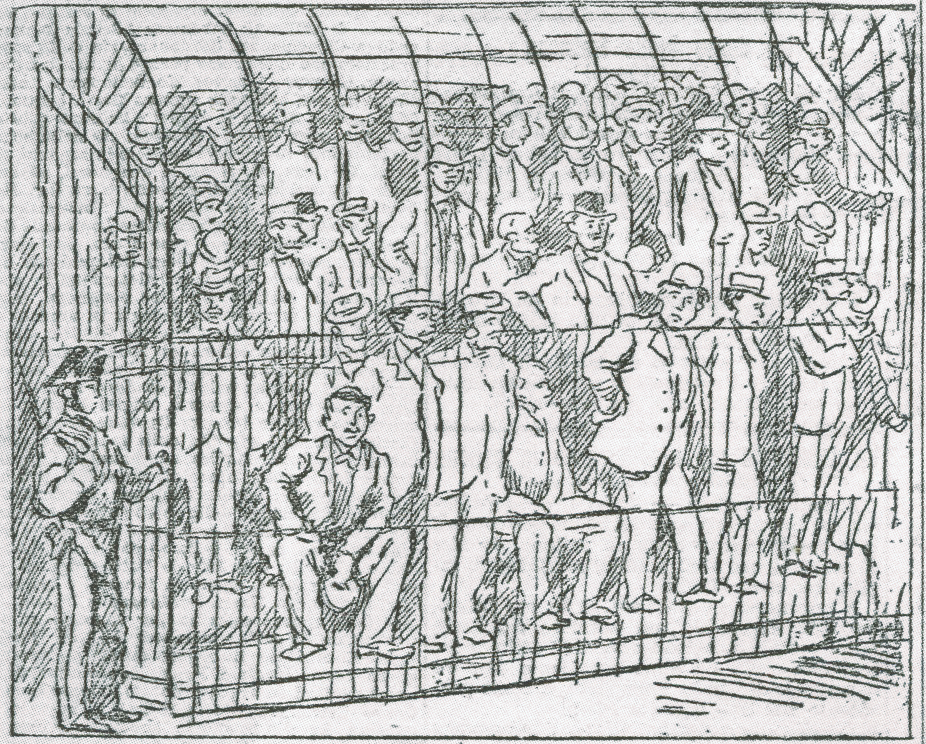
Sketch of the 1901 maxi trial of suspected mafiosi in Palermo. From the newspaper L'Ora, May 1901.

There are several organized crime groups in Italy. Notably, the Sicilian Mafia, or Cosa Nostra is a criminal syndicate that emerged in the mid-nineteenth century in Sicily, Italy. It is a loose association of criminal groups that share common organizational structure and code of conduct. The origins lie in the upheaval of Sicily's transition out of feudalism in 1812 and its later annexation by mainland Italy in 1860. Under feudalism, the nobility owned most of the land and enforced law and order through their private armies. After 1812, the feudal barons steadily sold off or rented their lands to private citizens. Primogeniture was abolished, land could no longer be seized to settle debts, and one fifth of the land was to become private property of the peasants. Other similarly large and powerful Italian criminal organizations, often composed of smaller gangs or "clans" generally operating under a shared criminal subculture or code, include the Camorra in Naples and Campania and the Ndrangheta in Calabria.

In the period of Soviet Union, Vory v Zakone emerged, a class of criminals that had to abide by certain rules in the prison system. One such rule was that cooperation with the authorities of any kind was forbidden. During World War II some prisoners made a deal with the government to join the armed forces in return for a reduced sentence, but upon their return to prison they were attacked and killed by inmates who remained loyal to the rules of the thieves. In 1988, the Soviet Union legalized private enterprise but did not provide regulations to ensure the security of market economy. Crude markets emerged, the most notorious being the Rizhsky market where prostitution rings were run next to the Rizhsky Railway Station in Moscow.

As the Soviet Union headed for collapse many former government workers turned to crime, while others moved overseas. Former KGB agents and veterans of the Afghan and First and Second Chechen Wars, now unemployed but with experience that could prove useful in crime, joined the increasing crime wave. At first, the Vory v Zakone played a key role in arbitrating the gang wars that erupted in the 1990s. By the mid-1990s it was believed that "Don" Semion Mogilevich had become the "boss of all bosses" of most Russian Mafia syndicates in the world, described by the British government as "one of the most dangerous men in the world". More recently, criminals with stronger ties to big business and the government have displaced the Vory from some of their traditional niches, although the Vory are still strong in gambling and the retail trade.

The Albanian Mafia is active in Albania, the United States, and the European Union (EU) countries, participating in a diverse range of criminal enterprises including drug and arms trafficking. The people of the mountainous country of Albania have always had strong traditions of family and clan loyalty, in some ways similar to that of southern Italy. Ethnic Albanian gangs have grown rapidly since 1992 during the prolonged period of instability in the Balkans after the collapse of Yugoslavia. This coincided with large scale migration throughout Europe and to the United States and Canada. Although based in Albania, the gangs often handle international transactions such as trafficking in economic migrants, drugs and other contraband, and weapons. Other criminal organizations that emerged in the Balkans around this time are popularly called the Serbian Mafia, Bosnian Mafia, Bulgarian Mafia, and so on.

=== Asia ===
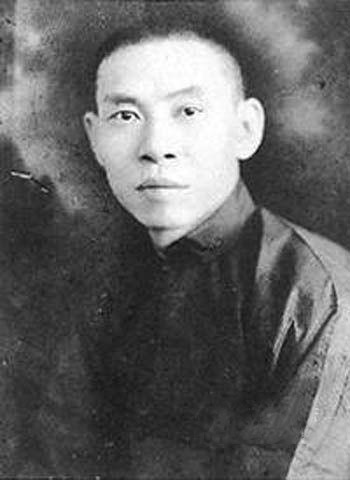
Du Yuesheng (1888–1951), a Chinese gangster and important Kuomintang supporter who spent much of his life in Shanghai

In China, Triads trace their roots to resistance or rebel groups opposed to Manchu rule during the Qing dynasty, which were given the triangle as their emblem. The first record of a triad society, Heaven and Earth Gathering, dates to the Lin Shuangwen uprising on Taiwan from 1786 to 1787. The triads evolved into criminal societies. When the Chinese Communist Party came to power in 1949 in mainland China, law enforcement became stricter and tough governmental crackdown on criminal organizations forced the triads to migrate to Hong Kong, then a British colony, and other cities around the world. Triads today are highly organized, with departments responsible for functions such as accounting, recruiting, communications, training and welfare in addition to the operational arms. They engage in a variety of crimes including extortion, money laundering, smuggling, trafficking and prostitution.

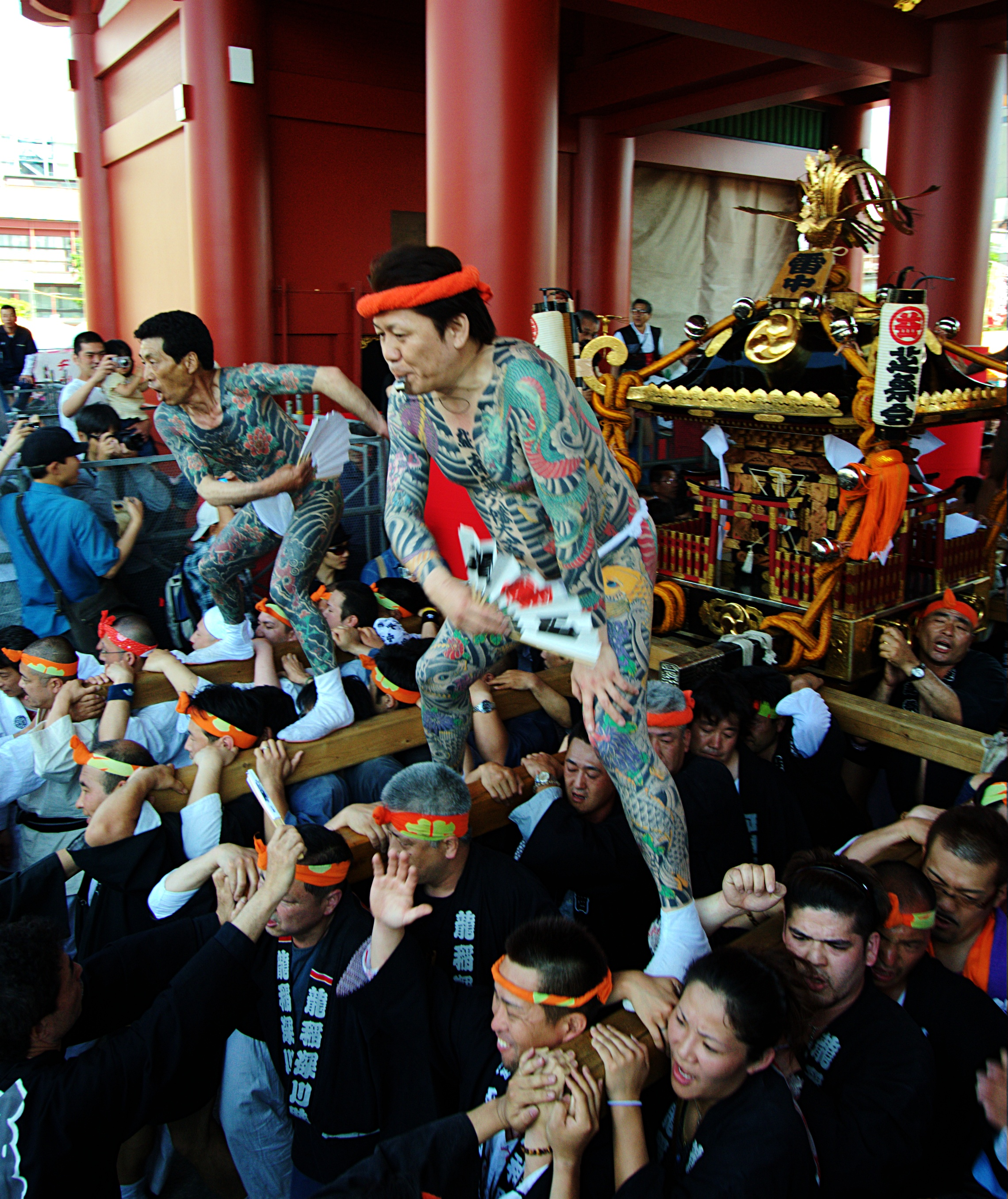
Yakuza, or Japanese mafia, are not allowed to show their tattoos in public except during the Sanja Matsuri festival.

Yakuza are members of traditional organized crime syndicates in Japan. They are notorious for their strict codes of conduct and very organized nature. As of 2009 they had an estimated 80,900 members. Most modern yakuza derive from two classifications which emerged in the mid-Edo period: tekiya, those who primarily peddled illicit, stolen or shoddy goods; and bakuto, those who were involved in or participated in gambling.

=== United States and Canada ===
In the late 1860s, many Chinese people emigrated to the United States, escaping from insecurity and economic hardship at home, at first working on the west coast and later moving east. The new immigrants formed Chinese Benevolent Associations. In some cases these evolved into Tongs, or criminal organizations primarily involved in gambling. Members of Triads who migrated to the United States often joined these tongs. With a new wave of migration in the 1960s, street gangs began to flourish in major cities. The Tongs recruited these gangs to protect their extortion, gambling and narcotics operations.

As American society and culture developed, new immigrants were relocating to the United States. The first major gangs in 19th century New York City were the Irish gangs such as the Whyos and the Dead Rabbits. These were followed by the Italian Five Points Gang and later a Jewish gang known as the Eastman Gang. There were also "Nativist" anti-immigration gangs such as the Bowery Boys. The Italian-American Mafia arose from offshoots of the Mafia that emerged in the United States during the late 19th century, following waves of emigration from Sicily. There were similar offshoots in Canada among Italian Canadians, such as the Rizzuto crime family.

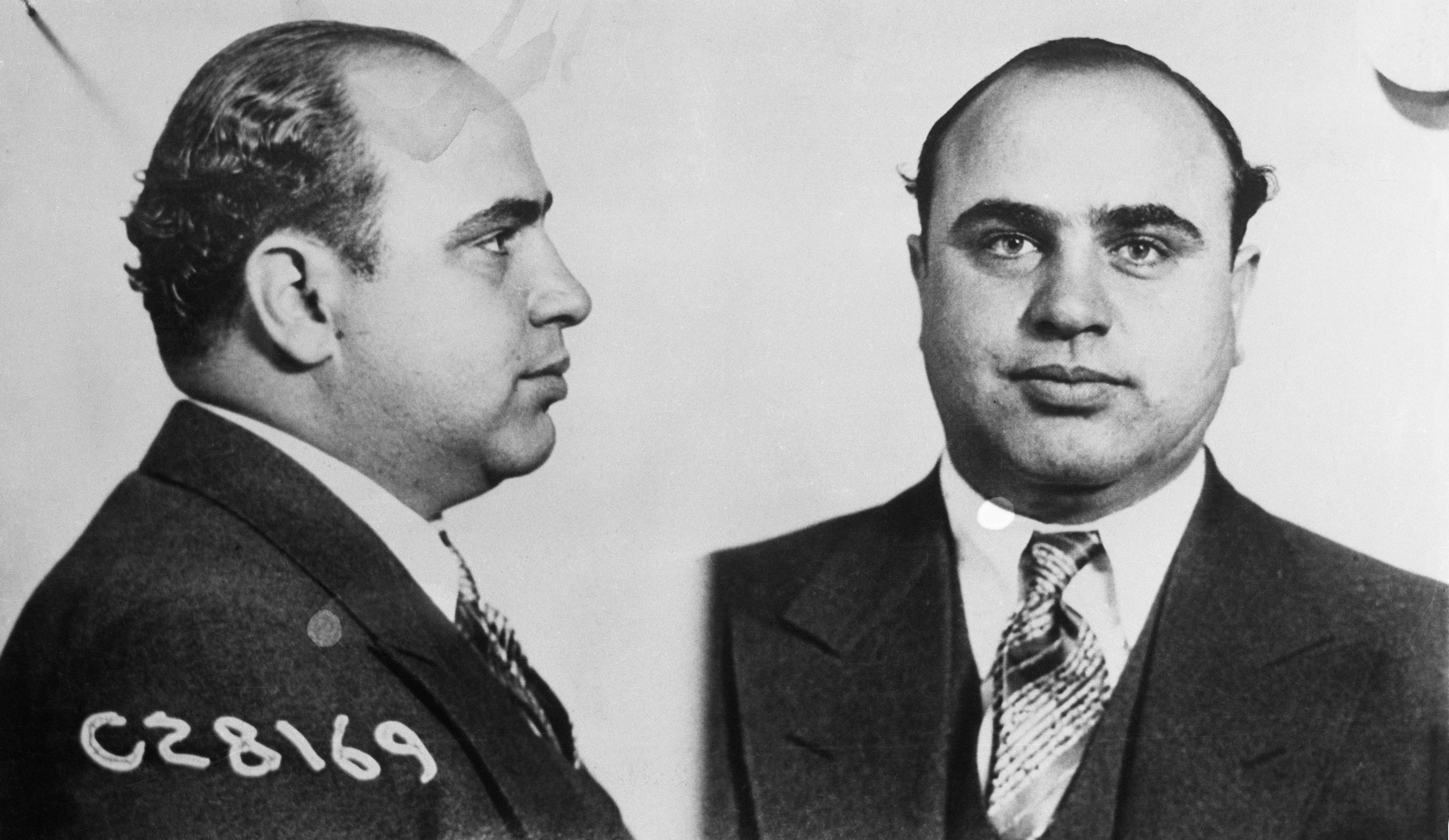
Mug shot of Al Capone. Although never convicted of racketeering, Capone was a protégé and successor of Torrio, later convicted of income tax evasion by the federal government.

The terms "gangster" and "mobster" are mostly used in the United States to refer to members of criminal organizations associated with Prohibition. In 1920, the Eighteenth Amendment of the United States Constitution banned the sale, manufacture, and transportation of alcohol for consumption. Many gangs sold alcohol illegally for profit, and used acute violence to stake turf and protect their interest. Often, police officers and politicians were paid off or extorted to ensure continued operation. Al Capone was one of these notorious gangsters during the Depression era for the Chicago Outfit. Capone would rise to control a major portion of illicit activity such as gambling, prostitution, and bootlegging in Chicago during the early 20th century.

In New York City, by the end of the 1920s, two factions of organized crime had emerged to fight for control of the criminal underworld, one led by Joe Masseria and the other by Salvatore Maranzano. This caused the Castellammarese War, which led to Masseria's murder in 1931. Maranzano then divided New York City into five families. Maranzano, the first leader of the American Mafia, established the code of conduct for the organization, set up the "family" divisions and structure, and established procedures for resolving disputes. In an unprecedented move, Maranzano set himself up as boss of all bosses and required all families to pay tribute to him. This new role was received negatively, and Maranzano was murdered within six months on the orders of Charles "Lucky" Luciano. Luciano was a former Masseria underling who had switched sides to Maranzano and orchestrated the killing of Masseria. As an alternative to the previous despotic Mafia practice of naming a single Mafia boss as capo di tutti capi, or "boss of all bosses", Luciano created The Commission in 1931, where the bosses of the most powerful families would have equal say and vote on important matters and solve disputes between families. This group ruled over the National Crime Syndicate and brought in an era of peace and prosperity for the American Mafia.

=== Latin America ===
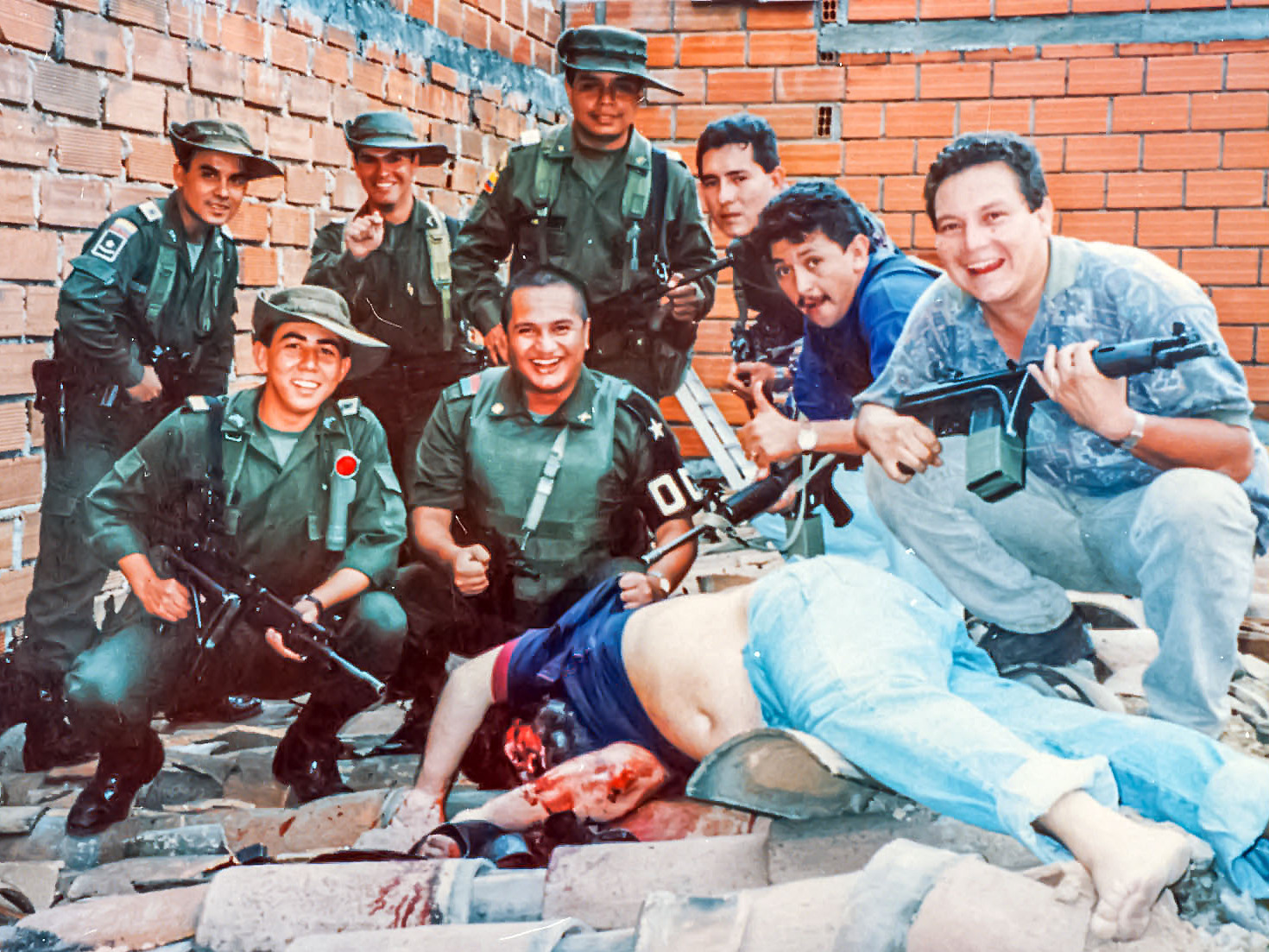
Members of Colonel Martinez's Search Bloc celebrate over Pablo Escobar's body on December 2, 1993.

Most cocaine is grown and processed in South America, particularly in Colombia, Bolivia, Peru, and smuggled into the United States and Europe, the United States being the world's largest consumer of cocaine. Colombia is the world's leading producer of cocaine, and also produces heroin that is mostly destined for the US market. The Medellín Cartel was an organized network of drug suppliers and smugglers originating in the city of Medellín, Colombia. The gang operated in Colombia, Bolivia, Peru, Central America, the United States, as well as Canada and Europe throughout the 1970s and 1980s. It was founded and run by Ochoa Vázquez brothers with Pablo Escobar. By 1993, the Colombian government, helped by the US, had successfully dismantled the cartel by imprisoning or hunting and gunning down its members.

Although Mexican drug cartels, or drug trafficking organizations, have existed for several decades, they have become more powerful since the demise of Colombia's Cali and Medellín cartels in the 1990s. Mexican drug cartels now dominate the wholesale illicit drug market in the United States. Sixty five percent of cocaine enters the United States through Mexico, and the vast majority of the rest enters through Florida. Cocaine shipments from South America transported through Mexico or Central America are generally moved over land or by air to staging sites in northern Mexico. The cocaine is then broken down into smaller loads for smuggling across the U.S.–Mexico border. Arrests of key gang leaders, particularly in the Tijuana and Gulf cartels, have led to increasing drug violence as gangs fight for control of the trafficking routes into the United States.

Cocaine traffickers from Colombia, and recently Mexico, have also established a labyrinth of smuggling routes throughout the Caribbean, the Bahama Island chain, and South Florida. They often hire traffickers from Mexico or the Dominican Republic to transport the drug. The traffickers use a variety of smuggling techniques to transfer their drug to U.S. markets. These include airdrops of 500–700 kg in the Bahama Islands or off the coast of Puerto Rico, mid-ocean boat-to-boat transfers of 500–2,000 kg, and the commercial shipment of tonnes of cocaine through the port of Miami. Another route of cocaine traffic goes through Chile, this route is primarily used for cocaine produced in Bolivia since the nearest seaports lie in northern Chile. The arid Bolivia-Chile border is easily crossed by 4x4 vehicles that then head to the seaports of Iquique and Antofagasta.

== In popular culture ==
Gangs have long been the subject of movies. In fact, the first feature-length movie ever produced was The Story of the Kelly Gang (1906), an Australian production that traced the life of the outlaw Ned Kelly (1855–1880). The United States has profoundly influenced the genre, but other cultures have contributed distinctive and often excellent gangster movies.

=== United States ===
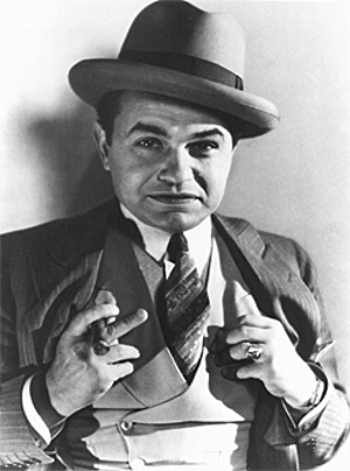
The actor Edward G. Robinson starred in several American gangster movies.

The stereotypical image and myth of the American gangster is closely associated with organized crime during the Prohibition era of the 1920s and 1930s.

The classic gangster movie ranks with the Western as one of the most successful creations of the American movie industry. The "classic" form of gangster movie, rarely produced in recent years, tells of a gangster working his way up through his enterprise and daring, until his organization collapses while he is at the peak of his powers. Although the ending is presented as a moral outcome, it is usually seen as no more than an accidental failure. The gangster is typically articulate, although at times lonely and depressed, and his worldly wisdom and defiance of social norms has a strong appeal, particularly to adolescents.

The years 1931 and 1932 saw the genre produce three classics: Warner Bros.' Little Caesar and The Public Enemy, which made screen icons out of Edward G. Robinson and James Cagney, and Howard Hughes' Scarface starring Paul Muni, which offered a dark psychological analysis of a fictionalized Al Capone. These films chronicle the quick rise, and equally quick downfall, of three young, violent criminals, and represent the genre in its purest form before moral pressure would force it to change and evolve. Though the gangster in each film would face a violent downfall which was designed to remind the viewers of the consequences of crime, audiences were often able to identify with the charismatic anti-hero. Those suffering from the Depression were able to relate to the gangster character who worked hard to earn his place and success in the world, only to have it all taken away from him.

=== Latin America ===
Latin American gangster movies are known for their gritty realism. Soy un delincuente (English: I Am a Criminal) is a 1976 Venezuelan film by director Clemente de la Cerda. The film tells the story of Ramón Antonio Brizuela, a real-life individual, who since childhood has to deal with rampant violence and the drugs, sex and petty thievery of a Caracas slum. Starting with delinquency, Ramón moves on to serious gang activity and robberies. He grows into a tough, self-confident young man who is hardened to violence. His views change when his fiancée's brother is killed in a robbery. The film was a blockbuster hit in Venezuela.

City of God (Portuguese: Cidade de Deus) is a 2002 Brazilian crime drama film directed by Fernando Meirelles and co-directed by Kátia Lund, released in its home country in 2002 and worldwide in 2003. All the characters existed in reality, and the story is based on real events. It depicts the growth of organized crime in the Cidade de Deus suburb of Rio de Janeiro, between the end of the '60s and the beginning of the '80s, with the closure of the film depicting the war between the drug dealer Li'l Zé and criminal Knockout Ned. The film received four Academy Award nominations in 2004.

=== East Asia ===
The first yakuza (gangster) film made in Japan was Bakuto (Gambler, 1964). The genre soon became popular, and by the 1970s the Japanese film industry was turning out a hundred mostly low-budget yakuza films each year. The films are descendants of the samurai epics, and are closer to Westerns than to Hollywood gangster movies. The hero is typically torn between compassion for the oppressed and his sense of duty to the gang. The plots are generally highly stylized, starting with the protagonist being released from prison and ending in a gory sword fight in which he dies an honorable death.

Although some Hong Kong gangster movies are simply vehicles for violent action, the mainstream movies in the genre deal with Triad societies portrayed as quasi-benign organizations. The movie gangster applies the Taoist principles of balance and honor to his conduct. The plots are often similar to those of Hollywood gangster movies, often ending with the fall of the subject of the movie at the hands of another gangster, but such a fall is far less important than a fall from honor. The first movie made by the acclaimed director Wong Kar-wai was a gangster movie, As Tears Go By. In it the protagonist finds himself torn between his desire for a woman and his loyalty to a fellow gangster. Infernal Affairs (2002) is a thriller about a police officer who infiltrates a triad and a triad member who infiltrates the police department. The film was remade by Martin Scorsese as The Departed.

Gangster films make up one of the most profitable segments of the South Korean film industry. Films made in the 1960s were often influenced by Japanese yakuza films, dealing with internal conflict between members of a gang or external conflict with other gangs. The gangsters' code of conduct and loyalty are important elements. Starting in the 1970s, strict censorship caused decline in the number and quality of gangster movies, and none were made in the 1980s. In the late 1980s and early 1990s there was a surge of imports of action movies from Hong Kong. The first of the new wave of important home grown gangster movies was Im Kwon-taek's General's Son (1990). Although this movie followed the earlier tradition, it was followed by a series of sophisticated gangster noirs set in contemporary urban locations, such as A Bittersweet Life (2005).

== See also ==
- Gang
- Dacoity
- Organized crime
- Banditry
- Racketeering
- List of crime bosses
- List of mobsters by city
