= Saint John Exhibition =

- Genre: Provincial fair/Agricultural and entertainment
- Dates: August
- Frequency: Annually
- Location: Exhibition Park in Saint John, New Brunswick
- Founded: 1889
- Website: http://www.exhibitionparksj.com

The Saint John Exhibition, formerly known as the Atlantic National Exhibition, is an annual exhibition held in Saint John, New Brunswick. The exhibition includes an agricultural fair, midway, entertainment, harness racing and other attractions.

== History ==
The Atlantic National Exhibition was first held at the Barrack Green in Saint John's South End, where it took place until 1938. The exhibition was cancelled during World War II and did not resume until 1954. It was then relocated to its present location in Saint John's East End. Amusement rides were provided by Bill Lynch Shows from 1954 to 1988. The exhibition also featured, horse races, auto racing, sideshows and peep shows. During the 1950s the event attracted 100,000 weekly visitors.
