= Mako Nishimura =

Japanese yakuza member (born 1966)

- 西村まこ
- Born: 1966 (age 59–60); Aichi Prefecture, Japan
- Citizenship: Japan

Mako Nishimura (西村まこ, born in 1966; Aichi Prefecture, Japan) is a former Japanese criminal who spent 30 years in the yakuza and was possibly the only woman accepted into the criminal syndicate. In 2012, she left her criminal life behind and began helping former offenders trying to reintegrate into society.

Mako published an autobiography in which she recounts her past to discourage others from joining gangs and to help eradicate yakuza culture. Her story is a rare example of a woman in the strictly patriarchal world of Japanese organized crime. She works with “Gojinkai, an NGO helping other yakuza leave the criminal life”.

== Biography ==
She was born and raised in a family of civil servants. Her father was strict and used corporal punishment. In middle school, seeking to escape the control of her authoritarian father, Mako began spending time with peers from disadvantaged families, and by the age of 18 she had joined a bōsōzoku gang, where she learned to fight well. She was arrested twice, but since she was a minor, her detention periods were short.

Because of her arrests, her family disowned her, and Mako entered into a relationship with a young yakuza member who taught her the basics of the criminal business — how to collect money for protection and dispute resolution, engage in racketeering, and recruit girls for prostitution. One night, her lover walked into an ambush by a rival gang; he was caught off guard in a bar and needed help. Mako stepped into the fight to defend him, acting with such fury and brutality that rumors about her spread quickly and reached the oyabun (boss) of a local yakuza clan, who asked to meet her. He was so impressed that, despite her gender, he offered her a place in his group as a trainee fighter. Mako accepted. She was 20 at the time.

To earn respect in a male-dominated world, she had to behave like any other yakuza member. She engaged in extortion, drug dealing, pimping, debt collection, fighting, and mediating disputes between rival groups. She became known for her violent tendencies and claims that no man ever beat her in a fight. Eventually, dressed in a man's kimono, she underwent sakazuki (a ceremony of acceptance into the yakuza, which consists of a ritual exchange of sake with the oyabun) and swore to follow the yakuza path.

Early in her criminal career, she earned the nickname “master of finger-cutting” after she unhesitatingly severed a joint of her little finger in the apology ritual known as yubitsume, taking responsibility for a collective mistake. According to Mako, she more than once assisted other yakuza who lacked the nerve to perform the ritual themselves.

In 1986, she was arrested after a fight and sentenced to three years in prison with a five-year suspended sentence. In 1987, she was arrested for drug possession and sentenced to two years and six months in prison. National Police Agency officially recognizes yakuza factions and their members, and thus Mako was formally recognized by the state as a female yakuza — the first such case in history. After her release, she returned to criminal activity, though it had begun to weigh on her.

By the late 1990s, methamphetamine sales had become her clan's main business, and as a result she herself developed a severe drug addiction. In addition, Mako entered into a relationship with a yakuza member from a rival group and became pregnant by him. Hoping to start a new life and devote herself to raising her son, she left the clan and attempted to find regular work, but failed. Her shortened little finger and yakuza past — marked by tattoos — frightened potential employers. She managed to find work twice but was soon dismissed on pretexts. Despite her efforts, she was forced to return to drug dealing and pimping.

After the father of her child became an oyabun, he proposed to her, and they married. Mako reentered the yakuza world, this time as an anesan, the boss's wife. Their marriage lasted until 2010; they had a second child, but severe quarrels eventually led Mako to divorce her husband, who obtained custody of both sons. She rejoined her old clan, but two years later she left it, disillusioned with the yakuza and determined to change her life.

She now lives alone in Gifu Prefecture, trying to gain social acceptance and help others. She works at a house-demolition company. She also serves as the head of a branch of Gojinkai (五仁會), a charitable organization that provides assistance to former criminals, prisoners, drug addicts, and anyone else in need.
