= Naitō Takaharu =

Japanese martial artist

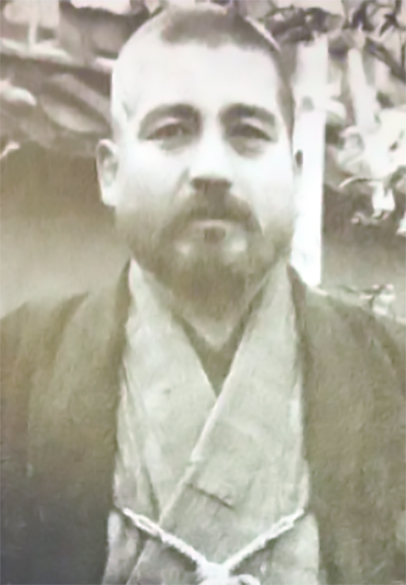

Naitō Takaharu (内藤高治) (1862–1929) was a Japanese martial artist.

A swordsman of the Hokushin Ittō-ryū, Naitō taught kendo to the Japanese Police force, and was also the first teacher at the Budo Senmon Gakko. He helped to create the Dai Nihon Teikoku Kendo Kata, a group that promulgated the practice of kendo in Japanese schools and universities under the auspices of the Dai Nippon Butoku Kai.

Naitō was a skilled exponent of the use of kiai in kendo, and it is recorded that he used this ability in a match with Takano Sazaburo. Despite not striking a single blow in the contest, and being hit repeatedly on the kote (wrist guard) and men (protective helmet), Naitō was judged to have displayed a superior level of swordsmanship, because he was able to receive Takano's attacks without any sign of concern.
