= Chiba Narimasa =

Japanese swordsman

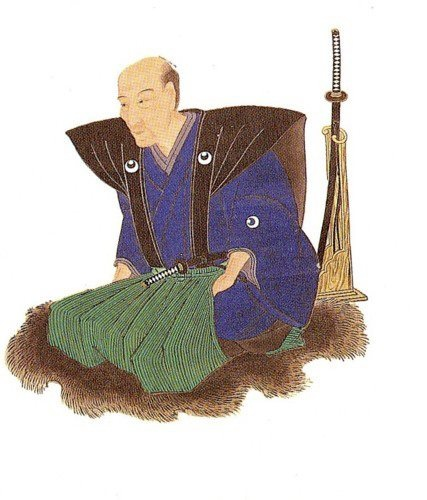
Chiba Shūsaku Narimasa

Chiba Shūsaku Taira no Narimasa (千葉 周作 成政; 1792, Kesen Village (now part of Kesennuma, Miyagi Prefecture), Japan – January 17, 1855) was the founder of the Hokushin Ittō-ryū Hyōhō (北辰一刀流兵法) and one of the last masters who was called a Kensei (sword saint).

== Early life ==
Chiba Shūsaku was the son of the swordsman Chūzaemon, who was originally from Miyagi Prefecture. He was born as the second son of his family in Kesen-Mura. His father Chūzaemon studied Kenjutsu under Chiba Kōemon Narikatsu (founder of the Hokushin Musō-ryū). There has been some confusion about Chiba Shūsaku's ancestry and birthplace. Shūsaku's father Chūzaemon had moved his family to Mito, Chiba prefecture, and demonstrated his swordsmanship skill at the end of the 18th century. Afterwards, Chūzaemon was adopted by Chiba Kōemon Narikatsu and given the new name Chiba Chūzaemon Naritane. Shūsaku originally studied the family martial art, the Hokushin Musō-ryū, of the Chiba clan, first from his father and later directly from his grandfather, Chiba Kōemon Narikatsu.

In 1809, Chiba Chūzaemon moved with his family to Matsudo, near Edo. In Matsudo Shūsaku studied the Ittō-ryū under Asari Yoshinobu Matashichiro and Nakanishi Chubei Tanemasa. Shūsaku married Asari Yoshinobu Matashichiro's daughter, changed his name to Asari Shusaku Narimasa, and took charge of the Asari dojo. After a falling out with his father-in-law, Shūsaku changed his name back to Chiba and began his Musha shugyō, visiting many Dōjō and dueled many famous swordsmen of ryūha like the Shinto Munen-ryū, Jikishinkage-ryū, Maniwa Nen-ryū, different Ittō-ryū lines and many other.

== Hokushin Ittō-ryū Hyōhō ==
After studying several styles of martial arts, Shūsaku created his own style in the 1820s, and called his school Hokushin Ittō-ryū Hyōhō (北辰一刀流兵法). The name is a combination from Hokushin Musō-ryū and the Ittō-ryū lines he studied.

In some ways the Hokushin Ittō-ryū Hyōhō is a simplification of the Ittō-ryū forms, but one that concentrates on the essentials. Shūsaku's teaching methods were seen as revolutionary and influenced other styles. In the Bakumatsu-period there was a saying, "If someone needs 6 years of training to master a ryuha, he will only need half the time in the Hokushin Ittō-ryū". The curriculum of the school contains mainly Kenjutsu, Battojutsu, Naginatajutsu and Jūjutsu.
