= Ittō Shōden Mutō-ryū =

Ittō Shōden Mutō-ryū (一刀正伝無刀流)

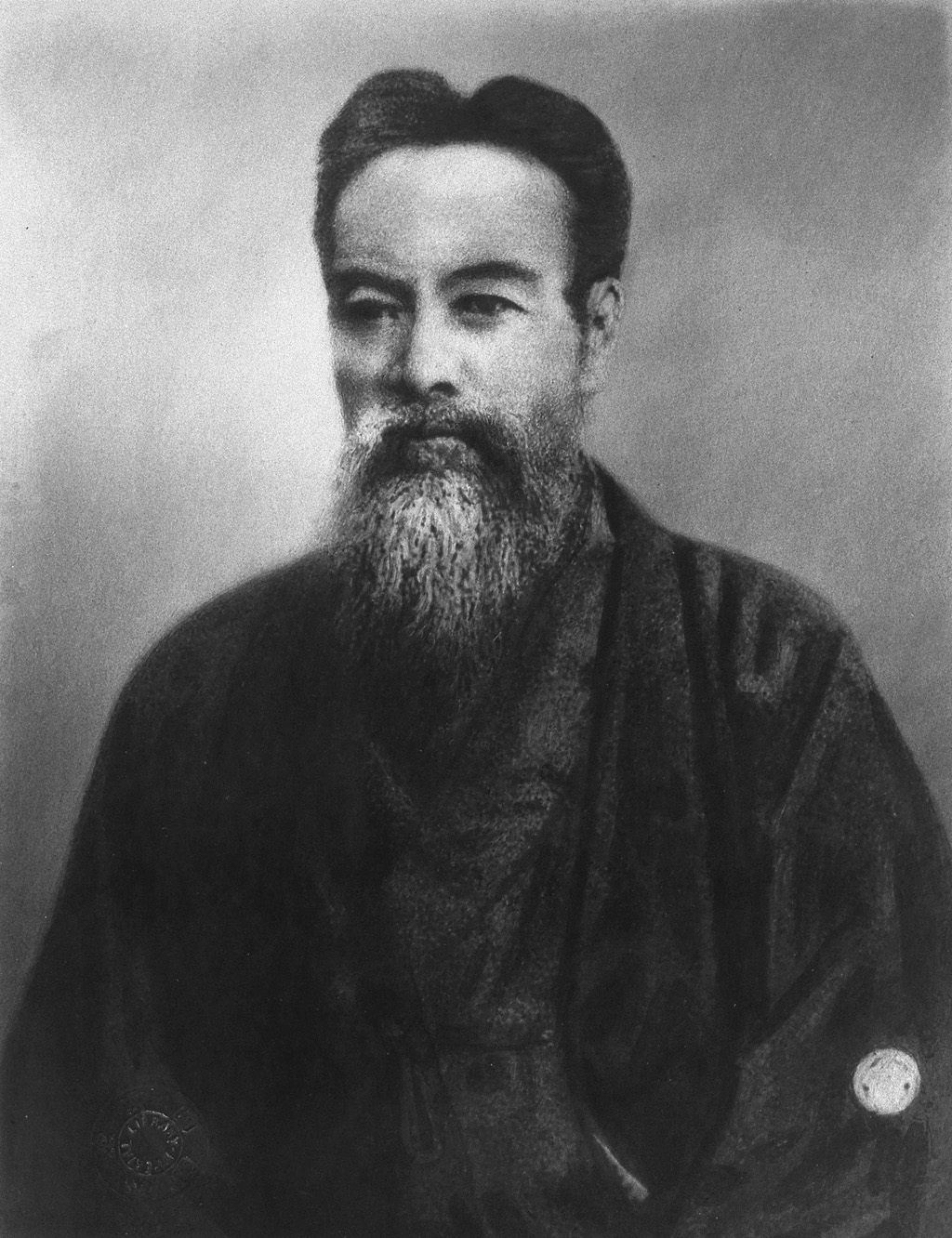
A mature portrait of Yamaoka Tetsutarō (Yamaoka Tesshū), the creator of the Ittō Shōden Mutō-ryū school of swordsmanship

is a school of Japanese swordsmanship (kenjutsu) created by Yamaoka Tetsutaro Takayuki, more commonly known as Yamaoka Tesshū.[1]

He studied a number of ryu over the years, most notably Jikishinkage Ryu, Hokushin Ittō-ryū and Nakanishi-ha Ittō-ryū. Tesshū received the full transmissions of both the Hokushin Ittō-ryū and the Nakanishi-ha Ittō-ryū from his teachers. In creating his own line of transmission, he named it the Itto Shoden Muto-ryu to emphasise that he was passing on the correct transmission of Ittō-ryū principles and techniques. The term muto (No-Sword) refers to Yamaoka's stated realisation that the difference between the sword and the self, and between oneself and one’s opponent is illusory and that the underlying unity of all is the most important thing in swordsmanship.

The school practice shugyō, (austere) training of swordsmanship, which put into test one's mental and physical capacity to the greatest levels. Today, there are very few exponents of Yamaoka’s school. Itto Shoden Muto-ryu is now practiced in Kanazawa, Ishikawa Prefecture. Murakami Yasumasa, who learned from a late Chief Justice of the Supreme Court, Ishida Kazuto, used to be the sixth generation head of the school.

== List of heads of the school ==
- Founder : Tesshū Yamaoka
- 2nd Head : Zenjirō Kagawa
- 3rd Head : Ryūzō Ishikawa
- 4th Head : Ryūnosuke Kusaka
- 5th Head : Kazuto Ishida
- 6th Head : Murakami Yasumasa
- 7th Head : Takehiro Izaki
