= Yamaoka Tesshū =

Samurai of the Bakumatsu period

- 山岡 鉄舟
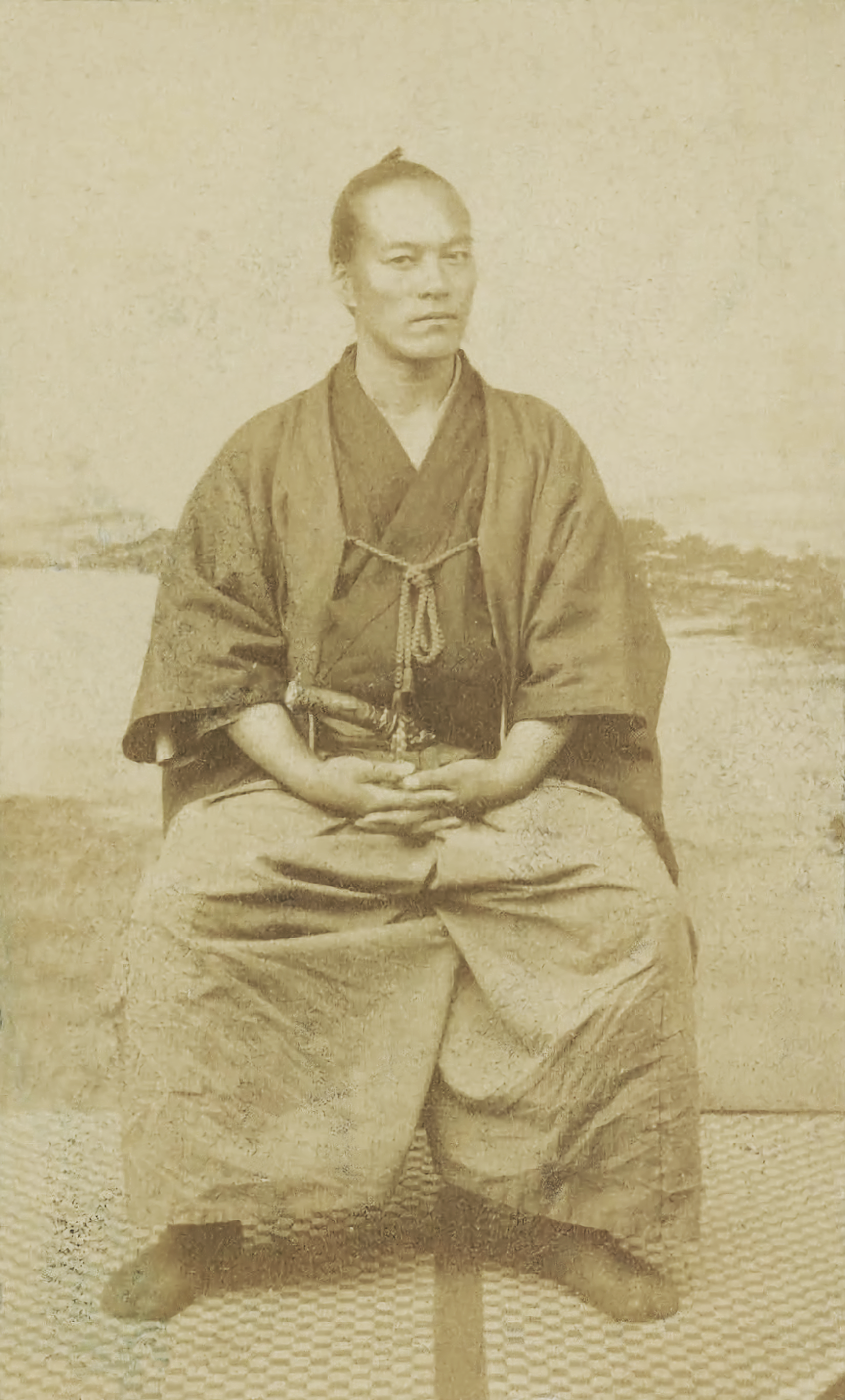
- Yamaoka Tesshū between 1860–1870

Governor of Imari Prefecture
- In office 22 December 1871 – 24 January 1872 Serving with Koga Sadao
- Monarch: Meiji
- Preceded by: Koga Sadao
- Succeeded by: Shigetsugu Taku

Governor of Ibaraki Prefecture
- In office 13 July 1871 – 9 December 1871
- Monarch: Meiji
- Preceded by: Office established
- Succeeded by: Yamaguchi Tadasada

Personal details
- Born: 10 June 1836 Edo, Musashi, Japan
- Died: 19 July 1888 (aged 52) Tokyo, Japan
- Other names: Yamaoka Tetsutarō; Ono Tetsutarō

Yamaoka Tesshū (山岡 鉄舟; 10 June 1836 – 19 July 1888), also known as Ono Tetsutarō or Yamaoka Tetsutarō, was a famous samurai of the Bakumatsu period, who played an important role in the Meiji Restoration. He is also noted as the founder of the Itto Shoden Muto-ryu school of swordsmanship. Along with Katsu Kaishū and Takahashi Deishū they were called “The Three Boats of the Bakumatsu (幕末の三舟)”.

== Early life ==
Yamaoka was born in Edo (present-day Tokyo) as Ono Tetsutaro, where his father was a retainer of the Tokugawa shogunate and his mother was the daughter of a Shinto priest from Kashima Shrine. Yamaoka practiced swordsmanship from the age of nine, starting in the Jikishinkage-ryū tradition. After that he learned Hokushin Ittō-ryū from Inoue Hachirō, who was asked by Yamaoka Tesshū's father to teach his son. Later his family moved to Takayama where he began the Nakanishi-ha Ittō-ryū style of fencing. When he was seventeen, he returned to Edo and joined the government's Kobukan Military Institute and the Yamaoka School of Spear Fighting under Yamaoka Seizan. Not long after Yamaoka had joined the dojo, Seizan died, Yamaoka went on to marry Seizan's sister in order to carry on the Yamaoka name. From an early age, Yamaoka showed dedication and talent in the practice of martial arts. As he grew up, he became well known for several things: his swordsmanship, calligraphy, drinking and sleeping.

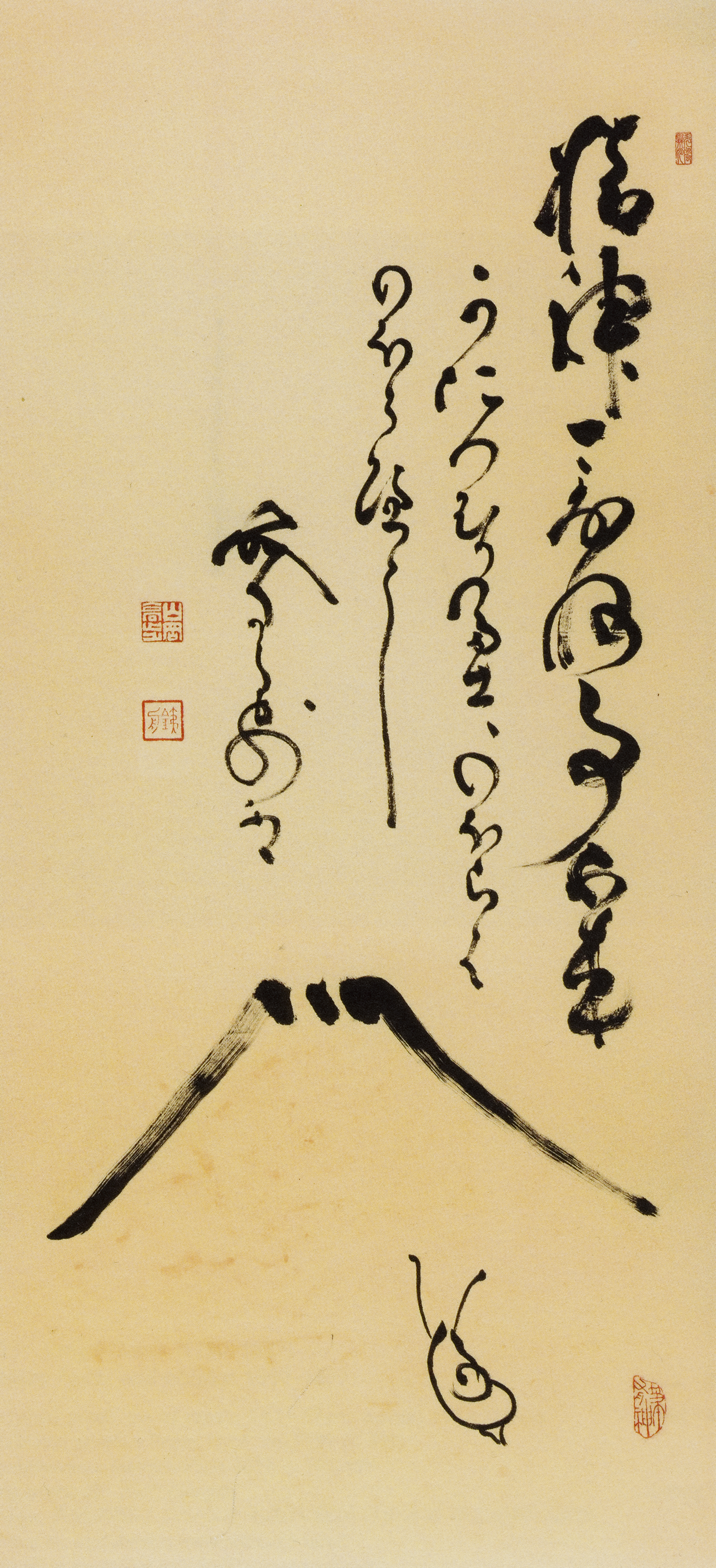
Calligraphy by Yamaoka Tesshū

== Career ==
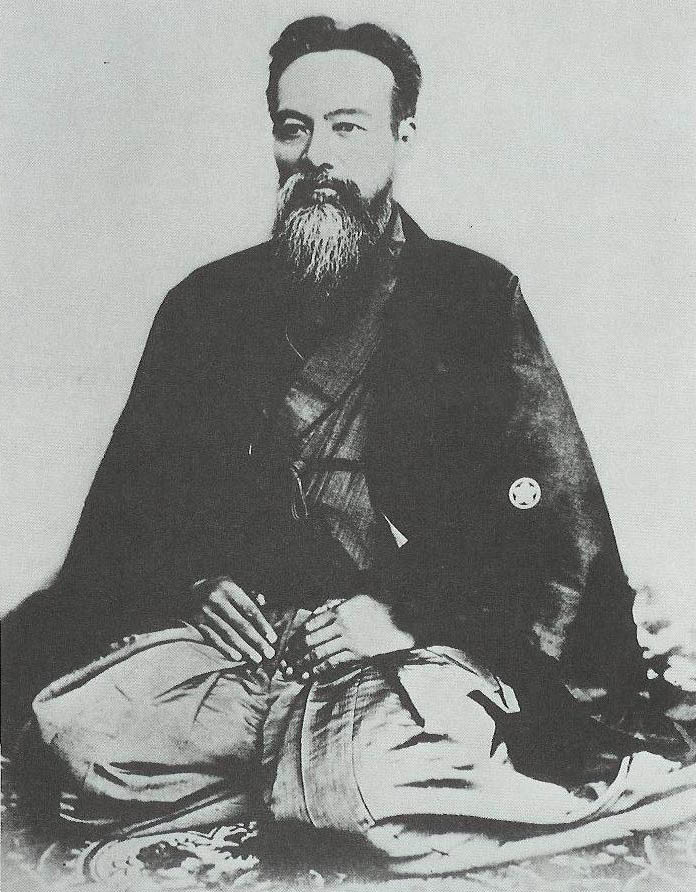
Yamaoka Tesshū at a mature age

In 1856, he became supervising instructor of swordsmanship at the Kobukan. In 1863, he became supervisor of the Roshigumi (a force of rōnin or "masterless samurai" serving as a mercenary auxiliary force to the Shogunal army). In 1868, he was appointed chief of the Seieitai, an elite bodyguard for the 15th Shōgun Tokugawa Yoshinobu. He went to Sunpu to negotiate with Saigō Takamori, and brought about Saigō's meeting with Katsu Kaishū, thereby contributing to the surrender of Edo Castle to imperial forces. After the Meiji Restoration, he became an official of the Shizuoka Domain, followed by a posting as governor of the short-lived Imari Prefecture. Later, he served in the court of Emperor Meiji as a chamberlain and close aide. Yamaoka died at the age of fifty-two on 19 July 1888, of stomach cancer. Before his death, he is said to have composed his death poem first, then sat formally and closed his eyes, slipping into death.

== Enlightenment ==
Yamaoka studied the art of swordsmanship thoroughly until the morning of 30 March 1880, at the age of 45, when he became enlightened while in meditation. From this point on, Yamaoka worked to maintain a dojo for his style of combat known as "no-sword" — the point in which a samurai realises that there is no enemy and that purity of the style is all that is needed. He is famous for his range of Zen art works.

== Appearance in Koan ==
Although he lived well after the "Golden Age of Zen", Yamaoka appears in a handful of modern kōan. Three popular koan featuring Yamaoka are listed below.

- Nothing Exists, featuring a young and precocious Yamaoka.
- Children of His Majesty, featuring Yamaoka as the Emperor's teacher.
- Storyteller's Zen, showing Yamaoka using skillful means.

== Awards ==
- Yamaoka posthumously was a recipient of the Order of the Rising Sun, 2nd class.

== See also ==
- Takahashi Deishū
- Shimizu Jirocho
- Sakakibara Kenkichi
