= Takahashi Deishū =

- 高橋 泥舟
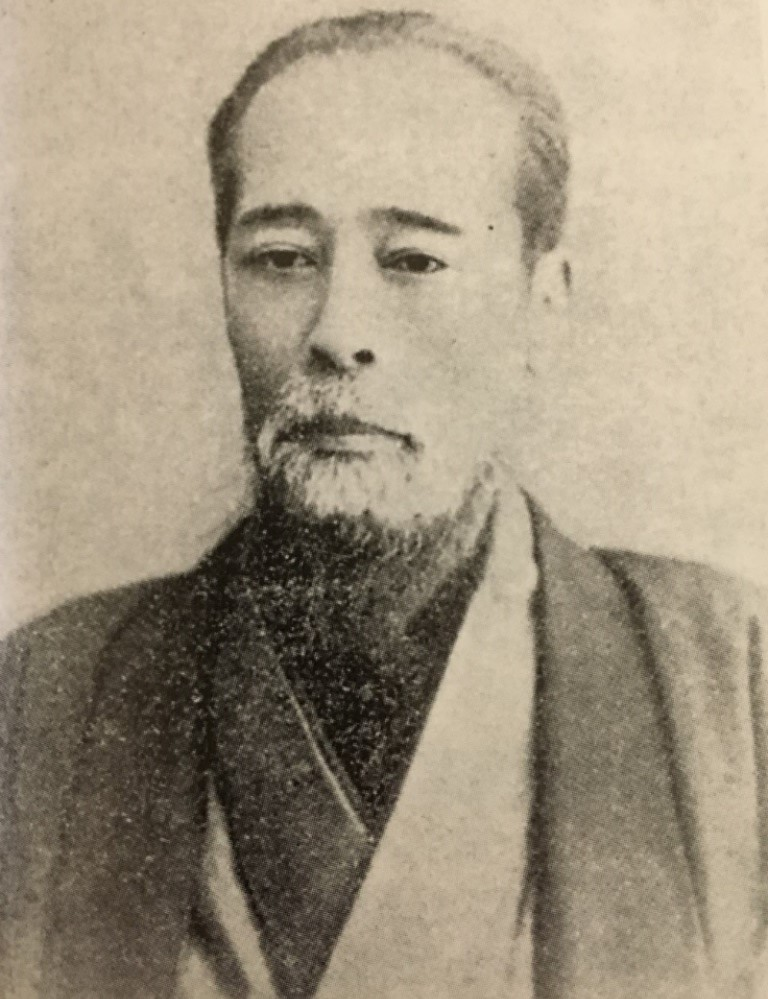

Personal details
- Born: Yamaoka Kenzaburō (山岡 謙三郎); March 15, 1835 Edo, Musashi Province, Japan
- Died: February 13, 1903 (aged 67) Ushigome, Tokyo, Japan

Military service
- Allegiance: Tokugawa Shogunate
- Years of service: 1868-1869
- Battles/wars: Boshin War

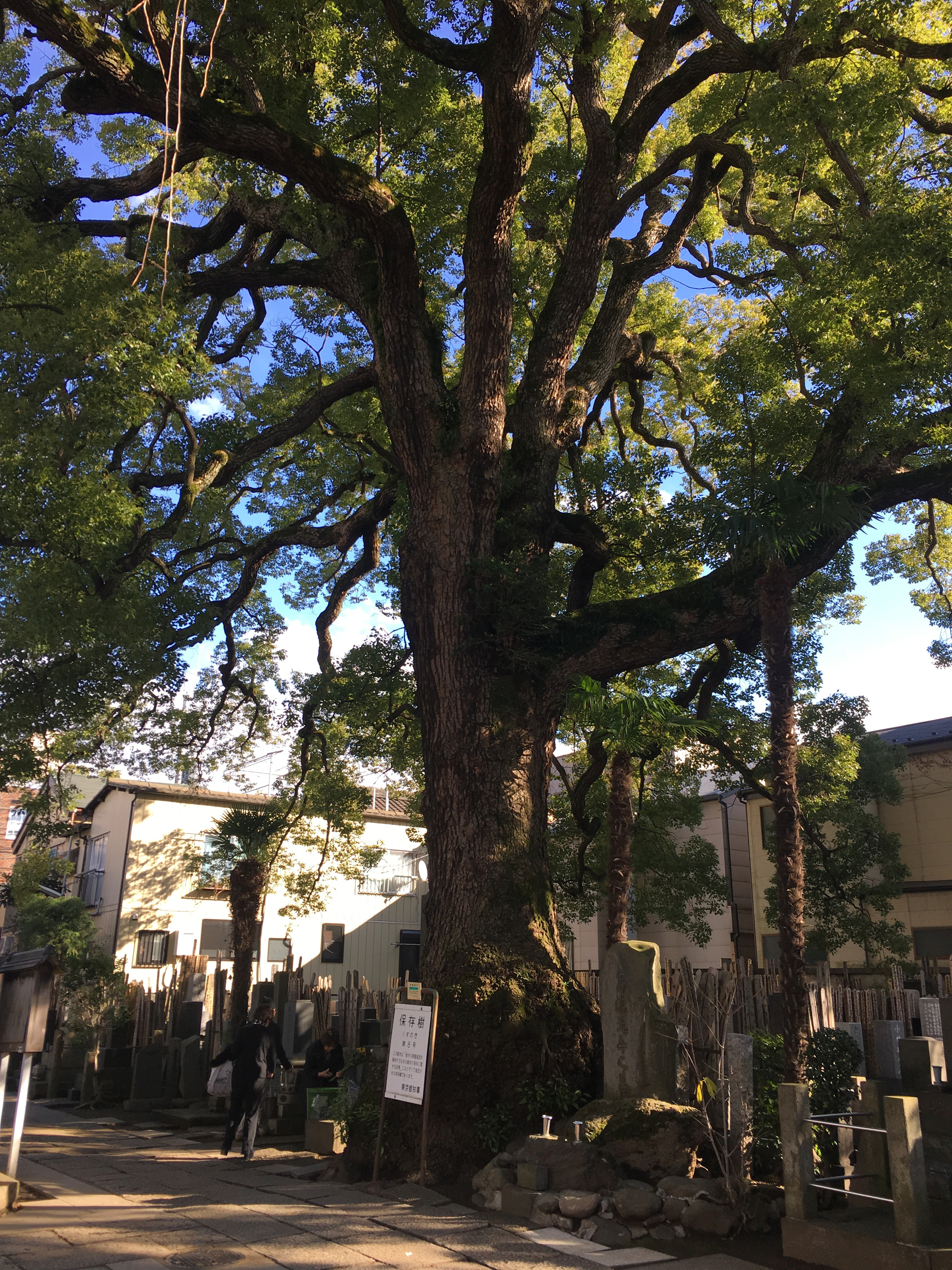
Takahashi Deishū's grave and the camphor tree

Takahashi Deishū (高橋 泥舟; March 15, 1835 – February 13, 1903) was a Japanese samurai, calligrapher, and author. His imina was Masaaki (政晃), and he is also known to have used the pseudonyms Seiichi (精一) and Ninzai (忍歳).

== Biography ==
Born in Edo, Japan, as the second son of the hatamoto Yamaoka Masanari (山岡 正業). He succeeded to his mother's side and was adopted by Takahashi Kanetsugu (高橋 包承).

The Yamaoka family, into which he was born, was well known for the Jitokuin school (自得院流, Jitokuin-ryū) of spearmanship, and he trained under his elder brother Yamaoka Seizan (山岡 静山; 1829-1855), who was regarded as a great master in the use of the spear. In 1855, Seizan died of illness at the age of 26, and Ono Tetsutarō, a student of his, married into the Yamaoka family. Taking the family name, Ono became Yamaoka Tesshū.

In 1856, Deishū became an instructor of spearmanship at the Kōbusho. Later, in 1862, he accompanied Hitotsubashi Yoshinobu to Edo.

In 1866, he was assigned to head the newly established Yūgekitai (遊撃隊) commando unit. At the outbreak of the Boshin War in 1868, Deishū fought in the Battle of Toba–Fushimi. After the defeat of the Shogunal forces there, he returned to Edo where he attempted to rally for loyalty to Yoshinobu. On March 5 of that year, Deishū was part of the guard regiment that accompanied Yoshinobu's retreat from Edo Castle to the Kan'ei-ji in Ueno. On May 3, in the aftermath of the Fall of Edo, he remained alongside Yoshinobu during the latter's move to the Mito Domain.

After the conclusion of the war, Yoshinobu chose Deishū as his emissary to Saigō Takamori for the negotiation of the disposal of the Tokugawa family due to his resolute character. However, Deishū recommended that his brother-in-law, Yamaoka Tesshū, conduct the negotiations instead.

Later, when the Tokugawa family moved from Edo to Shizuoka, he moved with them and temporarily took stewardship of Tanaka Castle, a Tokugawa property. After the abolition of the han system, he resigned his post and settled into a secluded retirement in Tokyo. He spent the remainder of his life appraising calligraphy, paintings, and antiques.

He died at his home in 1903.

== Bibliography ==
- 頭山 Tōyama, 満 Mitsuru (2007). 幕末三舟伝 Bakumatsu sanshū den (2nd ed.). Japan: 国書刊行会 Kokusho Kankōkai. ISBN 978-4336049841.
