= Ittō-ryū =

Japanese ancestor school of several Koryū kenjutsu styles

Ittō-ryū (一刀流), meaning "one-sword school", is the ancestor school of several Japanese Koryū kenjutsu styles, including Ono-ha, Mizoguchi-ha, Nakanishi-ha, Kogen, Hokushin, Itto Shoden and even Mugai Ryu. The style was developed by Itō Ittōsai Kagehisa.

== Ono-ha Ittō-ryū ==
Ono-ha Ittō-ryū (小野派一刀流) is the oldest of the many Ittō-ryū styles which descended from Ittōsai Kagehisa's original art. It continues to be one of the most influential of the traditional kenjutsu styles today, exerting a major influence, along with Hokushin branch, upon modern kendo's kata, tactics, and aesthetic.

Ono-ha was founded by Ittōsai's immediate successor, Mikogami Tenzen (also known as Ono Jiroemon Tadaaki, 1565–1628), from whence the name of the art is derived. Oral tradition indicates that Ittosai made Tadaaki fight a serious duel with another student, Zenki, in order to establish a successor to the style. Serving as an instructor to both the second and third shōguns, along with Yagyū Munenori of the rival school the Yagyū Shinkage-ryū, Tadaaki was able to continue to give his art wide exposure. It was said that Tadaaki was Munenori's superior in swordsmanship, but that his severe character led him to be the less favoured and respected of the two.

Known as a dueling style which focused upon the sword rather than a more multifaceted, multi-weapon, battlefield style, Ono developed a mock split-bamboo sword called a fukuro-shinai in order to reduce training injuries and allow more committed fighting practice.

From a technical standpoint this style consists of more than 150 techniques for both long and short swords. Kiri-otoshi, which translates simply as "cutting down", is still the defining technique, like that of its parent style. Characteristically, practitioners often feel that they have the ability to strike freely due to their technique of cutting down the center line during an opponent's cut in order to displace their attacker's sword and gain victory. The style adheres to a philosophy articulated in the phrase "itto sunawachi banto (一刀即万刀)" or "one sword gives rise to ten thousand swords," meaning that a thorough understanding of the fundamental technique of cutting will lead one to understand the myriad variations.

Although formally established as a system for unarmoured fighting, the techniques maintained an awareness of the demands and tactics of armoured fighting, making the techniques adaptable to such circumstances.

The transmission of the system passed out of the Ono family briefly and was maintained by the feudal lord Tsugaru Nobumasa. The second headmaster from this family taught Ono Tadakata, allowing the Ono family to continue preserving the line while the Tsugaru family continued their practice of the art, thereby having two families maintain the main line of the Ono-ha Ittō-ryū tradition thereafter. The Tsugaru family also taught the system to members of Yamaga family, and they worked together to preserve the line of their art.

Sasamori Junzo, a well known and high ranking kendo practitioner, succeeded the system as the 16th headmaster during the Taishō period, followed by his son, Sasamori Takemi as the 17th headmaster, and Yabuki Yuji as the 18th and current headmaster. Reigakudō (礼楽堂) is the name of his headquarters school, which was founded by Sasamori Junzo in Setagaya, Tokyo, Japan.

== Mizoguchi-ha Ittō-ryū ==
Mizoguchi-ha Ittō-ryū (溝口派一刀流) was founded by Mizoguchi Shingoemon Masakatsu, who was a student of the second headmaster of Ono-ha Ittō-ryū, Ono Jiroemon Tadatsune, before creating his own style, the Mizoguchi-ha.

Ito Masamori, a student of Mizoguchi's, visited the Aizu clan and taught Edamatsu Kimitada an incomplete version of the art. Ikegami Jozaemon Yasumichi, a student of Edamatsu, was sent by the daimyō (feudal lord) to study the sword methods to be found in Edo (present-day Tokyo). Combining methods learned there with the original teachings of Mizoguchi-ha Ittō-ryū, he created a distinct Aizu line of the Mizoguchi-ha school with many significant differences in technique. This is the line that survives today, as the original line has disappeared.

Watching a demonstration of the Mizoguchi-ha Ittō-ryū it easily distinguishable from its parent art, the Ono-ha Ittō-ryū, and the Nakanishi-ha and Itto Shoden Muto-ryū. The kata used in these styles bear a close resemblance to each other. The Mizoguchi-ha at times looks like an entirely different art rather than just a different branch of the Ittō school, although employing some similar tactics. Many of the kata seem more overtly instructive in their orientation, teaching tactics to the left and then to the right.

The curriculum consists of five long-sword and three short-sword techniques with omote (outside/surface) and ura (inner/more sophisticated) versions. Being a traditional school of the Aizu clan, which was based in Fukushima, it is currently maintained by the Fukushima prefecture and local kendo federations. There is also a group of practitioners in Kōbukan kendo club (Nakano, Tokyo) led by Hiroshi Ozawa sensei that regularly demonstrates Mizoguchi-ha Ittō-ryū at annual Kyoto Enbu Taikai.

Although Takeda Sōkaku, the founder of Daitō-ryū, claimed to maintain the traditional teachings of the Aizu clan, according to his son, Tokimune, the core of his approach to the sword, although modified, was based upon the Ono-ha Ittō-ryū rather than Mizoguchi-ha.

== Nakanishi-ha Ittō-ryū ==
Nakanishi-ha Ittō-ryū (中西派一刀流) was founded by Nakanishi Chuta Tanesada who studied under either the 5th or 6th generation headmaster of Ono-ha Ittō-ryū, before establishing his own style. His son revolutionized practice by implementing the use of shinai, a bamboo mock sword, in conjunction with bōgu, a protective armor. (Shinai were already used in Shinkage-ryū, Nen-ryū, and Tatsumi-ryū by this time.) Using the equipment to allow swordsmen to practice techniques freely and engage in sporting matches, foreshadowing the rise of modern kendo, led to the rapid popularity of the Nakanishi branch of Ittō-ryū.

Stylistically the Nakanishi branch is said to more closely resemble its source, the Ono-ha Ittō-ryū, than do any other branches of the Ittō-ryū. The kata practiced on the surface appear to be identical in form but differ in such aspects as timing, breathing, and use of distance.

The Nakashima branch is marked by its wide stances and deliberate movements, which confer a feeling of power and dignity. This style, like the Ono-ha Ittō-ryū, employs the use of the heavily padded glove known as the "onigote," to allow forceful finishing strikes practiced as the denouement of each kata.

Many famous swordsmen have emerged from this ryū, some founding schools of their own. Some of the more prominent among them were:

- Terada Gouemon (Founder of the Tenshin Ittō-ryū)
- Shirai Toru (Successor to Terada)
- Takayanagi Yoshimasa (Founder of the Takayanagi-ha Toda-ryū)
- Asari Yoshinobu (Teacher to Yamaoka Tesshu)
- Chiba Shūsaku (Founder of Hokushin Ittō-ryū)
- Takano Sazaburo (A key developer of modern swordsmanship).

Takano, as a well known educator, was able to introduce swordsmanship into the public school system in Japan and was instrumental to the development of the Nihon Kendo Kata.

== Kogen Ittō-ryū ==
Kogen Ittō-ryū (甲源一刀流) was founded by Henmi Tashiro Yoshitoshi, a student of Sakurai Gosuke Nagamase, who in turn was an exponent of the Aizu branch of Mizoguchi-ha Ittō-ryū. The Henmi dojo still stands in Saitama Prefecture.

This is Ryūnosuke Tsukue's sword school in the 1966 historical drama The Sword of Doom (大菩薩峠). Tatsuya Nakadai played the part of Ryūnosuke in this film.

== Hokushin Ittō-ryū ==
Hokushin Ittō-ryū (北辰一刀流) was founded in the late Edo period (1820s) by Chiba Shūsaku Narimasa (1794–1856). He was one of the last masters who was called a Kensei (sword saint).

== Ittō Shōden Mutō-ryū ==
Ittō Shōden Mutō-ryū (一刀正伝無刀流) was founded by Yamaoka Tetsutaro Takayuki, better known as Yamaoka Tesshū, an exponent of Ono-ha Ittō-ryū, Nakanishi-ha Ittō-ryū and Hokushin Ittō-ryū, in which he received a license of full transmission.

== Tadanari-ha Ittō-ryū ==
Tadanari-ha (Chuya-ha) Ittō-ryū (忠也派一刀流) was founded by Itō Tenzen Tadanari.

== Tenshin Ittō-ryū ==
Tenshin Ittō-ryū (天辰一刀流) was founded by Suzuki Naonoshin Akemitsu. He learned Yagyu-Shingan-ryu (柳生心眼流), Ono-ha Ittō-ryū (小野派一刀流) in Sendai-Han, and learned Hokushin Ittō-ryū (北辰一刀流) in Edo (1840). In 1857, he was appointed the kenjutsu teacher of the Sendai-han. Then, he founded Tenshin Ittō-ryū (天辰一刀流) from the 3 schools. The school still stands in Sendai, Miyagi.
