= Shimizu Jirocho =

Japanese yakuza (1820–1893)

Shimizu Jirochō
- 清水 次郎長
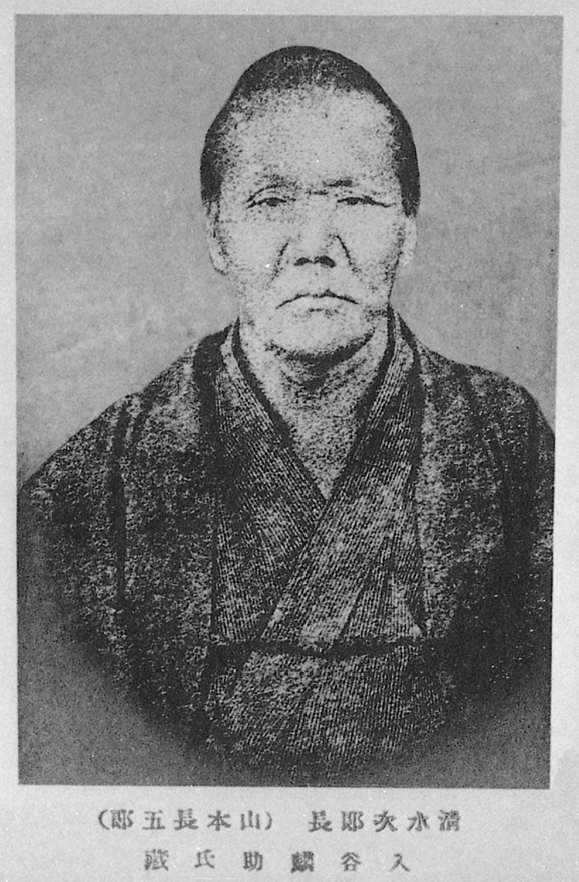
- Shimizu Jirochō (before 1893)
- Born: Chōgorō Yamamoto (山本 長五郎); 14 February 1820; Suruga Province, Tokaido, Nihon (Japan)
- Died: 12 June 1893 (aged 73); Shizuoka, Japan
- Resting place: Baiin-Zen-Ji Temple, Shizuoka
- Other names: Chogoro, Old Man of the Harbor
- Occupations: Yakuza, bakuto, entrepreneur, philanthropist
- Known for: Yakuza boss (oyabun) of Tokaido, philanthropy
- Spouse: Ocho
- Children: 1 (Guan Amada aka Goro Yamamoto)
- Relatives: Takagi Miuemon (father), Jirohachi Yamamoto (adoptive father)
- Allegiance: Yakuza syndicate in Shimizu Minato and Tōkaidō region
- Criminal charges: Gambling
- Penalty: 7 years' imprisonment (1884)

Shimizu Jirochō (Japanese: 清水次郎長; 14 February 1820 – 12 June 1893) was a famous yakuza and entrepreneur. He is considered a folk hero in Japan. Born Chōgorō Yamamoto (山本潮五郎), he was adopted by his uncle Jirohachi Yamamoto who was a rice wholesaler. Due to the fall of his adoptive family he became a bakuto (gambler) and thereafter the biggest yakuza boss of the Tōkaidō region. Jirochō was also a philanthropist, business leader, and a patriot. In the late 19th century, Jirochō dominated the port of Shimizu and two main routes; Tōkaidō and Nakasendō, which connected the two former capitals, Kyoto and Edo. He had henchmen such as Omasa (大政), Komasa (小政), and Mori no Ishimatsu (森の石松). His life is distinguished as a violent crime boss, but also by humane, political, and economic development in his later years. There are multiple accounts about his life which makes it difficult to distinguish fact from legend. His legendary status is depicted in many movies and TV dramas.

== Early life ==
Jirochō's birth name was Chōgorō Yamamoto (山本 長五郎). He was born on February 14, 1820, south of the Tōkaidō post office in Ejiri-juku in Suruga Province, Udogun county (有渡郡) (now Shizuoka (city), Shimizu-ku, Shizuoka). He was the second son of boat owner and ferry captain Takagi Miuemon (高木 三右衛門), who worked along the Tomoe River. There are no records of his mother. There is a Japanese superstition that newborn babies on the first day of the lunar year will either become great geniuses or hopeless villains. His parents didn't want to take risks and gave him up for adoption.

His maternal uncle Jirohachi Yamamoto had no biological children and adopted Chōgorō. Jirohachi was a komedon-ya (ja:米問屋) (rice wholesaler, middleman-merchant dealing in rice) and the owner of a shop. Since there was a child named "Cho" (official name is unknown) among his childhood friends, the nearby people called him Jirochō. The name Jirochō is an abbreviation of "Jirohachi's Chōgorō". Years later he was still called Jirochō. Jirochō was a naughty child who frequently broke the rules. At the age of 15, he asked his adoptive father Jirohachi for permission to go to Edo (now Tokyo), but was refused, and then he stole money from his father and fled. According to rumors, the real reason for Jirochō's escape to Edo was because he had killed a man who asked him to give back money he had borrowed, and then threw the body into a river.

The Port of Shimizu (清水港) had ship transportation of rice for annual tribute (nengu, 年貢) from the Shinano and Kai provinces to Edo on ships through the Fuji River. There were privileged cargo vessel suppliers who collected commissions. Jirochō's Minowa-cho was a newly opened area in Shimizu Minato (Port of Shimizu). His biological father, Miuemon, had a shipping company that transported goods by himself. In addition, since his adoptive father Jirohachi was a merchant who held a stock of rice brokerage, it is believed that Miuemon transported rice grains through Jirohachi.

After the death of his adoptive father Jirohachi in 1835, Jirochō returned and became the owner of the komedon-ya. He worked at the shop until he was 23 years old. However, he quickly returned to gambling. In March 1842, an intoxicated Jirochō was accosted by thieves at night while returning home from gambling. He vowed to never be an easy target to thugs again. In June 1842, he fought with a gambler and murdered him. This was the start of his yakuza career. Jirochō managed the family business with his wife, all while repeatedly gambling and fighting. This included revenge, murder, and living the life of a gangster. He built up his following, extended his influence, and fought over territories relating to the Fuji River and maritime transport. He was able to consolidate power over maritime transport from Shimizu Port to the Fuji River. He divorced his first wife after she gave birth to a child. Jirochō left with his apprentice Okuma Ejiri and became a drifter. He went to Mikawa Province (now Aichi Prefecture), studied kendo, and learned about business from his godfather Terazu no Manozuke. Jirochō traveled to various countries, practiced, expanded, grew, and established a yakuza syndicate in Minato Shimizu. The history of Jirochō in this era is detailed in "Tokai Yukyoden" (東海遊侠伝) by Guan Amada (天田愚庵). Amada was adopted by Jirochō in 1881.

== Conflict between Jirocho and Bakuto ==
By the mid 19th century, yakuza gangs widely proliferated in Japan. They set up their gambling houses and robbed day laborers. Jirocho was the oyabun (leader) of a gang of six hundred men. His gang ruthlessly slaughtered a group of rivals in a neighboring prefecture. According to Jirocho, there was also a huge theft of large "golden dolphins" (kinshachi) from the roof of Nagoya Castle. Jirocho's followers tried to follow his wishes of not bothering local communities. However, conflicts with gamblers and thugs did affect ordinary people.

In 1845, Jirocho arbitrated and settled a dispute between two gang leaders Tsumugi Bunkichi (津向文吉) of Ichikawamisato in Kai Province, and Tazaemon Wadajima (和田島太右衛門), the uncle of Jirocho. This earned him more respect in the underworld. He gained many underlings such as Omasa (大政) (a former sumo wrestler from Nagoya), Komasa (小政) (from Hamamatsu), and Tsunekichi (from Gunma). For the next 20 years, he lived hidden from the law because he was wanted by the police. Meanwhile, he fought rival gangs and expanded his syndicate.

In the 1847, he met Okuma Ejiri's younger sister, Ochô (the eldest daughter of a Nishio-han retainer). Jirocho's relationship with Ocho (お蝶) became his third and final marriage.

On December 29, 1858, he was chased by an official when he entered and exited Koshu. He was betrayed by Hisakuro Hoshita in Nagoya, Owari Province, where he fled, and lost his wife's bow. In 1859, he killed Kyuroku in Owari Chita Kamezaki Otogawa. On September 16 of the same year, Kinpira Shimoda, Yoshibei, and others arrived in Shimizu Port from Numazu and attacked Jirocho.

On January 15, 1861, Yoshibei Miyakoda, the enemy of Ishimatsu, was killed in Ejiri Oiwake, Suruga Province. In October of the same year, he made a handicraft with Kinpira Shimoda in Kikugawa. On May 10, 1863, he faced Katsuzo Kurokoma of Kai Province in the Tenryu River.

On June 5, 1864, he attacked Katsuzo, who was hidden by Kamekichi Hirai in Mikawa Province, along with Axhachi Katahara. By 1866, Jirocho's syndicate consisted of over 500 henchmen. This would become a private army with approximately 2000 members.

== Since the Meiji Restoration ==
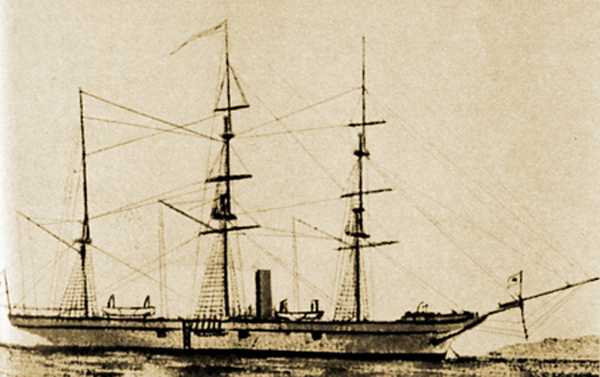
Warship Kanrin Maru

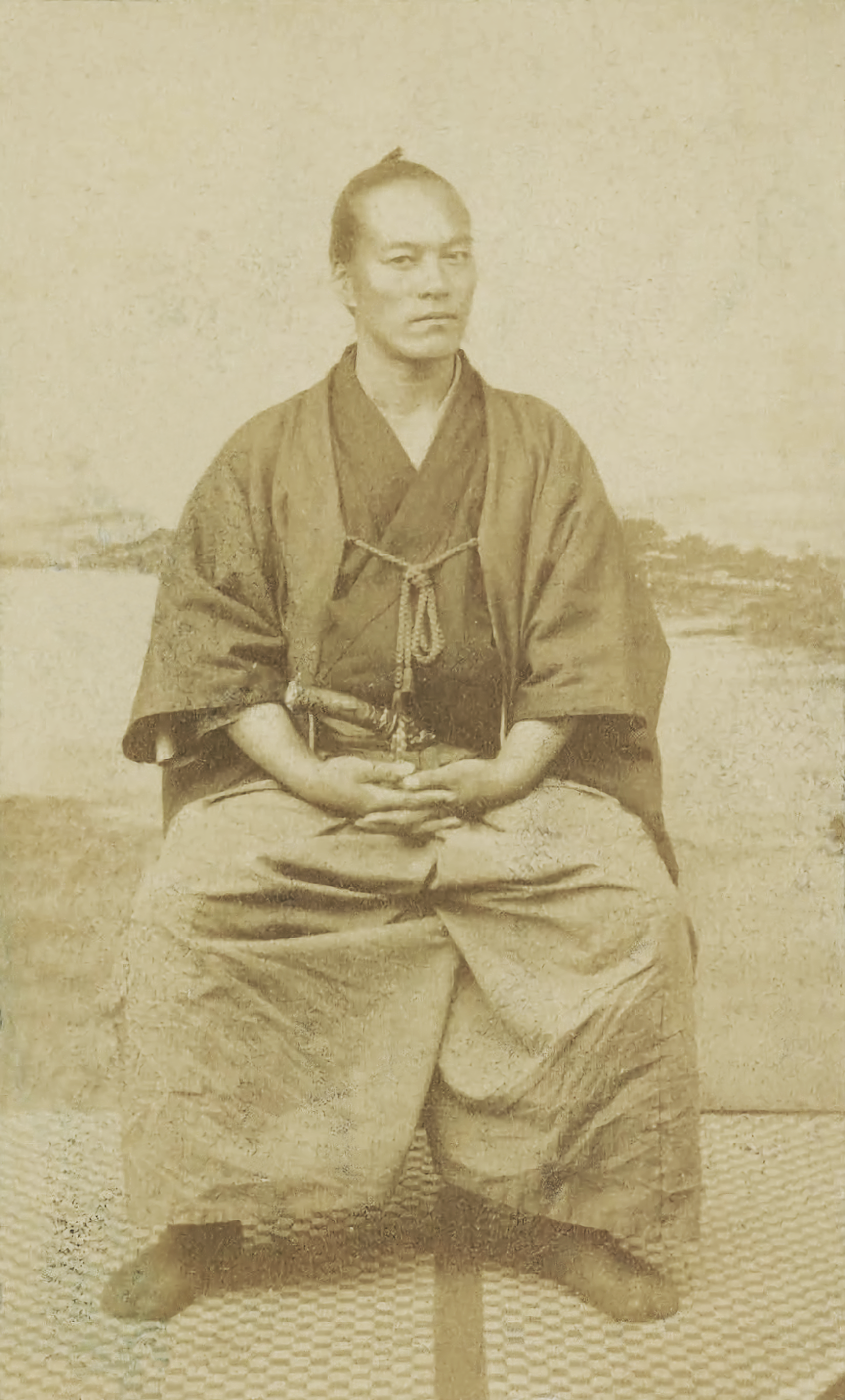
Yamaoka Tesshū

During the Bakumatsu period (1853 - 1867), Jirocho was an escort guard for the last Shogun Tokugawa Yoshinobu. Yoshinobu thanked him with a noshime (熨斗目, short sleeved kimono) garment as a gift. The abolishment of the shogunate caused confusion across Japan. Jirocho wielded great power, but was a gangster. Jirocho supported the revolutionary forces, so all his past crimes and murders were forgiven.

In the Meiji period (1868 - 1912), Jirocho reached a major turning point in his life. he played an important role in the Boshin War, after which the Tokugawa shogunate and the Edo period ended. Both the revolutionary army, who sought to return political power to the Imperial Court, and the army of the Tokugawa Shogunate tried to get help from the yakuza, since they had a well-organized military force.

On March 9, 1868, former samurai Yamaoka Tesshū met with Saigō Takamori in Sunpu and appealed for the life of Tokugawa Yoshinobu and the survival of the Tokugawa family name, but Tesshū was Jiro in the Hakurinmaru case. It is said that Jirocho was associated with Tesshū and Enomoto after the Meiji era because he was deeply impressed by the heroism of Yoshinobu.

In 1868, Jirocho was appointed Dochutansakugata by the Government-General of the Eastern Expedition. He was ordered to provide security to Shimizu Port and the Tokaido Line. Jirocho transformed from outlaw to public security. He served this role until July. From May to June of that year, he confronted Katsuzo Kurokoma, who joined the Sekihotai, in Sunpu. On October 14, 1871, Katsuzo Kurokoma was executed on charges of withdrawal from the Sekihotai and the Shogunate era.

In 1868, the warship Kanrin Maru of the old Edo Shogunate sailed with more than 3,000 Tokugawa army soldiers from Tokyo to Shimizu. On September 18, 1868, a fleet escaped from off Shinagawa under the leadership of Enomoto Takeaki, the former Deputy Governor of the Navy of the Shogunate. The warship Kanrin Maru broke off the coast of Boshu due to a storm and anchored at Shimizu Minato for repairs. They hoisted a white flag. However, while anchored at Shimizu harbor, the ship was attacked by pro-Imperial government troops. All members of the Shogunate army that remained aboard the ship were killed in the battle, known as the Kanrin Maru Incident, by the combined forces of Jirocho and the revolutionary army.

After the battle, the bodies of the crew members who had died drifted in Suruga Bay and were left to rot, because no one tried to dispose them due to fear of being blamed by the new Meiji government. Jirocho disagreed with this and decided that the large number of corpses should not be left on the coast. He took a boat to collect the bodies and ensured that they had a proper funeral. They were cremated with Buddhist services and buried with sincere condolences on the sandy beach of Mukojima. The new government army blamed the containment work, but Jirocho said, "If you die, everyone will be a Buddha. There is no government army or thief army in Buddha." These historical events are the basis of the humanity of Jirocho's legend.

Since the start of the Meiji period, Jirocho worked for the government. Yamaoka Tesshū was appointed governor of Emperor Meiji's court in 1871. Tesshū often resorted to the services of Jirocho when it was necessary to pacify the capital's poor, who were rising up against a half-starved existence, or peasants who were outraged by unfair extortions.

Despite his legitimate position, he was still involved in clandestine affairs. By 1869, Jirocho was more careful, calculating, and able to assess people's personalities. He had many powerful friends, such as Viscount Enomoto Takeaki (first governor of Shizuoka Prefecture) and Field Marshal Ōyama Iwao of the Imperial Japanese Army. He became shrewd enough to settle disputes without casualties. On May 22, 1869 (Meiji 2), Jirocho's second wife was murdered by a rival yakuza gang member. Jirocho negotiated with the gang's leader to prevent a gang war.

To establish a respectable reputation, Jirocho became involved in many philanthropic projects to develop communities and help charities. This included the reconstruction of Tesshuji Temple in Shizuoka, supporting local fire victims and displaced samurai from Tokyo, and arranging a first-class physician in Shimizu City.

It is believed that from Jirocho came the philosophical and cannibalistic maxim to the present yakuza:

"The pistol is cold. The pistol is a mechanism. There is no personification in it, - this is how the gangsters convey the words of Jirocho. - And the sword is an extension of the human hand, human flesh, and I can," the yakuza quote the saying of their progenitor, "convey the entire depth of hatred towards the enemy when the blade of my sword pierces his body, plunging the hand-sword into the body of the enemy - at this point in the retelling of the words of the yakuza, they usually roll their eyes in ecstasy - then there is no greater pleasure to say: "Shinde moraimasu", that is, "I ask you to die."

— Shimizu Jirocho

In February 1871, Jirocho planned to clear the forest, which was the territory of the former Kunozan Toshogu Shrine, but he gave up due to the resistance of Otani Village.

== Senior years ==
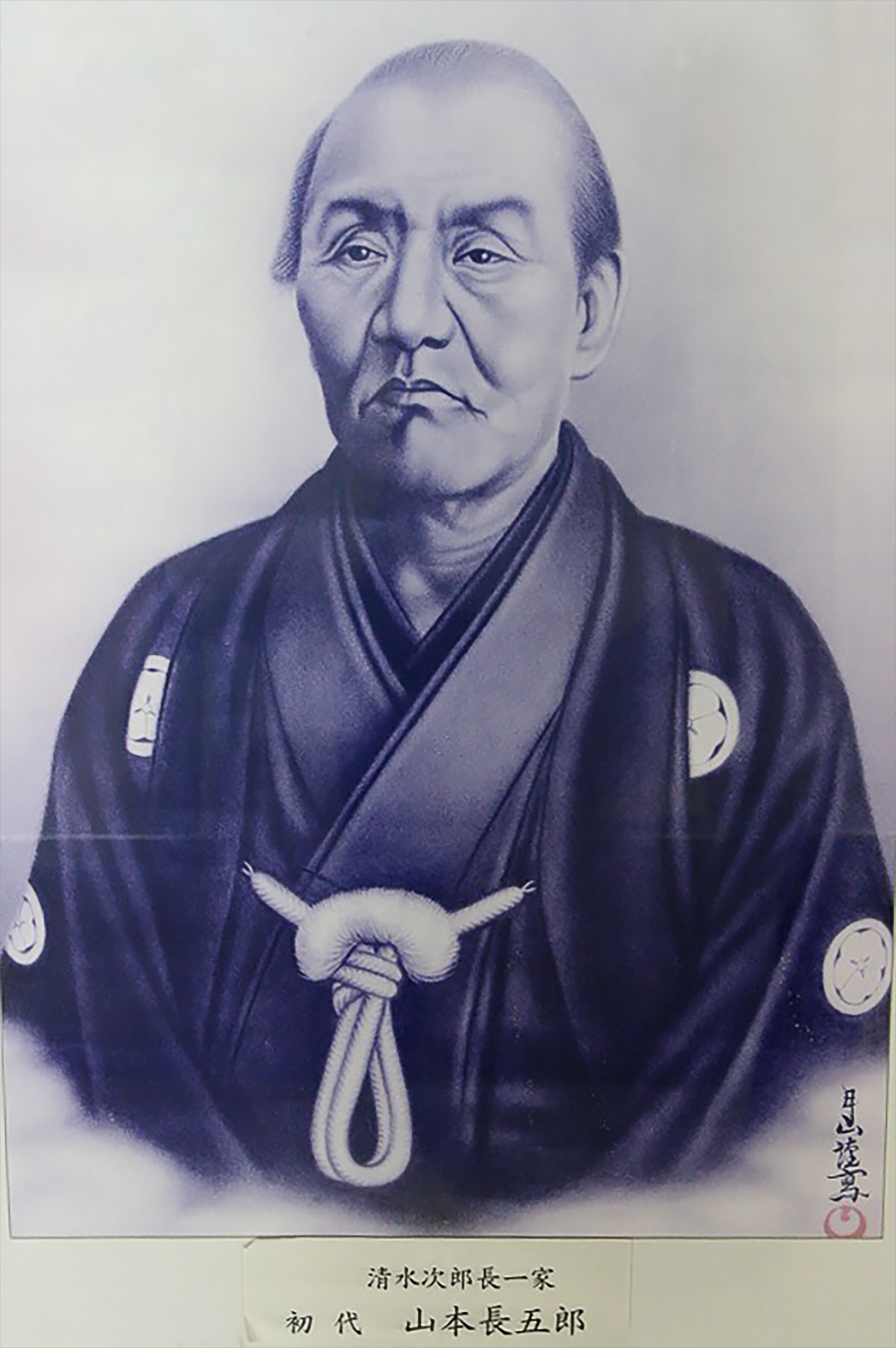
Shimizu Jirocho (Chogoro-Yamamoto)

In the senior years of his life, Jirocho stopped gambling. He got involved in numerous businesses, such as the modernization of Shimizu Port. During the Meiji period, Shimizu Port was one of the primary ports for the export of tea and other goods. He noted that it is important to expand the tea sales channel for the development of Shimizu Port. He appealed that the outer port of Shimizu should be improved with wharfs and other port facilities so that large steamships could enter and dock at the port. Jirocho opened a notable funayado (sailors' inn) called Suehiro in Shimizu Port near the former castle town of Sunpu. He was the innkeeper and his wife Ocho helped manage it in 1886. Today, there are still remnant stones of the "Jirocho wharfs" near the Suehiro inn. He also established a regular route with steamships from Shimizu Port to Yokohama.

From 1874 to 1884, Jirôchô contributed to a land reclamation project which cleared land near the base of Mt. Fuji (now Obuchi in Fuji City, Shizuoka Prefecture). Prisoners made the rocky soil suitable for agriculture. Jirocho backed the construction of multiple shinto shrines. Jorochi also engaged in marine transportation business. Furthermore, he contributed to the implementation of the cultivation of tea, cedars, cypresses, and wheat. Now, this area is known as "Jirôchô-machi" (Jirôchô Town). He also backed salt field projects at Miho and oil deposits at Sagara and Omaezaki. Additionally, Jirocho sponsored and helped establish one of the first English-language private schools in the region. It was within the Meitokukan school which was founded by former shogunal retainer Arai Kan at the nearby Jôjûin temple. He organized a special sumo event in Shizuoka. During his final years, Jirocho was affectionally called the "Old Man of the Harbor"

In 1878 (Meiji 11), Yamaoka Tesshu asked Jirocho to adopt Guan Amada (天田愚庵), because his father was killed during the Boshin War. Thereafter Amada was renamed Goro Yamamoto (山本五郎). On June 15, 1880, he helped the Mikawa Hirai family with Tsunekichi Harada and Ryukichi Unfu. Ryukichi Unfu was a bakuto and allied with Katsuzo Kuroma who was hostile to Jirocho. On June 15, 1880, he collaborated with the Mikawa Hirai family's Tsuneyoshi Harada (原田常吉) and Ryukichi Unfu (雲風竜吉). This handiwork resulted in a reconciliation between Katsuzo and Jirocho. By the end of the 19th century, Jirocho created a large yakuza clan and subjugated all the gambling dens along the main Routes from Edo to Kyoto.

In addition, when the former officers of the Suruga Red Heart Corps and the Enshu Bulletin Corps, who were following the Arisugawa-no-miya, returned to their hometowns, an incident occurred in which the former shogunate who had been relocated to Suruga repeated terrorist acts with resentment. Jirocho protected the weak in order to prevent blood from bleeding locally.

On February 25, 1884, Jirocho was arrested during a crackdown by the Shizuoka Prefectural Police Headquarters under the "Gambling Criminal Disposition Regulations". On April 7, 1884, he was sentenced to 7 years of punishment and a fine of 400 yen, and was locked in Imiya Prison (Imiya-cho, Aoi-ku, Shizuoka City). Due to Jirocho's powerful connections including the efforts of Shizuoka Prefectural Ordinance and the politician Takayoshi Sekiguchi (1836–1889), he was released on parole after 23 months in 1885 without waiting for the expiration of his sentence.

Jirocho's son Goro Yamamoto (Guan Amada) wrote a lot about the life of Jirocho which helped him to gain legendary status. In April 1884, Goro published "Tokai Yuuden". After 10 years (1888), Goro left Jirocho and became an imperial retainer and then a Buddhist monk.

Shigetoshi Ueki, who graduated from the University of Tokyo's School of Medicine in 1886, met on board a ship heading from Yokohama to Tosa, and invited Ryozo Watanabe, who came from Kajimachi, Tosa, the same town as Ueki, to Shimizu. Yamaoka Tesshu died on July 19, 1888, and the Shimizu family attended the funeral held at Yanaka Zenshoan. On August 4, the same year, a part of the reclaimed land at the southern base of Mt. Fuji was sold to Kaemon Takashima.

On June 12, 1893, he died of a cold at the age of 73 at his inn, Suehiro. Between 3,000 and 8,000 people participated in the funeral procession to pay their respects. He was buried at the nearby Baiin-Zen-Ji temple. He received the posthumous name "Seikiryou Kenyuuzan Gikaikouji". The name of the priest was Yoshimi Oyama.

== Legacy ==
=== Successors ===
The group that succeeded Jirocho was regarded as members of the underworld with mob syndicate status by the police. The successors of Jirocho tarnished his public image as an entrepreneur and robin hood figure who crushed the strong and helped the weak as a yakuza boss. This is why Kingo Tanabe (fifth-generation Shimizu family leader) dissolved the group in 1961. Tanabe wrote in his book "At the very least, I don't want to hand the (Shimizu 'family') crest over to a gangster organization that frightens decent people." However, later Tanabe sold the Shimizu emblem for circa tens of millions of yen to Yasuo Takagi (head of the Goryo-kai and thereafter the Mio-gumi gang). Tanabe didn't clarify why he sold it, but he had deteriorating health and needed the money. The Mio-gumi wanted the upscale Shimizu crest to recover from their billions of yen in loan-shark losses when Takagi was arrested in 2003. This caused the Shizuoka tourism association to remove Shimizu souvenirs to distance themselves from the yakuza.

=== Memorials ===
There are big memorials of Jirocho at the Baiin-Zen-Ji and Tesshuji temples in Shizuoka. His efforts to create Shimizu Port is also part of his memorial and legacy.

=== Museum ===
A bronze statue of Jirocho is located at Baiin-Zen-Ji temple (梅蔭禅寺) in (3-8 Minamiokamachi, Shimizu Ward, Shizuoka, 424–0932, Japan). The temple also houses the tombs of Shimizu no Jirocho, his wife Ocho (お蝶), Omasa (大政) and Komasa (小政). In 2001, the old Suehiro Inn was reconstructed with mostly original Meiji era materials that were recovered on the same location in 1999. Nowadays, it is a small museum with relics about Jirocho's life and his contributions to Shimizu Port.

=== Film and television ===
Jirocho has been featured in many movies and TV dramas. Since 1912 over 100 movies were produced about Jirocho and dozens of books. The publicity helped to revitalize the city.
