= Kensei (honorary title) =

Japanese title honoring swordsmanship

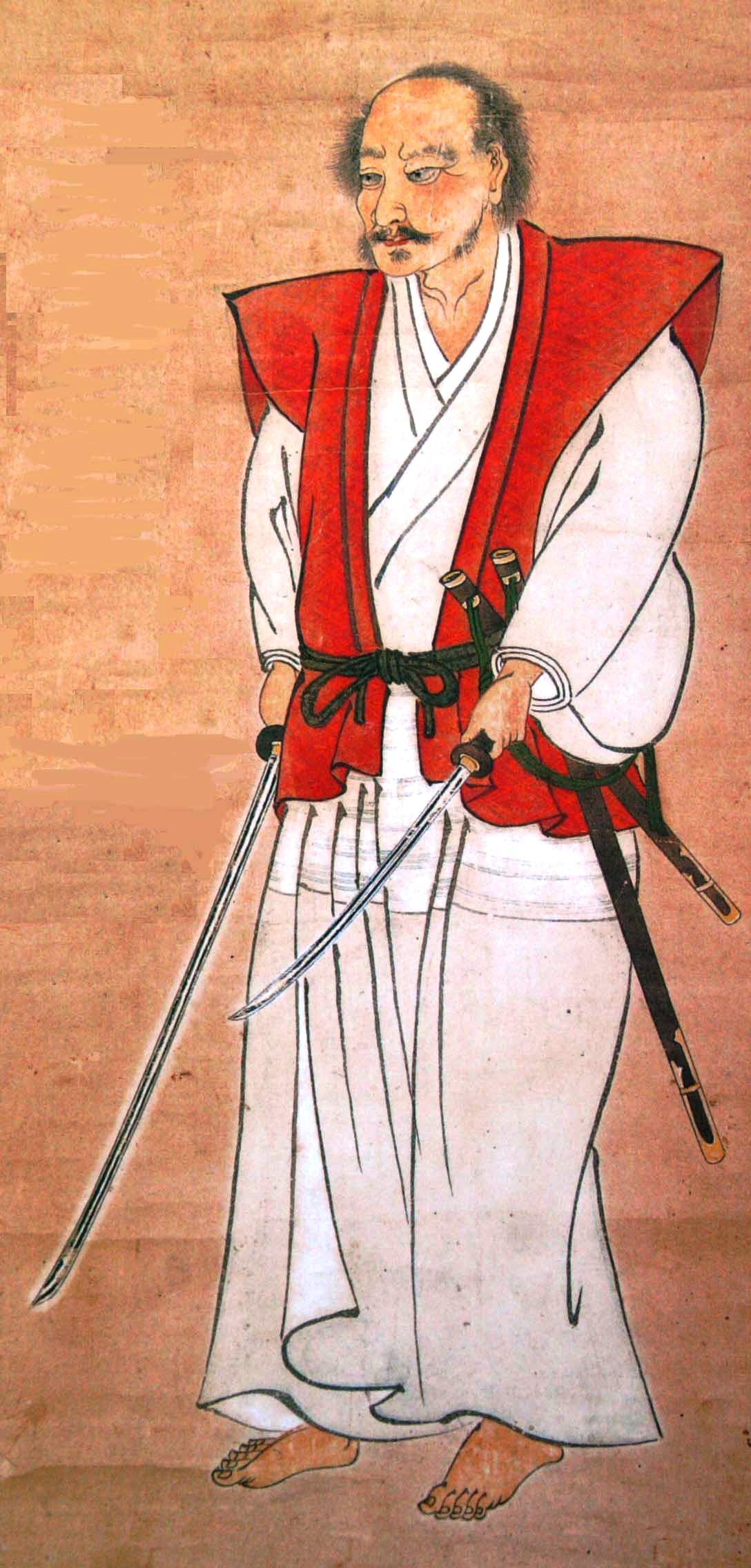
Miyamoto Musashi, Self-portrait, Samurai, writer and artist, c. 1640

Kensei (Japanese: 剣聖) is a Japanese honorary title given to a master swordsman of the very greatest level of skill. The literal translation of kensei is "sword saint". This suggests a higher degree of perfection (possibly also encompassing a moral dimension) than the more commonly used kengo (剣豪) or "sword master". This is distinct from the word kenshi (剣士), meaning swordsman.

== Famous kensei ==
- Tsukahara Bokuden 塚原 卜伝 (1489 – 6 March 1571), father and sword instructor of Shōgun Ashikaga Yoshiteru.
- Kamiizumi Isenokami Nobutsuna 上泉 伊勢守 信綱 (c.1508 – 1572/1577), central figure in the development of kenjutsu and founder of the Shinkage-ryu school of combat.
- Miyamoto Musashi 宮本 武蔵 (c. 1584 – 13 June 1645), one of the most famous swordmasters to have received the title.
- Shūsaku Narimasa Chiba 千葉 周作 成政 (1792 – 17 January 1855), one of the last masters who was called a kensei.
- Otani Nobutomo 男谷 信友 (1798–1864), a master of the Kashima Shinden Jikishinkage-ryū of kenjutsu, a commissioner of the Kōbusho military academy.
