= Midway (fair) =

Fair location

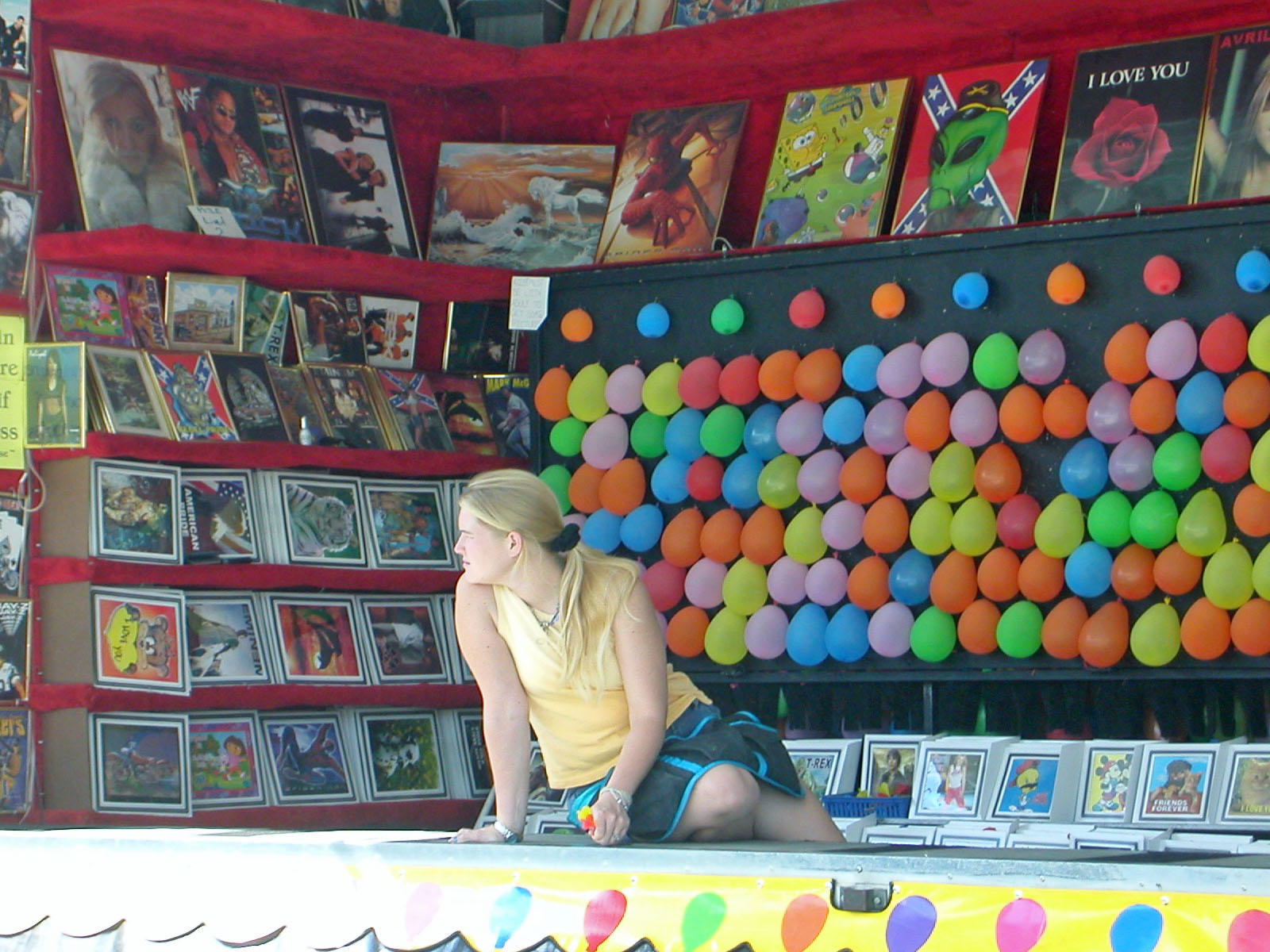
A game of popping balloons with darts for prizes—a common part of a carnival or fair midway

A midway at a fair (commonly an American fair such as a county or state fair) is the location where carnival games, amusement rides, entertainment, dime stores, themed events, exhibitions and trade shows, pleasure gardens, water parks and food booths cluster. The midway is located between the entrance and the big top of a circus; thus, a carnival is essentially a travelling midway.

== Origin ==
The term originated from the World's Columbian Exposition held in Chicago, Illinois, in 1893. It was the first world's fair with an area for amusements which was strictly separated from the exhibition halls. This area, which was concentrated on the city's Midway Plaisance created for the Exposition, included amusement rides (among them the original Ferris Wheel), belly dancers, balloon rides, concession stands, and other attractions.

After the Exposition, the term midway came into use as a common noun in the United States and Canada to refer to the area for amusements at a county or state fair, circus, festival, or amusement park.

== Attractions ==
Attractions that have been found in midways throughout history include the following:

- Concession stands selling a variety of different types of food and drink including fruit, pastries, pies, wine, lemonade, popcorn, ice cream, confectionery, and fairy floss
- Carnival games, including various games of skill, games of chance, and cons (such as three-card Monte and the shell game)
- Carnival rides such as the Ferris wheel and carousel
- Sideshows such as illusion shows, menageries, wax shows, and burlesque

== See also ==
- Traveling carnival
- Family entertainment center
- Sideshow alley
- Showbag
- Tekiya
- Carny
