= Tekiya =

Traditional Japanese itinerant peddlers organization

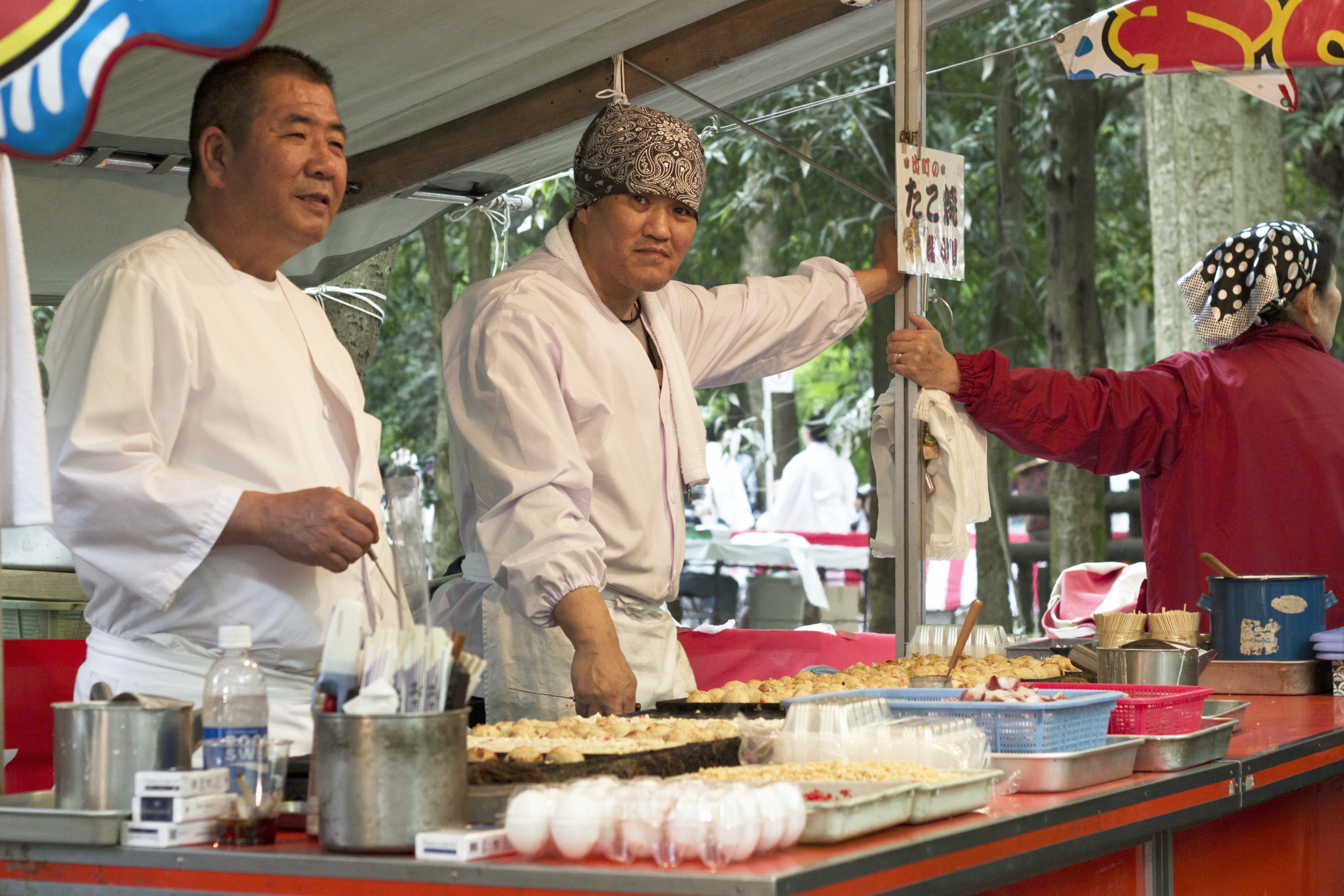
Tekiya on the grounds of Shimogamo Shrine in Kyoto

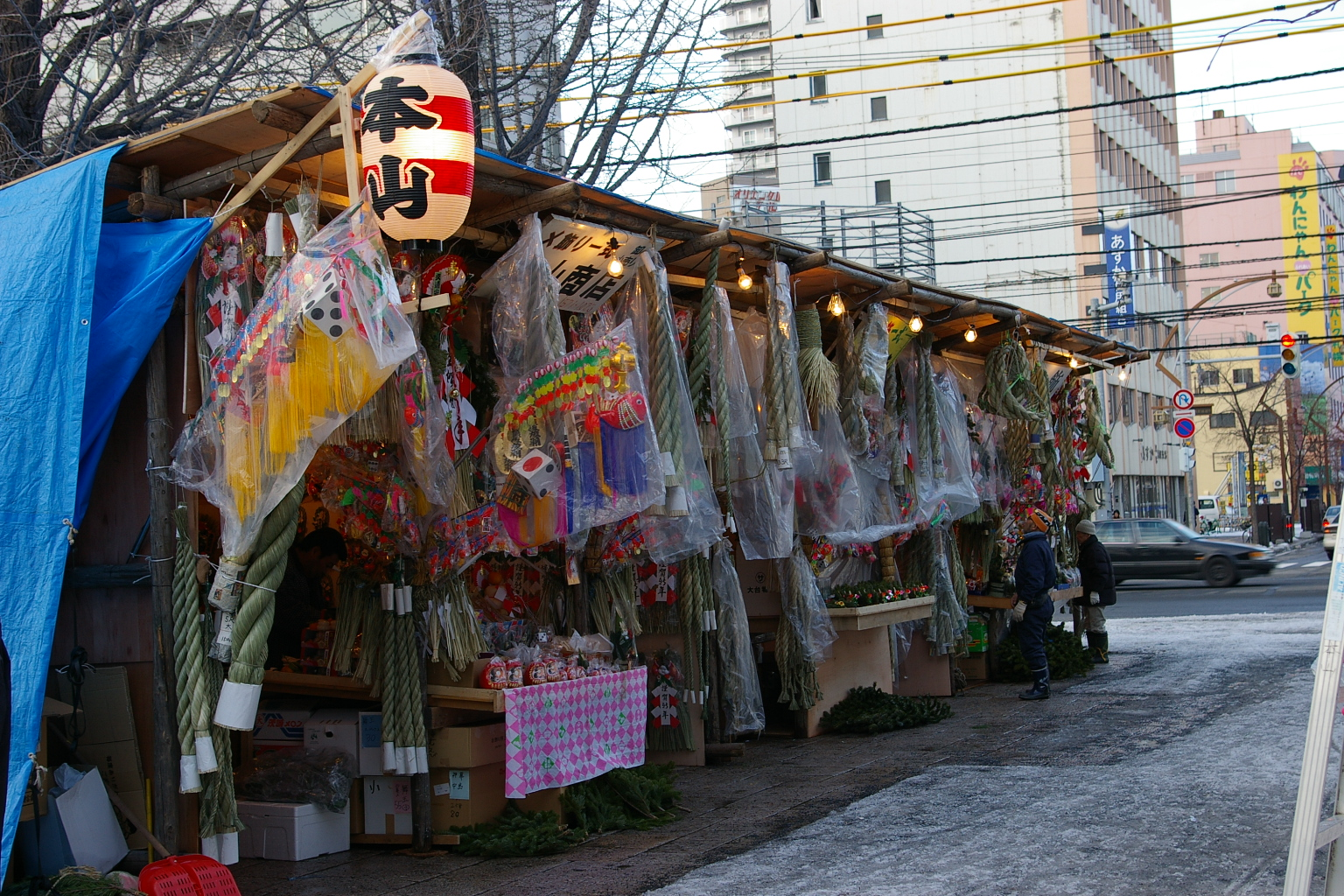
Tekiya selling talismans and decorations

Tekiya (的屋 or テキ屋; "peddlers") are itinerant Japanese merchants who, along with the bakuto ("gamblers"), historically were predecessors to the modern yakuza. A loose American equivalent of the tekiya could be seen in carnies.

== History ==
Tekiya ranked as one of the lowest social groups during the Edo period. As they began to form organizations of their own, they took over some administrative duties relating to commerce, such as stall allocation and protection of their commercial activities. During Shinto festivals, these peddlers opened stalls and some members were hired to act as security. Each peddler paid rent in exchange for a stall assignment and protection during the fair.

The tekiya were a highly structured and hierarchical group with the oyabun (boss) at the top and kobun (gang members) at the bottom. This hierarchy resembles a structure similar to the family – in traditional Japanese culture, the oyabun was often regarded as a surrogate father, and the kobun as surrogate children. During the Edo period, the government formally recognized the tekiya. At this time, within the tekiya, the oyabun were appointed as supervisors and granted near-samurai status, meaning they were allowed the dignity of a surname and two swords.

Unlike the bakuto who gamble (gambling was and still is illegal in Japan), the tekiya's line of work was generally legal. However, they also engaged in illicit activities such as the creation of protection rackets and would sometimes engage in gang warfare with other groups. In addition, their itinerant lifestyle often attracted fugitives to join their ranks.

Although the tekiya/bakuto lines have been blurred with the emergence of the modern Japanese yakuza in the 20th century, many of today's yakuza still identify with one group over the other.

== See also ==
- Midway (fair)
