= Hokushin Ittō-ryū =

School of traditional Japanese martial arts founded

Hokushin Ittō-ryū (北辰一刀流)
- Ko-ryū

Foundation
- Founder: Chiba Shūsaku Taira no Narimasa (千葉 周作 平 成政)
- Date founded: c. 1820
- Period founded: Late Edo period
- Location founded: Edo, Japan

Current information
- Current headmaster: Various lineages are still extant and taught

Arts taught
- Art: Description
- Kenjutsu: Sword art – long and short sword
- Battojutsu/Iaijutsu: Sword drawing art
- Naginatajutsu: Glaive art
- Gekiken: Sparring

Ancestor schools
- Hokushin Musō-ryu (北辰夢想流); Ittō-ryū (一刀流)

Descendant schools
- Chūka-Ittō-ryu; Itto Shoden Muto-ryu; Tenshin Ittō-ryu; Various other schools

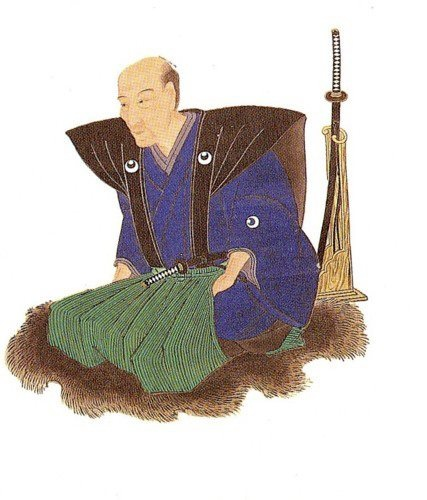
Chiba Shūsaku Narimasa

Hokushin Ittō-ryū (北辰一刀流) is a koryū (古流, school of traditional Japanese art, in this instance martial arts) that was founded in the late Edo period by Chiba Shusaku Narimasa (千葉周作成政; 1794–1856). He was one of the last masters who was called a kensei ('sword saint').

== Curriculum and Characteristics ==
The curriculum of this ryūha (martial arts style) contains mainly kenjutsu, iaijutsu/battōjutsu, and naginatajutsu, but the main weapons used are the long and short swords (katana and wakizashi).

Hokushin Ittō-ryū is a school of Japanese swordsmanship that emphasizes efficient techniques and minimizing extraneous movement. A central principle of the style is control of the enemy's center line, often with the kiri-otoshi technique, involving cutting down the opponent's sword, which is regarded as a defining technique of Ittō-ryū. The tradition emphasizes tsuki-waza (thrusting techniques). The ideal technique involves defense and offense in a single action.

Characteristic of the training is the use of onigote (heavily padded gloves) like in its ancestor styles Ono-ha Ittō-ryū and Nakanishi-ha Ittō-ryū, which are used in several kumitachi-kata (two person practice). This kind of training became more and more obsolete towards the end of the Edo period with the spread of gekiken (full contact duels with bamboo training swords and training armour) and the use of bōgu (training armour) and shinai (bamboo training sword).

Hokushin Ittō-ryū is also one of the remaining ryūha which still practices kumitachi with bokuto (wooden swords). The habiki kata is practiced using habiki (real swords with the sharp edge removed).

Hokushin Ittō-ryū also includes Iaijutsu (Hokushin-ryū iai (北辰流居合)). Today only a few teachers know the techniques. Some techniques are depicted in old papers in the Kumamoto prefectural library. It is a very simple form of iaijutsu, with 4 kata while seated (reacting to an enemy in front or behind), 4 kata while standing (reacting to an enemy in front or behind), and 3 kata with hiki-waza (stepping backwards).

In the Noda-Konishi line, some kata have been added to Gogyō-no-kata (五行の形) and Battōjutsu (抜刀術).

Gogyō-no-kata has five kumitachi and three kodachi-gumi which look very similar to Koshi-Gogyō-no-kata (高師五行の形), which were the Nakanishi-ha's kata as revised by Takano Sasaburo (高野佐三郎) in 1908.

In 1932, Noda Wasaburo (野田和三郎) and Kobayashi Sadayuki (小林定之) demonstrated seven kumitachi and three kodachi-gumi as Hokushin Ittō-ryū at Kyoto-Butokuden (京都武徳殿). The number of kumitachi kata is two more than in the Gogyō-no-kata.

Battōjutsu is not the Chiba family's Hokushin-ryū iai. The kata names and techniques were introduced by Konishi Shigejirō (refer to Kendo Nippon, Mar. 1978 12–15), but the techniques and the kata names differ from the Edo-Meiji period's densho texts. For example, Unryū-ken (雲龍剣), Hien-gaeshi (飛燕返) and Taihō-ken (大鵬剣).

== Famous swordsmen ==
Towards the end of the Bakumatsu period (1853-1867), the Hokushin Ittō-ryū was one of the three biggest and most famous ryūha all over Japan. Swordsmen of the Hokushin Ittō-ryū had a strong influence on the development of modern kendō in the late 19th century. Also many famous and politically influential people were masters of this swordsmanship school.

Some of the most prominent figures are:

- Chiba Sana (千葉さな) (Daughter of the 1st Chiba-Dōjō headmaster, also known as Chiba Sanako)
- Hoshino Amachi (星野天知) (Novelist, scientist, also Yagyū Shingan-ryū shihan)
- Itō Kashitarō (伊藤甲子太郎) (Military advisor of the Shinsengumi)
- Kiyokawa Hachirō (清河八郎) (Founder of the Kiyokawa-school and Roshigumi)
- Mochida Moriji (持田盛二) (One of the most famous kendoka of the 20th century)
- Monna Tadashi (門奈正) (A key developer of modern kendo)
- Naitō Takaharu (内藤高治) (A key developer of modern kendo)
- Negishi Shorei (根岸松齢) (13th Sōke of the Annaka-han Araki-ryū and founder of the Negishi-ryū (Shurikenjutsu))
- Okada Sadagoro (岡田定五郎) (Famous swordsman of the Bakumatsu and Meiji period and 14th Sōke of the Annaka-han Araki-ryū)
- Sakamoto Ryōma (坂本龍馬) (Famous revolutionary)
- Sakurada Sakuramaro (櫻田櫻麿) (Master of Ono-ha Ittō-ryū, Hokushin Ittō-ryū, founder of Chūka-Ittō-ryū (中和一刀流)
- Shibusawa Eiichi (渋沢 栄一) (Shogunate retainer and later Meiji government official, pioneering industrialist, banker and philanthropist)
- Suzuki Naonoshin (鈴木直之進) (Master of Yagyū Shingan-ryū, Ono-ha Ittō-ryū, Hokushin Ittō-ryū, and founder of Tenshin Ittō-ryū (天辰一刀流)
- Takano Sasaburo (高野佐三郎) (A key developer of modern kendo)
- Tōdō Heisuke (藤堂平助) (Captain of the 8th squad of the Shinsengumi)
- Yamanami Keisuke (山南敬介) (Vice commander of the Shinsengumi)
- Yamaoka Tesshū (山岡鉄舟) (Founder of the Ittō Shōden Mutō-ryū)
- Yoshimura Kanichirō (吉村貫一郎) (Kenjutsu instructor of the Shinsengumi)

== Ranking System ==
The Hokushin Ittō-ryū has three teaching steps:

- Shoden (初伝) (entry-transmission)
- Chūden (中伝) (middle-transmission)
- Okuden (奥伝) (inner-transmission)

Like many other koryū, Hokushin Ittō-ryū traditionally awards makimono-scrolls and/or inka-jō. There is no modern dan/kyū system in this school. The traditional five scrolls of Hokushin Ittō-ryū are:

1. Kirigami (剪紙)
2. Hatsumokuroku (初目録)
3. Kajōmokuroku / Seigandenju (箇条目録 / 星眼伝授)
4. Chūmokuroku / Menkyo (中目録 / 免許) (full transmission of all techniques)
5. Daimokuroku / Menkyo-Kaiden (大目録 / 免許皆伝) (full transmission of the ryūha)

The so-called Naginata Mokuroku (長刀目録) also exists and is normally issued together with the Menkyo (Chūmokuroku). It certifies the mastery of all naginatajutsu techniques of the school. Some names of the naginata kata are the same as those in the Hokushin Musō-ryū (北辰夢想流) densho (伝書).

In the Tottori-han (鳥取藩), the Sadakichi line (定吉系) also awarded Hon-mokuroku (本目録) like Ono-ha Ittō-ryū (see the Sadakichi line's densho collected in Tottori prefectural museum (鳥取県立博物館) ). However, the Shusaku line (周作系) had only three Mokuroku, which are the Hatsumokuroku (初目録), the Chūmokuroku-Menkyo (中目録免許) and the Daimokuroku-Kaiden (大目録皆伝), so written in the "Kenpo Hiketsu" by Chiba Shusaku (千葉周作「剣法秘訣」).

During the Bakumatsu period, Hokushin Ittō-ryū was very popular due to the decreased number of mokuroku down to only 3, from the 8 of the Ono-ha Ittō-ryū. In all Bujutsu ryūha, students have to pay money or send gifts to the instructor when issued with a mokuroku, therefore Hokushin Ittō-ryū was a more accessible ryūha for poorer farmers and bushi. Also, a number of the students joined the coup of the Edo Bakufu with other students from newer ryūha, such as those from Shinto Munen-ryū.

== Lineage ==
=== Edo-Genbukan (extinct) ===
- 1st Chiba Shūsaku Narimasa (千葉周作成政)
- 2nd Chiba Kisotarō Takatane (千葉寄蘇太郎高胤)
- 3rd Chiba Eijirō Nariyuki (千葉栄二郎成之) (he led the Edo-Genbukan until his death in 1862)
- 4th Chiba Michisaburō Mitsutane (千葉道三郎光胤)
- 5th Chiba Shūnosuke Koretane (千葉周之助之胤)

Chiba Shūnosuke Koretane restored the Edo-Genbukan in 1883 with the help of Inoue Hachirō and Yamaoka Tesshū. The Edo-Genbukan was closed between the 20th–30th year of the Meiji-period. The exact date is unknown.

=== Chiba family Seiden (revived, Ryūgasaki 龍ヶ崎) ===
- 1st Chiba Shūsaku Narimasa 千葉周作成政
- 2nd Chiba Eijirō Nariyuki 千葉栄二郎成之 (he led the Genbukan until his death in 1862)
- 3rd Chiba Michisaburō Mitsutane 千葉道三郎光胤
- 4th Chiba Einosuke 千葉英之助 (He did not practice Hokushin Ittō-ryū)
- 5th Chiba Masatane 千葉雅胤 (He did not practice Hokushin Ittō-ryū)
- 6th Chiba Yoshitane 千葉吉胤 (He did not practice Hokushin Ittō-ryū)
- 7th Shiina Kazue 椎名市衛 (He claims to have practiced Hokushin Ittō-ryū under Yajima Saburo (谷島三郎), who practiced under the Tobukan 3rd generation headmaster Kozawa Toyokichi (小澤豊吉))

This Hokushin Ittō-ryū line ended with the 3rd generation headmaster, Chiba Michisaburo. However Shiina Kazue managed to find Chiba Michisaburo's progeny, Chiba Yoshitane, who did not practice Hokushin Ittō-ryū. Shiina Kazue became Sōke in 2013.

=== Chiba-Dōjō (Revived) ===
- 1st Chiba Sadakichi Masamichi 千葉定吉政道
- 2nd Chiba Jūtarō Kazutane 千葉重太郎一胤
- 3rd Chiba Tō-ichirō Kiyomitsu 千葉統一郎清光
- 4th Chiba Tsukane 千葉束
- 5th Chiba Hiroshi Masatane 千葉弘 (He did not practice Hokushin Ittō-ryū)
- 6th Ōtsuka Yōichirō 大塚洋一郎 (He practiced Hokushin Ittō-ryū under Konishi Shigejirō (小西重治郎))
- 7th Ōtsuka Ryūnosuke 大塚龍之介 (He practiced Hokushin Ittō-ryū under Konishi Shigejirō and Ōtsuka Yōichirō)

The Chiba-Dōjō of Chiba Sadakichi Masamichi (younger brother of school's founder) became one of the most famous Dōjō all over Japan after its founding in the late 1840s. The teaching-line of the Edo-Genbukan disappeared soon after the Dōjō was closed at the end of the Meiji period. The Chiba-Dōjō was also closed at the beginning of the Taisho period. The Chiba family, which did not practice the school but owned the family documents has survived until today. The 5th generation head of the family, Chiba Hiroshi, did not practice or train in the school, nor was there anyone actively practicing under him. Therefore, he renounced his family's claims and documents to Ōtsuka Yōichirō Masanori, the 6th Sōke who trained under Konishi Shigejirō of the Noda-ha Hokushin Ittō-ryū. Ōtsuka recreated the Chiba-line in 2013, and was then succeeded by a German citizen named Markus Lösch, who later was legally adopted by Ōtsuka Yōichirō and thus changed his name to Ōtsuka Ryūnosuke when he became Menkyo-Kaiden in 2014. He later was appointed the 7th Sōke in March 2016.

=== Regional Lines ===
At the middle of the Meiji-period there were many side branches, founded by pupils of the two main lines. One of the most famous was the Tobukan in Mito. It was established by Kozawa Torakichi, a student of the Edo-Genbukan. Kozawa Torakichi was also an instructor at the Kodokan (弘道館), the official clan school of the Mito-clan. After the Meiji-restoration and the abolishment of the traditional clan system the Kodokan was closed, so in order to continue teaching, Kozawa Torakichi opened his own Dōjō, the Tobukan. There he taught Hokushin Ittō-ryū together with Shin Tamiya-ryū (新田宮流抜刀術) and Suifu-ryū (水府流剣術). (Torakichi's second son Kozawa Jiro Atsunobu (小澤二郎篤信) inherited Suifu-ryū kenjutsu from his own other dōjō.) This Hokushin Ittō-ryū line is also the line of the school which is a member of the Nihon Kobudo Kyokai. Up until today, the Kozawa family is still preserving the teachings of its first headmaster at the Tobukan in Mito.

==== Mito-Tobukan (水戸東武館) ====
In the Tobukan there is no Hokushin Ittō-ryū "Sōke". Instead there exists a Hokushin Ittō-ryū "representative" (as described in the Nikon Kobudo kyokai homepage).

The family name "Kozawa" of the 3rd generation, Toyokichi, and the 4th generation, Takeshi are son-in-law taken into family with Ichiro's daughter (as described on the Tobukan homepage).

- 1st Kozawa Torakichi Masakata (小澤寅吉政方)
- 2nd Kozawa Ichiro Hirotake (小澤一郎弘武)
- 3rd Kozawa Toyokichi (小澤豊吉), Moriyama Shigeo (森山繁雄), Sato Nobuo (佐藤信雄)
- 4th Kozawa Takeshi (小澤武), Kozawa Kiyoko (小澤喜代子)
- 5th Kozawa Satoshi (小澤智), Osono Toshitsugu (小薗壽嗣)

==== Otaru-Genbukan 小樽玄武館 (Noda-ha) ====
(This dōjō is not to be mistaken for the Edo-Genbukan.)

Kobayashi Seijiro was granted the Inka-jo from Chiba Michisaburo, and opened the Shisei-kan dōjō in Tokyo. He did not have a son, so he adopted Katsuura Shiro, who was later granted a Hokushin Ittō-ryū menkyo. He then went to Otaru, Hokkaido for musha-shugyo. The master of Otaru Nanburo, Noda Wasaburo, approved of his kenjutsu and personality. His daughter Haru married Shiro, and Shiro was taken into family as Noda Shiro. In 1913, the Otaru Genbukan was constructed in Nanburo. Chiba Katsutaro (Michisaburo's second son) gave his permission to use the name Genbukan.

In 1933, 14 year-old Konishi Shigejirō became a disciple of Otaru Genbukan, becoming an assistant instructor in 1937. In 1938, Shigejirō joined the war. In 1944, Noda Shiro died. After the war in 1945, Shigejirō conceded the inheritance of the line to his senior Miura Yoshikatsu, but Shigejirō later inherited it from Yoshikatsu in turn.

In 1950, Shigejirō opened an outdoor dōjō in Zenpukuji temple park in Tokyo, and in the autumn constructed a proper dōjō, giving it the name Genbukan. Shigejirō died in 2009 at 90 years of age.

- 1st Noda Shiro 野田四郎 (founder of the Otaru-Genbukan)
- 2nd Kobayashi Yoshikatsu 小林義勝
- 3rd Konishi (Ono) Shigejirō 小西(小野)重治郎 (moved the dōjō to Tokyo and renamed it Suginami-Genbukan)
- 4th Konishi Shin'en Kazuyuki 小西真円一之

The Chiba dōjō's 6th Sōke, Ōtsuka Yōichirō, was a student of Konishi Shigejirō.

==== Hokushin Ittoryu Kotōkan (北辰一刀流 虎韜館) ====
A student of Konishi Shigejirō, Tsukada Yoshikazu, Takano Sanetora (高野眞虎) teaches in his dōjō called Kotōkan in Nagano.

They are training in gymnasiums and the historical Matsushiro Literary and Military School. This building was built in the Bakumatsu period, the construction is based on the Kodōkan (弘道館) in Mito (水戸).

==== Sakurada Hokushin Ittō-ryū (櫻田北辰一刀流) ====
Sakurada Sakuramaro (櫻田櫻麿) was the Sendai-han's instructor of the Hokushin Ittō-ryū in Edo period.) He started the Chūka-Ittō-ryū (中和一刀流) in Sendai.

In the 20th century, Tsumura Keiji claimed that he had inherited Sakurada Sakuramaro's Hokushin Ittō-ryū line.

The inheritance tree contains several strange points. In any case, he and his students are training Ittō-ryū kumitachi kata. They are now training in Shushinkai (修心会).

- 1st Tsumura Keiji (津村恵治)
- 2nd Seki Nobuhide (関展秀)
