= Yubitsume =

Japanese finger amputation ritual

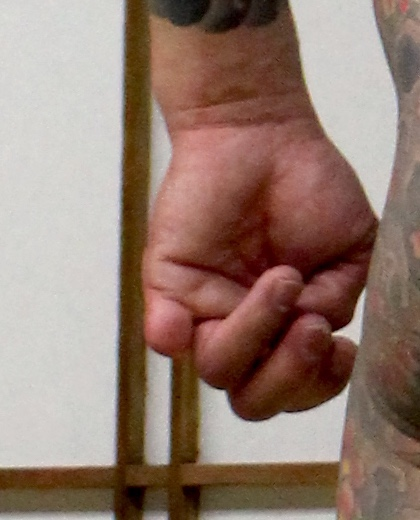
Man's hand showing yubitsume, with the upper two portions of the little finger having been removed

Yubitsume (指詰め; 'finger shortening') or otoshimae is a Japanese ritual to atone for offenses to another, a way to be punished or to show sincere apology and remorse to another, by means of amputating portions of one's own little finger. In modern times, it is primarily performed by the yakuza, a collection of Japanese criminal organizations.

== Origin ==
The ritual is thought to have originated with the bakuto, itinerant gamblers who were predecessors of the modern yakuza. If a person was unable to pay off a gambling debt, yubitsume was sometimes considered an alternative form of repayment. Yubitsume was a form of credit and reputation score.

Yubitsume is also a sign of surrender by the defeated in a yakuza war. The reason for this is that in Japanese swordsmanship (kendo and iaido), the sword cannot be held tightly, and the little finger's grip is the tightest on the hilt. A little-finger amputee was therefore unable to grip his sword properly, weakening him in battle and making him more dependent on the protection of his boss, and thus overall weakening the family's ability to fight in a war. As such, it can be seen as a sign of insurance of compliance with the terms of truce imposed upon the loser by the victor.

== Ritual details ==
To perform yubitsume, one lays down a small clean cloth and lays the hand onto the cloth facing down. Using an extremely sharp knife, or tantō, the person cuts off the portion of his left little finger above the top knuckle on the finger or the tip of the finger. He then wraps the severed portion in the cloth and submits the "package" very graciously to his oyabun ("godfather" or boss), who is also referred to as a kumicho (patriarch/head of the family) – or to whomever this gesture of atonement is made, if it is not to his own boss.

If more offenses are committed, then the person moves on to the next joint of the finger to perform yubitsume. More infractions could mean removing portions of the right little finger when no more joints of the left finger remain. In some cases, a person expelled from a yakuza gang might be required to perform the yubitsume ritual.

The finger of the yakuza directly responsible for an offense is called an shinu yubi, "dead finger", while the finger of the yakuza that is directly in charge of him is called a iki yubi, "living finger".
