= Kashima Shinden Jikishinkage-ryū =

Japanese sword-based martial art

Kashima Shinden Jikishinkage-ryū (鹿島神傳直心影流)
- Ko-ryū
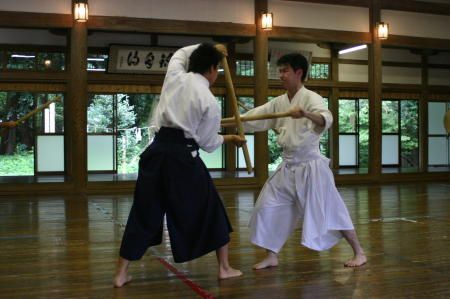

Foundation
- Founder: Matsumoto (Sugimoto) Bizen-no-Kami Naokatsu (松本 備前守 尚勝)
- Date founded: c. 1570
- Period founded: Late Muromachi period (1336–1573)
- Location founded: Kashima (鹿嶋市), Japan (日本)

Current information
- Current headmaster: Various lineages are still extant and taught

Arts taught
- Art: Description
- Kenjutsu – ōdachi and kodachi: Sword art – long and short sword

Ancestor schools
- Kage-ryū (Aizu); Shinkage-ryū; Kashima Shinryu

Descendant schools
- Daitō-ryū; Shindō Yōshin-ryū; Shintō Musō-ryū

Kashima Shinden Jikishinkage-ryū (鹿島神傳直心影流, かしましんでんじきしんかげりゅう), often referred to simply as Jikishinkage-ryū or Kashima Shinden, is a traditional school (koryū) of the Japanese martial art of swordsmanship (kenjutsu). The school was founded in the mid-16th century, based upon older styles of swordsmanship, and is one of the few ancient Japanese martial arts schools still existing today.

Kashima Shinden Jikishinkage-ryū can be translated as the "divinely transmitted, honest reflection of the heart, school of Kashima".

By repetitive practice, one maintains a constant connection with the cosmos by aspiring to jikishin (直心) unwavering intention and seimeishin (生命心) perfect clarity of mind, just like a cloudless sky on a brilliant sunny day. A practitioner who has attained heightened jikishin and seimeishin is said to have fudōshin (不動心) immovable heart.

== History ==
The Jikishinkage-ryū style descends from the kenjutsu styles developed in the late Muromachi period which overlaps the early Sengoku period, or better dated as late 15th or early 16th century, at the Kashima Shrine by the founder, Matsumoto Bizen-no-Kami Naokatsu (松本 備前守 尚勝, 1467–1524). The direct predecessors of the Jikishinkage-ryū style are the Shinkage-ryū and the Kage-ryū (Aizu) styles.

The Jikishin Kage-ryū Kenjutsu comes from a previous school, Kage-ryū Kenjutsu. A samurai (侍) called Aisu Iko founded Kage-ryū in 1490. He perfected and taught his style around Japan. There is evidence from 1525 that another samurai named Kamiizumi Ise-no-Kami Nobutsuna (1508–1548) was teaching his own style, a form of Kage-ryū kenjutsu. He called it Shinkage-ryū (the school of the new shadow). Jikishin Kage-ryū means 'the newest school of the ancient shadow'. He was denoting with the name, to the ancestors, and expressing respect to his former masters. Matsumoto Bizen no Kami Naokatsu was a famous master of this school. He also founded his own school first called Kashima Shin-ryū, then Kashima Shinden Jiki Shinkage-ryū. These schools can be found even today all around the world. There are more variations like Jikishin Kage-ryū, Seito Shinkage-ryū, etc.

During the 19th century, Jiki Shinkage-ryū was one of the most popular schools of combative swordsmanship (kenjutsu) in eastern Japan, especially in the Edo area. The 14th headmaster or sōke (宗家) of Jikishin Kage-ryū Kenjutsu—Sakakibara Kenkichi—was one of the most well-known swordsmen of his time, and the personal bodyguard of the Shōgun.

Sakakibara had hundreds of students during his lifetime, many of them rising to the "rank" of menkyo kaiden (免許皆伝) and shihan (師範), thus able to pass on the full tradition. At least 20 menkyo kaiden can be found in official listing of successors. Some of them derived their own branch lines. His most talented disciple was Yamada Jirokichi (山田 次朗) from whom the Seito-ha (正統派), which means main line system or traditional school.

A less well-known, but highly skilled, menkyo kaiden ranked student was Matsudaira Yasutoshi, who, like Yamada Jirokichi, studied the more traditional ways of Jikishin Kage-ryū. The best apprentice of Yasutoshi was Makita Shigekatsu, a young man from a samurai family from Hokkaidō. His name and Jikishin Kage-ryū became famous on the northern island in the times of the Japanese civil war in 1868. By sword fighting, he was an expert in kyūdō (弓道), Japanese archery. He was the heir of the title of shihan of Jikishinkage-ryū, but unfortunately, he was fighting a losing battle against the Emperor in the revolution. The cast of the samurai was disbanded, and he had to run. Later, he returned to Hokkaidō, and opened his own dōjō, called Jikishin Kan Dōjō. He was teaching various martial arts, not just kenjutsu. His dōjō was popular, in spite of the prohibition of the katana in 1876.

After Shigekatsu's death, the village of Atsuta raised a black granite obelisk in his memory. This memorial can be seen today. The family tradition has been taken by his grandson, Kimiyoshi Suzuki. Suzuki sensei is also a master of Gōjū-ryū karate and Jikishin Kage-ryū Kenjutsu. Suzuki Kimiyoshi earned his menkyo kaiden at the Naganuma-ha. But he regards his work as a teacher as the continuation of his grandfather’s, Makita Shigekatsu legacy, so he named his school "Makita-ha". This is why he shows up twice. His school, founded in 1992, Hungary is named Shinbukan Dojo.

Suzuki Kimiyoshi received the state award Hungarian Bronze Cross of Merit, acknowledging his activity in popularizing the Far-Eastern martial arts and introducing the Japanese kenjutsu fencing in Hungary. The award, proposed by Prime Minister, Mr. Viktor Orbán, on the occasion of state holiday 20 August was granted to sensei Suzuki at the end of July by the President of Republic, Mr. János Áder. The award was presented on the 18th of August, 2017 by the Minister of Human Resources, Mr. Zoltán Balog in the great hall of the Budapest Vigadó.

There were many other famous practitioners of Jiki Shinkage-ryū under Sakakibara who did not reach the highest levels of the system and consequently were not named as successors. Perhaps the most famous of these was Sōkaku Takeda, founder of Daitō-ryū Aiki-jūjutsu. In contrast, some writers have claimed that other famous historical personages such as Musō Gonnosuke were in the line of transmission of Jiki Shinkage-ryū. However, Gonnosuke was never in the direct lineage of Jiki Shinkage-ryū.

== Characteristics ==
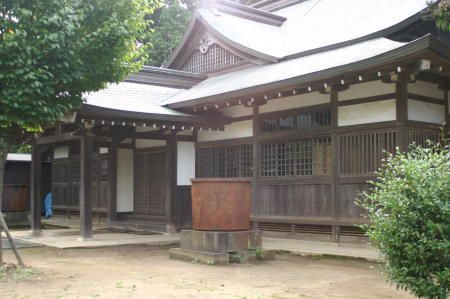
Dōjō at Kashima Shinden. Kashima city, Ibaraki Prefecture, Japan

The Jikishinkage-ryū style has many differences when compared to modern kendō, especially in its footwork and breathing techniques.

The unpō (運法) is the footwork used in the Jikishinkage-ryū style and can be translated as law, rule or method (for) transporting, conveying or carrying ('walking'). Unlike the suriashi of modern kendo, it is stressed that both feet stay firmly planted on the ground at all times. The kiai (気合) consists not only of the shouting, like most martial arts, but of the proper way of inhaling and state of mind as well. This is even more reflected in the synchronous deep breathing called Aum (唵) (or a-un) with one's partner which accompanies most movements.

Every kata (形) has two distinct roles called uchidachi (打太刀) the striking/attacking sword and shidachi (受太刀) the doing/receiving sword. Some parts of the kata are identical for both roles, like the kamihanen (上半円) upper semicircle and shimohanen (下半円) lower semicircle (also called johanen and gehanen). These are unconventional waza (技) techniques and characteristic for this style. Roughly, the swordsman draws a semicircle (upwards or downwards) with both his right hand (holding the sword), and his left hand (free). He finishes the movement with his arms extended, the sword pointing upwards, and the free hand's index finger pointing downwards. These movements can be considered as a greeting and a form of meditation, and are usually executed in the beginning and end of a kata or suburi (素振り) session. They represent all the things in heaven and all the things in earth, and the practitioner in the center of everything.

Another typical technique is the morōde (両腕) both arms movement in which uchidachi raises with both arms the sword of shidachi to jōdan and receives the subsequent uchikomi with the side of the blade. This results in thrusting the left arm forwards and turning both arms outwards to allow to absorb shidachi's cut which is in kiritsuki style like performed by a kaishakunin (介錯人).

Jikishinkage-ryū exponents train with both ōdachi (大太刀) and kodachi (小太刀) (but not both at once).

== Clothing ==
Kenjutsu was practiced in a thick kimono (keikogi) in the old times. It was needed for protection, though it was sometimes still not enough. Practices are far less dangerous nowadays, the standard clothes in kenjutsu are normal keikogi (稽古着) and hakama (袴). Preferably all pieces are in the same colour of dark blue or, when one seriously dedicates the practice to the kami (神), in white. To prevent treading on the hakama when moving in a low position, the hakama is raised a bit by neatly folding the left and right outside front pleats up under the straps which are tied around the waist, before training commences. It is possible to wear tabi (足袋) when necessary.

For outdoor practice, jika-tabi (地下足袋) are worn. As uchidachi always faces sun, this role can be very blinding, but it is not allowed to wear sunglasses or hats. However, in extremely cold conditions one can wear a hat (without sun reflector) and other extra protective clothing. When one has not enough hair or eyebrows or in extreme hot conditions, one can wear a tenugui (手拭い) or hachimaki (鉢巻) to prevent sweat irritating the eyes or to keep hair out of the face. Note that tabi and jiki-tabi should preferably match the colour of the hakama.

It is prohibited to wear jewellery and the like as is custom in many martial arts. This rule is to prevent injuries to oneself and practicing partner as it is to prevent excessive display of ego and unneeded distractions.

Some practitioners wear aikidogi (合気道着) or karategi (空手着). In some groups beginners wear white obi (帯), intermediates wear blue and brown obi and advanced wear black obi with hakama. Others practice in hakama without colored obi.

== Ranks ==
The following licenses exist the Seito-ha (main line recognized by Kashima Shrine).

rank	level	requirements
shomokuroku (初目録)	–	disciple must show competence in Hōjō no kata
jomokuroku (助目録)	–	disciple must show competence in Tō no kata
reikenden	–	disciple must show competence in Kodachi no kata
kyuri-no-maki	kyōshi (教師)	disciple must show deep understanding of the nature of Jikishinkage-ryū and show competence in Habiki no kata
goku-i	shihandai (師範弟)	disciple has been initiated in Marubashi no kata
menkyo (免許)	shihan (師範)	disciple has mastered the system

Over the years the trainee should begin showing competence in leading/teaching the system. Consequently, usually, but not always, the student receiving kyuri-no-maki is at the level of kyoshi (assistant instructor); the student receiving goku-i is at the level of shihandai (associate instructor); and the recipient of menkyo is at the level of shihan (master instructor). However, according to Yoshida Hijime (吉田基), the current (20th) headmaster of the Seito-ha, only a shihan may teach independently of the headmaster. A restriction not necessarily followed in other lines.

For Shinbukan, the following applies:

There wasn't anything like exams or ranks in the early Japan. When the master found his apprentice ready, he ordered him to show his knowledge. There were four levels in Jikishinkage-ryū. The reiken, the normal trainee level, the mokuroku and the kirkgami, the advanced level, and the highest menkyo kaiden, was the masters' level, and gave the owner the right to start teaching. The diplomas were hand-written, and contained every technique the examinees showed before the master. If the exam was successful, the new master could wear the hakama. This represented today's black belt. These things have changed nowadays, we use the same kyū (級) – dan (段) method as in most of the martial arts.

— Kimiyoshi Suzuki,

In some groups, hakama can only be worn by those who successfully completed their 1st dan exam. This is mainly done for practical reasons. One is that the teacher can see how the student positions his or her legs and feet. Another reason is that the teacher and students can quickly see whom to call upon for assistance. In more traditional groups, everyone wears hakama.

== Kihon ==
Basic technique and movements are shown in the table below.

category	basic	other
te no uchi (手の内) grip		
kamae (構) posture	gedan no kamae (下段の構); jōdan no kamae (上段の構); chūdan no kamae (中段の構) / seigan no kamae; hassō no kamae (八相の構)	gyaku hassō; waki gamae; irimi seigan; niō dachi; chokuritsu seigan; chokuritsu jodan; chokuritsu gedan; chokuritsu hassō; etc.
ashi sabaki (足捌き) foot work	unpō	okuri ashi; ayumi ashi; tsugi ashi (migi, hidari); soroe ashi; fumikomi ashi (migi, hidari); hiraki ashi (shomen, naname, soroe, etc.); kosa-ashi; kirikaeshi; etc.
seme-waza (attack)	shomen; yokomen; dogiri; tsuki (突き); kote; kesakiri; kiriage; tsubamegaeshi; ashikiri	tai-atari; ashi barai; atemi (seiken tsuki, uraken uchi, etc.); keri (mawashi geri, mae geri, etc.); nage (kotegaeshi, etc.); etc.
uke-waza (protect)	nagashi uke; suriage; ashidome; otoshi uke; harai uke; kaeshi uke	maki otoshi; shin no uke; nuki; osae uke; etc.
kiai	"a"; "um"	

== Traditional kata ==
The following five classical or orthodox kata are the only ones practiced in Japan today and were established in this order by the time of Yamada Heizaemon Ippusai in the late 17th century. Instead of the extension 'no kata', the kata in Yamada's book have the extension 'no bu' (之部), which means section (of this book). Kimiyoshi Suzuki's students in Jikishinkan also practice these classical katas and this lineage practises its own set of katas preparing for the classical ones.

=== Hōjō ===
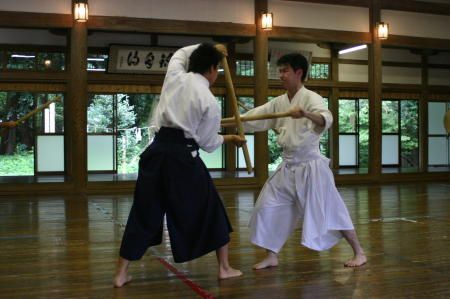
hōjō no kata, spring season

The hōjō no kata (法定之形) is the first classic kata of the Jikishinkage-ryū style and can be translated as laws, rules or methods ('principals') (which are) definitive, crucial or stable ('fundamental') or fundamental principals, i.e. the basics. Both the shidachi and the uchidachi usually use wooden swords, bokken (木剣) or bokutō (木刀), although real swords, shinken (真剣), can be used as well.

The hōjō no kata is composed of four stages which are named after the four seasons, namely haru (春) spring, natsu (夏) summer, aki (秋) autumn and fuyu (冬) winter in order of execution. Each season contains from six to eight waza (movement). Before each season is executed the kamihanen, and after each season, the shimohanen.

Each season has a respective pace, kōan (公案) theme, footwork, breathing, kiai, and other features reminiscent of the perceived characteristics of that season. Spring has waza which are executed in a smooth and fast manner, accompanied by loud kiai. The kōan of spring is eight-directions explosive-blast which can be translated as all directions. Summer has movements that are explosive and intense. The kōan of summer is one-sword both-cut which can be translated as cutting your ego. Autumn has a varied pace, symbolizing change. The kōan of autumn is right-turn left-turn which can be translated as times of change. Winter movements are slow, reserved but firm and efficient. This is even more accentuated on the footwork of each season. The kōan of winter is long-short one-body. The following example is an illustration of this principle. Imagine a situation where one person has a yari (槍) or naginata (長刀 or 薙刀), which stands for long, and the other a has sword, which stands for short, but the situation is as such that there is no more discussion, any discussion at this point would be superfluous. This metaphor tries to explain the meaning behind this kōan that in this season life and death are one.

The themes of the four seasons refer to universal principles which also express themselves in other manifestations. Some of these are listed in the table below.

stage	name	kōan	tempo	stage of life	time of day	temperature
ipponme (一本目); 1st stage	haru no tachi (春の太刀) spring sword	hassō happa (八相発破) eight-directions explosive-blast	acceleration	childhood	morning	warming
nihonme (ニ本目); 2nd stage	natsu no tachi (夏の太刀) summer sword	itto ryōdan (一刀両断) one-sword both-cut	fast	adolescence	afternoon	heat
sanbonme (三本目); 3rd stage	aki no tachi (秋の太刀) autumn sword	uten saten (右転左転) right-turn left-turn	deceleration	maturity	evening	cooling
yonhonme (四本目); 4th stage	fuyu no tachi (冬の太刀) winter sword	chotan ichimi (長短一身) long-short one-body	slow	old age	night	cold

Both uchidachi and shidachi take on a stance in spring and autumn which is called nio dachi. This refers to the pair of guardian deities of Buddhism called niō (仁王), which can be found as large statues at entrances of some of the ancient Japanese temples and shrines. The right statue is called Misshaku Kongō (密迹金剛) who has his mouth opened, this represents vocalization of "a." The left statue is called Naraen Kongō (那羅延金剛) who has his mouth closed, represents the vocalization of "um."

It is said that these two characters together symbolize the birth and death of all things, like we are born with "a" and our mouth open (inhale) and we die with "um" and our mouth closed (exhale). This is similar to "Alpha and Omega" or "A to Z" signifying "beginning and end", "everything" or "all creation." The contraction of both is Aum (Devanagari ॐ), which is an important concept in Sanskrit. The stances and expressions of the statues, the sounds "a" and "um" and the symbolism behind this are very import in the hōjō no kata.

The 15th headmaster wrote this on the meaning of the hōjō no kata:

As you live your life, you become hindered by all manner of impurities. Through the act continuously discarding these pollutants you must try to return to your original nature just as it was when you were a baby.

— Jirokichi Yamada,

=== Fukuro shinai no kata (tō no kata) ===
The fukuro shinai no kata (韜之形), or tō no kata as it is also named, is the second kata of the Jikishinkage-ryū style. The kanji 韜 is rare and old and is able to read as "tō" but has the meaning of fukuro (袋).

This kata is composed of fourteen stages, divided in six groups. Each stage has about four movements. This kata is characterized by very fast waza. Both the uchidachi and the shidachi use fukuro shinai (袋竹刀) which explains the origin on the name.

fukuro shinai no kata

stage	name
ipponme (一本目) 1st stage	ryubi hidari (龍尾 左) dragon tail left
nihonme (二本目) 2nd stage	ryubi migi (龍尾 右) dragon tail right
sanbonme (三本目) 3rd stage	omokage hidari (面影 左) face left
yonhonme (四本目) 4th stage	omokage migi (面影 右) face right
gohonme (五本目) 5th stage	teppa (鉄破) iron breaking
ropponme (六本目) 6th stage	teppa (鉄破) iron breaking
nanahonme (七本目) 7th stage	teppa (鉄破) iron breaking
hachihonme (八本目) 8th stage	teppa (鉄破) iron breaking
kyūhonme (九本目) 9th stage	matsukaze hidari (松風 左) (sound of) the wind through pine trees left
jūpponme (十本目) 10th stage	matsukaze migi (松風 右) (sound of) the wind through pine trees right
jūipponme (十一本目) 11th stage	hayafune hidari (早船 左) early boat left
jūnihonme (十二本目) 12th stage	hayafune migi (早船 右) early boat right
jūsanbonme (十三本目) 13th stage	kyoku-shaku (曲尺) carpenter's square (for checking angles)
jūyonhonme (十四本目) 14th stage	enren (圓連) circle take/bring

=== Kodachi no kata ===
The third kata in the ryū, the kodachi no kata (小太刀之形) has six stages. Shidachi uses a large heavy wooden kodachi (like the name of the kata), and uchidachi uses a standard kendo style bokuto or a fukuro shinai. All the three stages of this kata have shidachi running into "combat" with uchidachi. Jikishinkage-ryū is unique because the kodachi is used with two hands on the tsuka.

kodachi no kata

stage	name
ipponme (一本目) 1st stage	husei (風勢)
nihonme (二本目) 2nd stage	suisei (水勢)
sanbonme (三本目) 3rd stage	kissaki kaeshi (切先返)
yonhonme (四本目) 4th stage	tsuba-tori (chakin-fukusa) (鍔取 (茶巾袱紗))
gohonme (五本目) 5th stage	toppi-ouhi (突非押非)
ropponme (六本目) 6th stage	enkai (圓快)

=== Habiki no kata ===
The fourth kata is called habiki no kata (刃挽之形) or Koryū (古流) kata and it is a blend of concepts from hōjō no kata and fukuro shinai no kata. Both shidachi and uchidachi use habiki (a sword without a sharp edge) in this kata set. In several places both shidachi and uchidachi end up on one foot after cutting. There are four kata (the second and the third stages are in one block) in habiki no kata, and they are the old version of hōjō no kata.

stage	name
ipponme (一本目) 1st stage	hassō happa (八相発破)
nihonme (二本目) 2nd stage	itto ryōdan (一刀両断)
sanbonme (三本目) 3rd stage	uten saten (右転左転)
yonhonme (四本目) 4th stage	chotan ichimi (長短一身)

=== Marubashi no kata ===
The marubashi no kata (丸橋之形) is the most advanced kata, it focuses on very difficult kiai and subtle movement. To the casual observer it looks as though nothing is happening in the kata at all. Shidachi uses kodachi and uchidachi uses odachi. Like the last set of kata both use shinken.

This kata used to be a secret. It is not clear when the secrecy was lifted but the kata is, like the other five, described with text and photographs in the book of Yamada Jirokichi that was published in the early 20th century (1927).

stage	name
ipponme (一本目) 1st stage	hassōken (hasso) (八相剣) eight directions sword
nihonme (二本目) 2nd stage	teiken (hissa) (提剣) carry sword
sanbonme (三本目) 3rd stage	suishaken (suisha) (水車剣) water wheel sword
yonhonme (四本目) 4th stage	enkaiken (enkai) (圓快剣) comfortable circle sword
gohonme (五本目) 5th stage	marubashiken (embashi) (圓橋剣) circle sword

== List of representatives ==
The table below depicts the Kashima Shinden Jikishinkage-ryū kenjutsu lineage which spans over five centuries.

sōke	ryū name	Naganuma-ha	Shinbukan	Seito-ha	Hyakuren-kai			Nomi-ha	Makita-ha
founder	Kashima Shin(kage)ryū	Matsumoto (Sugimoto) Bizen-no-Kami (松本備前守, 1467–1524)							
2nd	Shinkage-ryū	Kamiizumi Ise-no-Kami Nobutsuna (上泉伊勢守信綱, 1508–1577)							
3rd	Shinkage-ryū	Okuyama Kyūkasai Taira no Kimishige (奥山休賀斎平公重, 1528–1602)							
4th	Shin Shinkage-ryū	Ogasawara Genshinsai Minamoto no Nagaharu (小笠原源信斎源長冶, 1574–1644)							
5th	Shinkage Jikishin-ryū	Kamiya Denshinsai Sadamitsu (神谷伝心斎直光, 1582–1663)							
6th	Jikishin Seitō-ichi-ryū	Takahashi Danjōzaemon Shigeharu (高橋弾正左衛門重治, 1610–1690)							
7th	Jikishinkage-ryū	Yamada Heizaemon Mitsunori (Ippūsai) (山田平左衛門光徳(一風斎), 1638–1718)							
8th	Jikishinkage-ryū	Naganuma Kunisato Shirozaemon (長沼四郎左衛門国郷, 1688–1767)							
9th	Jikishinkage-ryū	Naganuma Shirozaemon Fujiwara no Yorihito (長沼活然斎藤原綱郷, 1702–1772)							
10th	Jikishinkage-ryū	Naganuma Shirozaemon Sukesato		Fujikawa Yashirō Uemon Fujiwara no Yorihito (藤川彌司郎右衛門尉藤原近義, 1726–1798)					
11th	Jikishinkage-ryū	Naganuma Shirozaemon Masasato		Akaishi Chikayoshi (赤石近義, 1749–1825)					
12th	Jikishinkage-ryū	Naganuma Goro Yasusato		Dannō Gennoshin Yoshitaka (團野源之進義高, 1761–1849)					
13th	Jikishinkage-ryū	Naganuma Shirozaemon Katsusato		Odani Shimosa-no-kami Nobutomo (男谷下總守信友, 1798–1864)					
14th	Jikishinkage-ryū	Sakai Sukenojo Masatada		Sakakibara Kenkichi (榊原鍵吉, 1830–1894)					
15th	Jikishinkage-ryū	Sakai Jihei Tadaaki		Yamada Jirokichi (山田 次朗吉, 1863–1930)				Nomi Teijiro (野見錠次郎)	Matsudaira Yasutoshi (松平, 1835–1880)
16th	Jikishinkage-ryū	Sakai Kinjiro Tadaari		Kawashima Takashi (川島 堯)	–	Ōmori Sōgen (大森 曹玄, 1904–1994)		Nomi Hamao	Makita Shigekatsu (牧田 重勝, 1849–1914)
17th	Jikishinkage-ryū	Sakai Tokutaro		Ōnishi Hidetaka (大西英隆, 1906–1966)		Sasaki Gensō (佐々木 玄宗, b. 1947)	Terayama Katsujo (1938–2007)	Ishigaki Yasuzou (石垣安造)	Suzuki Kimiyoshi (鈴木公宜, 1934-)
18th	Jikishinkage-ryū	Sakai Katsuensai		Namiki Yasushi (並木靖, 1926–1999)	17th headmaster: [Hyakuren Kai; 1st Leader] Hayakawa Kōichi (早川幸市)	–	–	–	–
19th	Jikishinkage-ryū	Sakai Katsudensai Katsuya		Itō Masayuki (伊藤雅之, c. 1930–2001)	18th headmaster: [Hyakuren Kai; 2nd Leader] Iwasa Masaru (岩佐勝, 1945)	–	–	–	–
20th	Jikishinkage-ryū	Sakai Kazuya	Suzuki Kimiyoshi	Yoshida Hijime (吉田基, c. 1945)	–	–	–	–	–
headmaster	ryū name	Naganuma-ha	Shinbukan	Seito-ha	Hyakuren-kai			Nomi-ha	Makita-ha

== Present day practice ==
The table below lists places where groups currently are practicing Jikishinkage-ryū Kenjutsu can be found.

continent	country	city	kata	lineage
Asia	Japan	Tōkyō (東京)	all classical	Yoshida Hijime
Asia	Japan	Tōkyō (東京)	Naganuma curriculum	Shinbukai - Tokyo (Sakai Kazuya)
Asia	Japan	Kōbe (神戸市)	all classical	
Asia	Japan	Yokohama (横浜市)	all classical	
Europe	Czech Republic	Prague	Hōjō	Namiki Yasushi via Masatomi Ikeda
Europe	Germany	Berlin	classical and Shinbukan katas	Shinbukan
Europe	Germany	Friedberg, Hesse	classical and Shinbukan katas	Shinbukan
Europe	Germany	Schraplau, Saxony-Anhalt	classical and Shinbukan katas	Shinbukan
Europe	Germany	Reutlingen, Baden Wurttemberg	classical and Shinbukan katas	Shinbukan
Europe	Hungary	Budapest	classical and Shinbukan katas	Shinbukan
Europe	Hungary	Gödöllő	classical and Shinbukan katas	Shinbukan
Europe	Hungary	Pécs	classical and Shinbukan katas	Shinbukan
Europe	Hungary	Kecskemét	Naganuma curriculum	Shinbukai - Tokyo
Europe	Italy	Turin	Hōjō, Tō	Namiki Yasushi via Hideki Hosokawa
Europe	Italy	Imperia	Hōjō	Namiki Yasushi via Hideki Hosokawa
Europe	Italy	La Spezia	Hōjō	Namiki Yasushi via Hideki Hosokawa
Europe	(North Macedonia) Macedonia	Skopje	Hōjō	Namiki Yasushi via Masatomi Ikeda
Europe	Netherlands	Utrecht	Hōjō, Tō	Namiki Yasushi via Masatomi Ikeda
Europe	Netherlands	Amsterdam	Hōjō	Namiki Yasushi via Hideki Hosokawa
Europe	Serbia	Beograd	Hōjō	Namiki Yasushi via Masatomi Ikeda
Europe	Serbia	Novi Sad	Hōjō	Namiki Yasushi via Masatomi Ikeda
Europe	Serbia	Vršac	Hōjō	Namiki Yasushi via Masatomi Ikeda
Europe	Serbia	Niš	Hōjō	Namiki Yasushi via Masatomi Ikeda
Europe	Slovakia	Sereď	classical and Shinbukan katas	Shinbukan
Europe	Slovakia	Bratislava	Hōjō	Namiki Yasush via Masatomi Ikeda
Europe	Switzerland	Aarau	Hōjō	Namiki Yasushi via Masatomi Ikeda
Europe	Switzerland	Basel	Hōjō	Namiki Yasushi via Masatomi Ikeda
Europe	Switzerland	La Chaux-de-Fonds	Hōjō	Namiki Yasushi via Masatomi Ikeda
Europe	Switzerland	Neuchâtel	Hōjō, Tō	Namiki Yasushi via Masatomi Ikeda
Europe	Switzerland	Zürich	Hōjō	Namiki Yasushi via Masatomi Ikeda
Europe	Switzerland	Winterthur	Hōjō	Namiki Yasushi via Masatomi Ikeda
Europe	Poland	Gryfice	classical and Shinbukan katas	Shinbukan
Europe	Poland	Toruń	classical and Shinbukan katas	Shinbukan
North America	(United States) USA	Rockville, Maryland	classical	Namiki Yasushi
North America	(United States) USA	Chicago, Illinois	Hōjō	Ōmori Sōgen
Central Pacific	(United States) USA	Honolulu, Hawaii	Hōjō	Ōmori Sōgen
continent	country	city	kata	lineage

== See also ==
- Japanese martial arts terms
- Kobudō
