= Bamboo Blade =

Japanese manga series and its adaptations

- Cover of Bamboo Blade, volume 1 as published by Square Enix
- Manga
- Written by: Masahiro Totsuka
- Illustrated by: Aguri Igarashi
- Published by: Square Enix
- English publisher: NA: Yen Press
- Magazine: Young Gangan
- English magazine: NA: Yen Plus
- Original run: December 3, 2004 – September 3, 2010
- Volumes: 14
- Manga

Bamboo Blade B
- Written by: Masahiro Totsuka
- Illustrated by: Neko Sutajio
- Published by: Square Enix
- Magazine: Monthly Shōnen Gangan
- Original run: January 10, 2009 – November 12, 2013
- Volumes: 12
- Manga

Bamboo Blade C
- Written by: Masahiro Totsuka
- Illustrated by: Jingu Takao
- Published by: Square Enix
- Magazine: Monthly Big Gangan
- Original run: May 25, 2013 – August 25, 2016
- Volumes: 7
- Manga

BB Deformer
- Written by: Masahiro Totsuka
- Illustrated by: Saki Azumi
- Published by: Square Enix
- Magazine: Monthly Big Gangan
- Original run: October 25, 2013 – August 25, 2016
- Volumes: 2
- Anime television series
- Directed by: Hisashi Saitō
- Produced by: Tsuneo Takechi; Shigeaki Komatsu; Hiroshi Yoshida; Jiyū Ōgi; Masataka Katagiri
- Written by: Hideyuki Kurata
- Music by: Kiyohiko Senba
- Studio: AIC ASTA
- Licensed by: AUS: Madman Entertainment; NA: Crunchyroll; UK: Manga Entertainment
- Original network: TV Tokyo
- English network: US: Funimation Channel, Crunchyroll Channel
- Original run: October 2, 2007 – April 2, 2008
- Episodes: 26

Bamboo Blade (stylized as BAMBOO BLADE) is a Japanese manga series written by Masahiro Totsuka and illustrated by Aguri Igarashi. It was serialized in Square Enix's Young Gangan magazine from December 2004 to September 2010. The series tells the story of Toraji Ishida, a luckless high school Kendo instructor, who is challenged by his former upperclassman, also a kendo instructor, to a competition between their female students. The bet inspires Toraji to gather and train a team of five girls, where he meets Tamaki Kawazoe, a gifted young female kendo practitioner.

An anime adaptation by AIC A.S.T.A was broadcast in Japan between October 2007 and April 2008 on TV Tokyo. The Bamboo Blade manga has been licensed for distribution in North America by Yen Press. The anime has been licensed for distribution in North America by Funimation and began airing on their Funimation Channel on October 25, 2010.

== Characters ==
Some of the character's names are based on real professional kendo practitioners. Ishida Toraji is based on the famous kendoka Toshiya Ishida. Miyako Miyazaki is based on Masahiro Miyazaki, and Danjuro Eiga is based on Naoki Eiga, Kirino Chiba is based on Masashi Chiba etc., even though there are not any relations between the Bamboo Blade characters in regards to the real kendoka. Eiga Dan is the only exception, as he seems to be designed to represent Naoki Eiga, who also is not very tall, just like Eiga.

== Media ==
=== Manga ===
Written by Mashiro Totsuka and illustrated by Aguri Igarashi, Bamboo Blade began serialization in Gangan Comic's seinen manga magazine supplement Young Gangan on December 3, 2004. The series finished on September 3, 2010. Its chapters were collected in fourteen tankōbon volumes.

Bamboo Blade was published in English by Yen Press from May 12, 2009, to August 21, 2012, and digitally on April 22, 2014.

=== Anime episodes ===
No.	Official English title Original Japanese title	Original release date
1	"A Bamboo Broom and a Champion of Justice" "Takebōki to Seigi no Mikata" (Japanese: 竹ぼうきと正義の味方)	October 2, 2007
Toraji "Kojirō" Ishida, the coach of the Muroe High kendo club, makes a bet with his senpai, Kenzaburō Ishibashi, the coach of the Machido High kendo club, on a practice match between both schools, but the fighters must be five girls, no boys. Toraji's victory would mean he could eat all he wants at Ishibashi's father's sushi restaurant for a full year. Toraji desperately needs to find more talented female kendo students because he only has the team captain in his club, Kirino Chiba. With only a month remaining before his team's match with Ishibashi's team, he meets an extremely talented freshman, Tamaki Kawazoe.
2	"The Blade Bravers and Boxed Lunch" "Burēdo Bureibā to Obentō" (Japanese: ブレードブレイバーとお弁当)	October 9, 2007
Tamaki's motivation is presented in the form of her TV superhero, Blade Braver. Miyako Miyazaki, Yūji Nakata, Danjūrō Eiga join the club. Tamaki's relationship with the other club members develop when they start having lunch together and sharing their boxed lunches. Her everyday boxed lunch, however, consisted of a single umeboshi and rice, which she constantly made in honor of her parents, and couldn't share with the others. She start making "shareable" boxed lunches at the end of the episode, even though she feels she's disrespecting her parents a little.
3	"Black and Blue" "Burakku to Burū" (Japanese: ブラックとブルー)	October 16, 2007
The club members go shopping for protective gear. After trying on their protective gear, Kojirō nicknames Tamaki "Red", the leader of the kendo club's female team, Kirino is nicknamed "Yellow", and Miyako is nicknamed "Pink". The fourth female member of the kendo club, Sayako Kuwahara nicknamed "Blue", is revealed, and has a painful first encounter with Miyako's "Black" personality. Kojirō will nickname the last female club member "Green".
4	"Pink and Blue" "Pinku to Burū" (Japanese: ピンクとブルー)	October 23, 2007
Miyako learns that the girl she had thrown in the lake the previous day was actually her senpai in the club, this leads her, in her "Pink" personality (different from her "Black" personality), to awkwardly try to hide her identity from Sayako to avoid any confrontations. She starts to enjoy more of the club's activities, even though being forced to train from early in the morning, because of the opportunities kendo give to harm others legally. She is eventually convinced by Toraji to apologize and befriends Sayako.
5	"Muroe High and Machido High" "Muroe Kō to Machido Kō" (Japanese: 室江高と町戸高)	October 30, 2007
The day of the match arrives, however, due to the unique personalities of its members, the Machido High kendo club is awfully delayed. The real match starts very late in the episode, and the episode ends with the Machido High club members awed by Tamaki's ability, after scoring a point in the first battle.
6	"Tamaki Kawazoe and the Tardy Braver" "Kawazoe Tamaki to Chikoku no Bureiba" (Japanese: 川添珠姫と遅刻の武礼葉)	November 6, 2007
After Tamaki's match, which ended in a victory for her, the other matches take place while she prepares to participate in the last match too. At the end, the Muroe High kendo club ends winning with three wins, one loss, and one tie against the Machido High kendo club. Therefore, Ishibashi challenges Tamaki to a match, impressed of how a girl of her age with such a great talent is in a kendo club like that.
7	"Sushi and Mince Meat Cutlets" "Sushi to Menchikatsu" (Japanese: 寿司とメンチカツ)	November 13, 2007
This episode picks up at the end of the previous one, starting with Ishibashi revealing that he knew the fifth fighter, Bureiba, was actually Tamaki. His challenge to Tamaki is accepted and so their match starts. Ishibashi goes all out on Tamaki, and they both score a point, but in the third round, Ishibashi starts out in upper-level posture, rather than the normal middle-level posture. This forces Tamaki to have a flashback of her mother in the same position. Ishibashi leaves the match as a tie, and then goes out to a sushi dinner with Toraji. However, this is when Toraji finds out that Ishibashi's father has given his restaurant away, making their bet void.
8	"Tama and Part-time Work" "Tama-chan to Arubaito" (Japanese: タマちゃんとアルバイト)	November 20, 2007
Tamaki sees an anime package on TV that she wants, but later finds out that she does not have enough money for it. At the kendo dojo, Tamaki overhears Miyako on the phone talking about how she could not work part-time that day. Tamaki approaches her and inquires about it. Miyako then asks Tamaki to work part time there, to which Tamaki agrees to. Tamaki's father at first disagrees with Tamaki getting a job, mostly because the school does not allow students to work part time jobs, but then accepts because he thinks that Tamaki is growing up, and also thinks she will use the money to buy him a gift for his upcoming birthday.
9	"Kojiro and the Crossroads of Fate" "Kojirō to Unmei no Bunkiten" (Japanese: コジローと運命の分岐点)	November 27, 2007
Tamaki nears the end of her part time-job filling in for Miyako, while the other club member are practicing at the kendo dojo. Tamaki's father still ponders if Tamaki will buy him a gift for his birthday. Toraji has bad luck when he goes shopping for food. He encounters a woman, also shopping for food, who causes him to lose his temper. This leads to him to the possibility of being unemployed at the kendo dojo. The only way to prevent unemployment is to improve the skills of the kendo club members and compete in the upcoming tournament. At Tamaki last time at her part-job, a mysterious customer arrives.
10	"Miyako Miyazaki's Melancholy and the First Tournament" "Miyazaki Miyako no Yūutsu to Hajitaikai" (Japanese: 宮崎都の憂鬱と初大会)	December 4, 2007
Toraji meets with his parents, and helps his mom working at a store. He receives his paycheck. Tamaki finishes up her job and receives her paycheck as well. The Muroe High kendo club enters the high school tournament. Only Tamaki did well enough to win. Miyako meets her middle school classmate, Reimi Otajima, who has a crush on her. Reimi is the customer that Tamaki met. Miyako as such became troubled and couldn't concentrate on her match. It was revealed that Reimi used to harass Miyako when they were in middle school. The episode ends off with Toraji discussing about a fifth member with Kirino.
11	"Animation and Dreams" "Animēshon to Dorīmu" (Japanese: アニメーションとドリーム)	December 11, 2007
Miyako reveals to the other kendo club members that Reimi has been harassing her because during middle school she refused to go out with the captain of the men's football team, whom Reimi had already been rejected by. Try as she might, Kirino is unable to remember the name of the potential fifth female member who's studying at Muroe High School. Yūji suggests that Kirino should call her friend up and ask for her name again, which she does. Armed with the name Satori Azuma, Kirino and Sayako begin to search for her.
12	"Azuma's Circumstances and Mei's Circumstances" "Azuma no Jijō to Mei no Jijō" (Japanese: 東の事情とメイの事情)	December 18, 2007
This episode dedicates to Satori Azuma from Muroe High School and Mei Ogawa from Seimei High School. Mei joined the Seimei High kendo club to get along with her friends, but many of her friends quit the club as they couldn't take the teacher's strict training. They gear up for the practice match with the Muroe High kendo club. However, she had set her mind to quit after the practice match. Toraji found out that Azuma didn't want to join the kendo club as her results in examinations were bad. Not because she wasn't able to do it, but she made careless mistakes. Nevertheless, Kirino drags her to the practice match. The episode concludes with the Muroe High kendo club training against the Seimei High kendo club.
13	"Teachers and Students" "Senseitachi to Seitotachi" (Japanese: 先生たちと生徒たち)	December 25, 2007
The Muroe High kendo club won all their matches against the Seimei High kendo club in the practice match. Azuma, upon seeing Tamaki's strong kendo skills become motivated and took part in the practice match. Before that, Tamaki had a match with Azuma. Despite Azuma losing, she was impressed and therefore became motivated. Mei, from Seimei High School, who originally wanted to quit, decided to stay on, as she was impressed by Tamaki's skills. The episode end off when Tadaaki Hayashi, the Seimei High kendo club's teacher, competed with Toraji, the Muroe High kendo club's teacher, having Hayashi winning the match.
14	"Satorin's Resolve and Nomming" "Satorin no Ketsui to Mogyumogyu" (Japanese: さとりんの決意ともぎゅもぎゅ)	January 9, 2008
Kirino and Sayako continue their attempts to persuade Azuma to join the kendo club. Their attempts end only in tears. As they run through and around the school, Miyako hears their mobile lamentation and springs into action. She offers an excuse that she has cleaning duties, then sweetly dumps said duties onto her classmates. Alternating between a good friend, salesperson and snake cornering a frog she attempts to win over Azuma. Miyako's tactics eventually convince Azuma (and later her parents) to join the kendo club with the expectation/condition that it will lead to improved grades. With the kendo club set with five girls, while Yūji and Eiga are excluded from participation, a training camp is announced. Due to a lack of funds, this intensive training will take place on the school grounds. Tamaki's father is perturbed especially when Tamaki confirms Yūji will be there.
15	"First Training Camp and First Public Bath" "Hatsugasshuku to Hatsusentō" (Japanese: 初合宿と初銭湯)	January 16, 2008
It's training camp at the Muroe High kendo club, jointly with the Machido High kendo club that they had a practice match with. Tamaki's father sneaks around worried about the boys while the group cleans up the pool, fights over who gets to train with Tamaki, and takes a break at the bathhouse. After that, they have to deal with one of them sneaking away, pillow fights, Sayako's guitar, and even getting freaked out by the sleeping habits of their fellow students. The episode wraps up with Tama and Kirino, the latter who can't help but stay up and hold her bamboo sword a bit longer. Camp ends and everyone returns home, but for Kirino, something more than a warm welcome awaits.
16	"Kirino's Absence and the Preliminary Tournament" "Kirino no Kesseki to Yosen Taikai" (Japanese: キリノの欠席と予選大会)	January 23, 2008
The Muroe High kendo club faces against the Tozyo High kendo club. Kirino is worried by home troubles while the rest of the team worries about her, however. Sayako, sharing a deep connection with Kirino, is prepared to step up for the win and ease Kirino's burden. Despite these troubles, however, Kirino seems even more focused than ever, gaining her a win in her match against her opponent. Meanwhile, Tamaki is pulled into a deceitful web by a few girls from the Tozyo High kendo club.
17	"Light and Shadow" "Hikari to Kage" (Japanese: 光と陰)	January 30, 2008
The tournament continues, with Tamaki seemingly in trouble with the other team's treacherous plots. Konishi, a girl from the Tozyo High kendo club, purposely causes Tamaki to trip over tennis balls, inflicting an injury on her foot. Meanwhile, Azuma encounters a little bit of stomach troubles, ending her match in a tie, and Miyako is continuously haunted by Reimi's face, ending her match in a loss. Sayako does her duty to relieve Kirino's burden, and Kirino does her part as the team's captain. When Tamaki steps up, she has a little payback in store for Konishi.
18	"The Tournament and Muroe High After That" "Taikai to Sonogo no Muroe Kou" (Japanese: 大会とその後の室江高)	February 6, 2008
Toraji and Tamaki have a little talk and wounds are tended to. Since Tamaki and Konishi were both badly injured from their match, Kirino, from the Muroe High kendo club, and Aoki, from the Tozyo High kendo club, participate in a representative match. The tournament ends, with at a loss, due to Kirino's lack of motivation and focus caused by her mother feeling better. The Muroe High kendo club is back at the kendo dojo as usual, with Sayako off somewhere and Tamaki all right.
19	"The Armadillo and the Pangolin" "Arumajiro to Senzankou" (Japanese: アルマジロとセンザンコウ)	February 13, 2008
Toraji takes Tamaki to the hospital while the other members of the Muroe High kendo club practice matches with each other. However, Miyako's sword breaks, so Miyako and Eiga go shopping for a new bamboo sword at the kendo store. Tamaki meets Ishibashi at the hospital, while Miyako and Eiga meet Carrie Nishikawa, an expatriate living in Japan, who falls in love with Eiga at first sight. Ishibashi, taking Tamaki back to her house, tells her she must understand what it is like to lose a match. At the kendo store, Miyako challenges Carrie to a kendo match at the kendo dojo. Miyako notices that Carrie uses a double-sword technique, giving Carrie an advantage. Miyako loses the match, expectedly. As Carrie departs, she informs Miyako that she will return again.
20	"Braver and Shinaider" "BUREIBAA to SHINAIDAA" (Japanese: ブレイバーとシナイダー)	February 20, 2008
Toraji gives the Muroe High kendo club a vacation, since he has a business trip to schedule. Yūji invites Tamaki to go to an amusement park that's hosting a Blade Braver play. At the venue, She meets a girl called Rin Suzuki, a fan of Braver's rival, Shinaider. They enter a quiz game show to win The Blade Bravers plush dolls. Unfortunately, Rin wins the plush dolls, in a tie-breaker round. However, Rin gives up all the plush dolls, except the Shinaider plush doll, to Tamaki.
21	"Tamaki Kawazoe and Rin Suzuki" "Kawazoe Tamaki to Suzuki Rin" (Japanese: 川 添珠姫と鈴木凛)	February 27, 2008
Tamaki and Rin witness a scene for the Blade Bravers movie. They stay up late comparing whether Blade Braver or Shinaider is the better character. In the morning Tamaki and Rin, along with the production crew, go on location to film the new Blade Bravers movie, where an incident gets both of them the replacement roles in the new film. The rest of the Muroe High kendo club members either practice or take the day off doing what they want. The episode concludes with Toraji returning from his business trip.
22	"Winners and Losers" "Haisha to Shousha" (Japanese: 敗者と勝者)	March 5, 2008
The Muroe High kendo club goes to the Kanto High kendo tournament. Miyako shows her improvement in practice, but fails to defeat Carrie in the tournament. The Muroe High kendo club makes it to the third round, where Tamaki is finally defeated by Rin, and Muroe is pushed out of the tournament. Meanwhile, Toyama and Iwasa, two former members of the Muroe High kendo club, are caught fighting in a video game arcade and destroying two machines.
23	"Lie and Silence" "Uso to Chinmoku" (Japanese: 嘘と沈黙)	March 12, 2008
The principal of the school tells Toraji that the Muroe High kendo club will be disbanded because of club members engaging in suspicious or risky activities. It turns to be Toyama and Iwasa's fault. They, ironically, have stopped attending Muroe High kendo club but have not turned in any resignation forms. Kirino and Sayako are distraught when Toraji reveals the news to them, and they protest the principal's decision, calling it unfair. Meanwhile, Miyako has an emotional breakdown over her failure in the competition and, surprisingly, refuses Eiga's comfort. Tamaki, also unhappy over losing the competition, quits the Muroe High kendo club, much to Kirino's dismay.
24	"The Sword and the Way" "Ken to Michi" (Japanese: 剣と道)	March 19, 2008
Kirino attempts and fails to prevent Tamaki from resigning from the Muroe High kendo club, the latter already having decided to give up. Neither she nor Miyako decide to attend the Muroe High kendo club, and nobody knows of Miyako's whereabouts. Eventually even Kirino decides not to attend, and the only members left are Azuma, Yūji, Eiga, and Sayako. Azuma manages to convince Miyako to keep up with kendo, while Sayako dissuades Kirino from quitting kendo. Yūji comforts Tamaki, telling her that losing is not as bad as she thinks, and Tamaki decides to learn upper-level posture to help improve her kendo skills. Eventually she decides to come back to kendo club, and the members are reunited.
25	"Kendo and What it Brings About" "Kendou to sore ga motarasumono" (Japanese: 剣道とそれがもたらすもの)	March 26, 2008
The Muroe High kendo club goes to a national kendo competition and meets with many of their former opponents. Miyako, having watched footage of her previous kendo match filmed by Reimi in an effort to improve her kendo skills, manages to beat Carrie, the latter of which calls the former out for a match of their own and is beaten again. Tamaki fights Rin again and wins by using the thrust attack. Toraji, on the other hand, has emptied out his apartment, and in the last few minutes of the episode is shown getting on Nobu's motorcycle and going to a different place, presumably his new home.
26	""Since Then" and "From Here on Out"" ""Sorekara" to "korekara"" (Japanese: "それから"と"これから")	April 2, 2008
It is a new year and several months have passed since the national kendo competition. Rin invites Tamaki to see the Blade Bravers movie in a movie theater. Back at the kendo dojo, two freshmen show up to join the Muroe High kendo club. The members one by one appear trying to convince them to join the club only to perform sideshow tricks leaving the freshmen unimpressed. The Muroe High kendo club later have a sparring match which causes the freshmen to become enthusiastic about joining the kendo club. It is later revealed that these two new kendo club members, Shinobu Toyama and Makoto Iwasa, are the siblings of the previous members that quit. Toraji returns to school having settled the problem with the woman, which he encountered at the store, that forced him to leave. At the very end of the episode Tamaki encounters a long purple haired woman with blue eyes, hinting that Bamboo Blade may have another season to come.

== Video game ==
A video game titled "Bamboo Blade: Sorekara no Chousen" was released for PSP. It is an Action game that was developed and published by Gadget Soft. It was released in Japan in 2009.

== Reception ==
"The recent series from anime production house AIC A.S.T.A is a surprise - and yet not really one at all," wrote Andrez Bergen in the June 2008 issue of U.K. magazine, impact. "While Bamboo Blade follows the travails of a bunch of high school girls in one very special kendo team, rather than boys, the producers were previously responsible for Gun Sword, a series in which one very special woman - Carmen 99 - also pretty much stole the show."

== See also ==
- List of Square Enix video game franchises
