= Kendo Kata =

Fixed patterns in kendo practice

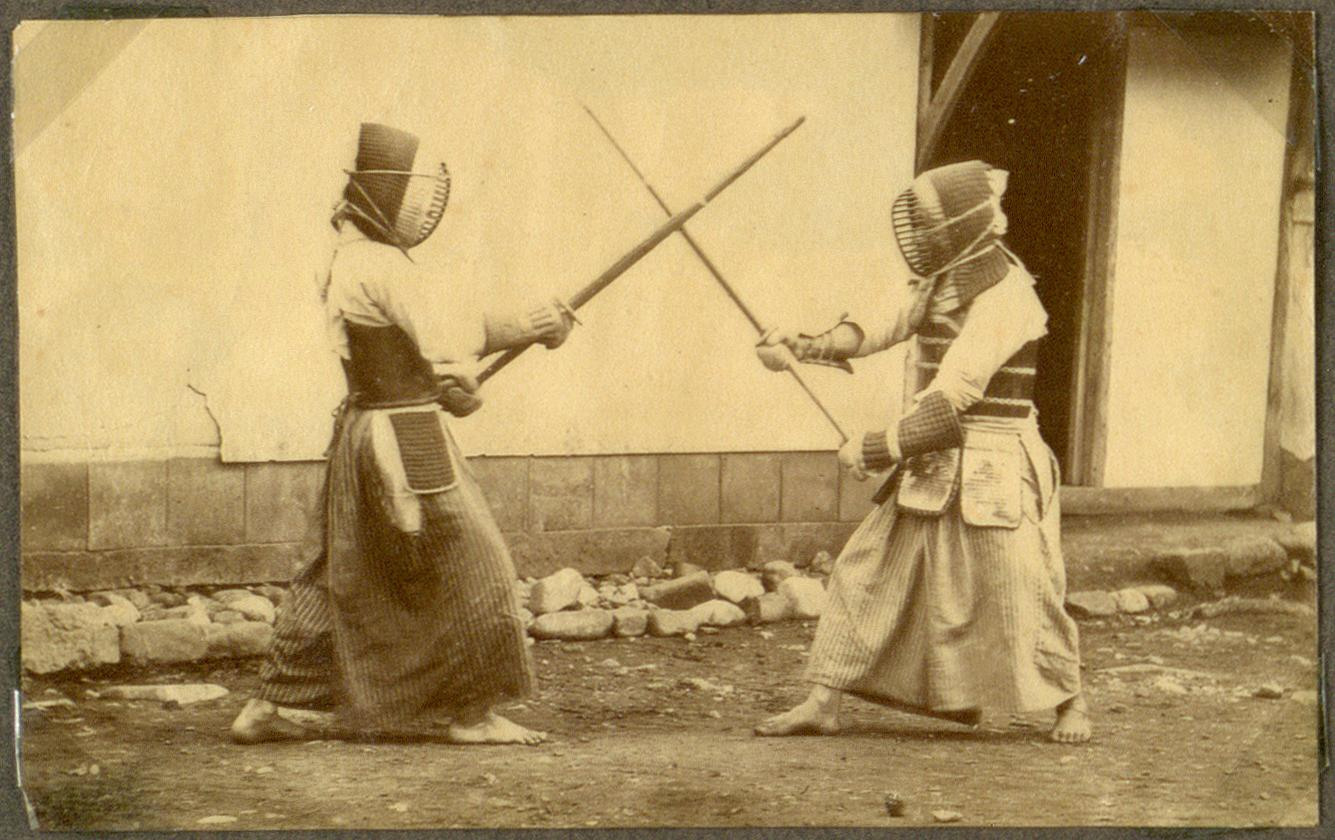
Two kendoka practicing Kata in bōgu, 1868

Kendo Kata are fixed patterns that teach kendoka (kendo practitioners) the basic elements of swordsmanship. There are two roles, uchidachi (打太刀), the teacher, and shidachi (仕太刀), the student.

== As teaching aid ==
Kata were originally used to preserve the techniques and history of kenjutsu for future generations. In the past, many ryu or schools of kendo and kenjutsu had their own set of kata that students used to learn. Kata were first unified in the Keishicho Gekken Kata or Police Department Attacking Motion Kendo Kata, when exemplary kenshi were hired to standardize kata instruction in 1880. Nihon Kendo Kata were finalized in 1912 for use in public school instruction. Modern usage of kata is as a teaching tool to learn strike techniques, attack intervals, body movement, sincerity and kigurai (pride).

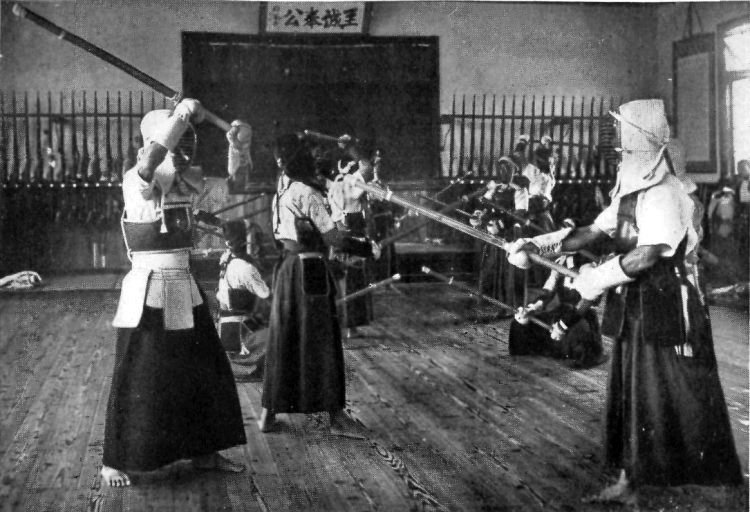
Kendo kata at an agricultural school in Japan around 1920 man in right foreground is in Chūdan-no-kamae.

== Nihon Kendo Kata ==
In kendo kata, the teacher role always moves first. Both the student and teacher use bokken (木剣), except in some demonstrations which use blunted katana. The first seven kata use tachi, a long bokken, for both student and teacher. The last three kata use tachi for the teacher and kodachi, a shorter bokken, for the student. In general, mastery of the first three kata are required for advancement to 1-Kyu and more for Dan grades.

Tachi vs. Tachi
Kata 1: Ippon-me
Kata 2: Nihon-me
Kata 3: Sanbon-me
Kata 4: Yonhon-me
Kata 5: Gohon-me
Kata 6: Roppon-me
Kata 7: Nanahon-me
Tachi vs. Kodachi
Kata 8: Ippon-me
Kata 9: Nihon-me
Kata 10: Sanbon-me

=== Criticism ===
There has been criticism of the Nihon Kendo Kata by kendoka due to continued usage of outdated forms. For example, kodachi are no longer used except when wielding two swords. This led to the development of Bokuto Ni Yoru Kendo Kihon-waza Keiko-ho.

== Bokuto Ni Yoru Kendo Kihon-waza Keiko-ho ==
Bokuto Ni Yoru Kendo Kihon-waza Keiko-ho is a new form of bokken training that is directly translatable to bogu kendo. Bokuto Ni Yoru Kendo Kihon-waza Keiko-ho also facilitates learning the Nihon Kendo Kata, and because of this was adopted by the All Japan Kendo Federation for use in primary and secondary school. While Nihon Kendo Kata uses all five kamae, Bokuto Ni Yoru Kendo Kihon-waza Keiko-ho uses only Chūdan-no-kamae, the most common stance. Instead of student and teacher roles, there are the equal roles of Motodachi and Kakarite. The Motodachi receives the waza of the Kakarite. The first four waza are focused on attack initiation techniques, while the final five are focused on techniques for responding to an attack.

Name and Technique	Strikes Used
Kihon 1: Ippon-uchi no waza	Men, Kote, Dō, Tsuki
Kihon 2: Renzoku no waza	Kote, Men
Kihon 3: Harai waza	Harai Men
Kihon 4: Hiki waza	Tsubazeriai kara no Hiki Doh
Kihon 5: Nuki waza	Men, Nuki Doh
Kihon 6: Suriage waza	Kote, Suriage Men
Kihon 7: Debana waza	Debana kote
Kihon 8: Kaeshi waza	Men, Kaeshi Migi-Doh
Kihon 9: Uchiotoshi waza	Doh uchiotoshi Men
