= Maai =

Japanese martial arts term

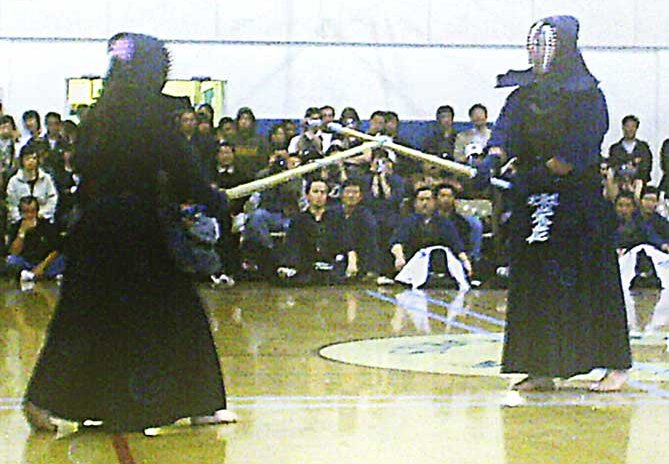
- Brandon Harada (Sho-Tokyo Dojo) in transition from Itto-ma to Chikama against Eiga Naoki in chūdan-no-kamae (on the right). Demonstration at Mori Hai Memorial Tournament, Jan 29, 2006, Norwalk, California.

Japanese name
- Kanji: 間合い
- Hiragana: まあい
Transcriptions
- Revised Hepburn: maai

Maai (間合い), translating simply to "interval", is a Japanese martial arts term referring to the space between two opponents in combat; formally, the "engagement distance".

The concept of maai incorporates not just the distance between opponents, but also the time taken to cross the distance and the angle and rhythm of attack; collectively, these all factor in to the exact position from which one opponent can strike the other. For example, a faster opponent's maai is further away than a slower opponent.

It is ideal for one opponent to maintain maai while preventing the other from doing so, meaning that they can strike before the opponent can, rather than both striking simultaneously, or being struck without the ability to strike back.

== Types ==
In kendo, maai has a more specific interpretation. In physical terms, it pertains to the distance maintained between two opponents. When maai is interpreted as the actual distance between opponents, there are three types:

1. Tōma (Tō-ma) — long distance
2. Issoku ittō-no-maai (Itto-ma) — one-foot-one-sword distance, also called chūma (middle distance)
3. Chikama — short distance

Itto-ma is the distance equaling a single step to make one strike. It measures about two metres between opponents and either one of them only needs to advance a single step in order to strike the other. Normally, most techniques are initiated at this distance. Chika-ma is the distance narrower than Itto-ma (short/close distance), and Tō-ma is greater (long/far distance). At Tō-ma, there is a small margin of time to allow for a reaction to be made against an opponent's attack. However, at Issoku itto-no-ma, there exists almost no margin at all, so that at this distance one's attention must remain constantly alert and unbroken.

== Timing ==
In terms of time, maai pertains to the momentary lapses of awareness that are manifested in the opponent's mind. Extended further, it also embraces the concept of Kyo-jitsu (emptiness-fullness of Ki). These momentary lapses of mind, and Kyo-jitsu, are known as the kokoro-no-maai (mental interval). The implication of kokoro-no-maai is that although the physical distance between opponents may be mutually advantageous, the mental interval possessed by individuals will determine who will have the decisive advantage.
