= Otani Nobutomo =

Japanese martial artist (1798–1864)

Otani Nobutomo (a.k.a. Otani Shimosa no Kami Seiichiro, Otani Shintaro; 1798–1864) was a Japanese martial artist. He was adopted into the Otani family by Otani Hikoshiro in 1817. A master of the Kashima Shinden Jikishinkage-ryū of kenjutsu, he also studied Hōzōin-ryū sōjutsu and the kyūjutsu of the Yoshida-ryu. At the age of 57, Otani was appointed as a commissioner of the Kōbusho military academy.

Otani was well-regarded for his decorous behaviour in challenge matches, earning the nickname Kunshi no ken, the Gentleman's Sword. He was known to allow opponents to score hits against him on purpose. He would often engage in multiple matches against challengers, allowing himself to be defeated in the first engagement so as to gauge his opponent's response to an easy victory. A repeat match would then see Otani trounce the challenger with ease. This tactic worked to great effect in securing the discipleship of Shimada Toranosuke, who would become one of Otani's most noted students. He also taught Sakakibara Kenkichi.
