= Sakakibara Kenkichi =

Japanese martial artist (1830–1894)

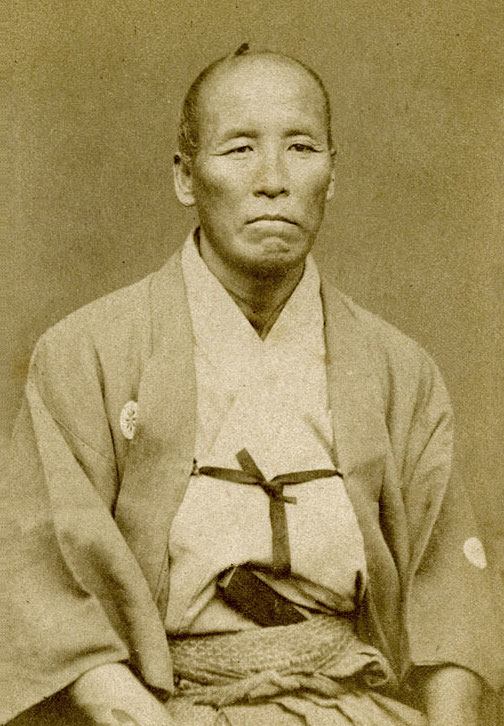
- Born: Sakakibara Tomoyoshi; December 19, 1830
- Died: November 9, 1894 (aged 63)
- Native name: 榊原鍵吉
- Nationality: Japanese
- Teacher: Otani Nobutomo

Other information
- Notable students: Matsuoka Katsunosuke, Jirokichi Yamada, Naitō Takaharu, Takeda Sokaku
- Notable school: Kashima Shinden Jikishinkage-ryū

Sakakibara Kenkichi (Japanese: 榊原鍵吉; December 19, 1830 – September 11, 1894) was a Japanese samurai and martial artist. He was the fourteenth headmaster of the Jikishinkage school of sword fighting. Through his Jikishinkage contacts he rose to a position of some political influence; he taught swordsmanship at a government military academy and also served in the personal guard of Japan's last two shōguns.

After the fall of the Tokugawa shogunate Sakakibara was instrumental in preserving traditional Japanese sword techniques in the early Meiji Era. Despite his eventual opposition to the practice of sword fighting for sport, his work during this period laid the foundations for the modern sport of kendo. In his later years he taught a number of noted martial artists, and was honoured by the All Japan Kendo Federation after his death.

== Early life ==
Sakakibara was born on the fifth day of the eleventh month of Bunsei (December 19, 1830) into the Sakakibara clan; his given name at birth was Tomoyoshi (友善). His family lived in the village of Otsuwa near modern-day Tokyo. He started studying Kashima Shinden Jikishinkage-ryū with Otani Nobutomo in 1843. He proved proficient in that style, and was granted a menkyo kaiden (licence of mastery) by Otani in 1856, despite his family being too poor to pay for it. He was later to become the fourteenth headmaster of the school. As a talented swordsman, he once duelled with Yamaoka Tesshū; the two men faced off for over forty minutes without moving, before sheathing their swords with neither striking a blow.

== Edo period ==
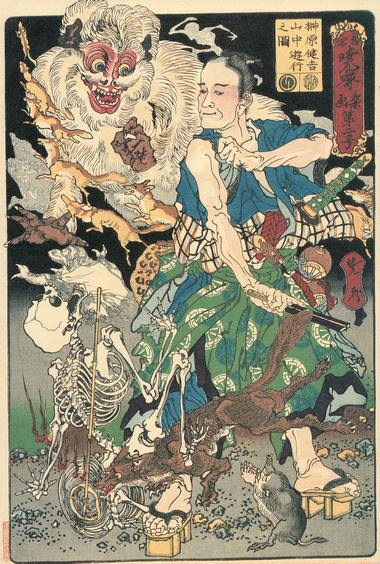
Sakakibara Kenkichi wandering in the mountains, Kawanabe Kyōsai, c. 1874

In 1856 Sakakibara was appointed as a professor at the Kōbusho (講武所), a shogunate-sponsored military academy. He received this post through the auspices of his teacher Otani, who had himself been granted a teaching position there. In this role, Sakakibara was noticed by the shōgun Tokugawa Iemochi, who appointed Sakakibara as his bodyguard and fencing instructor. He also married Taka, the daughter of the shōgun's personal retainer Iwajiro Mihashi. In order that his headmastery of the Jikishinkage-ryū would not interfere with his duties to the shōgun, his student Matsuoka Katsunosuke was temporarily placed in charge of the school.

By 1863, Sakakibara was a head keeper at Edo Castle and received a stipend of 300 ryō per year. He resigned from this post in 1866, after Iemochi's death and started a dojo in Kurumazaka (a neighbourhood of Edo, now part of modern Ueno).

== Meiji period ==
Despite his connections to the shogunate, at the Battle of Ueno in 1868 Sakakibara did not participate in the fighting between the pro-shogunate and Imperial forces, considering it to be his duty to guard the Kan'ei-ji temple. He did, in fact, rescue the Imperial Prince Kitashirakawa Yoshihisa (who was at the time the abbot of Kan'ei-ji) from the Shōgitai, physically carrying him away from the combat. Sakakibara subsequently returned to the service of the Tokugawa family as Captain of the Guard under Tokugawa Iesato, whom he served until 1870. After the Meiji Restoration Sakakibara was offered a position with the Tokyo Metropolitan Police Department, which he refused out of loyalty to Iemochi. He was, however, part of the group of fencers who created the forms for the Keishichō-ryū (警視庁流), the style of sword fighting created in 1868 for use by the police, and he worked briefly as a prison guard at the police headquarters.

The new Meiji Government had banned the carrying of swords and in 1876 banned the practice of duelling, and so traditional swordsmanship was no longer popular. Sakakibara tried to find new ways of promoting kenjutsu. His motives may have been financial, as without a sponsor he, like many other martial artists of the era, was suffering from penury – his poverty was such that he had to accept help from his wife's uncle Katsu Kaishū in constructing a residence. He began organising gekiken kogyo (撃剣興行; "sword combat performances"), feeling that such public competitions would instil an appreciation for the art of the swordsman in their audiences. He started an organisation called the Gekken Kaisha (撃剣会社; "Fencing Society"), which, inspired by the popularity of sumo wrestling, organised these contests. The first public kogyo organised by Sakakibara's group took place in April 1873, and lasted for over a week. Other martial artists, witnessing the success of the Gekken Kaisha, followed suit, resulting in new forms such as Kenshibu (剣詩舞), the Japanese art of sword dancing

As part of his public performances Sakakibara occasionally demonstrated a tameshigiri technique called kabuto wari (兜割り; "helmet breaking"), which involved slicing through a steel helmet with a single stroke of the sword. In 1887 he performed this before the Emperor Meiji, as part of a demonstration organised by one of the Emperor's relatives. Of the three sword masters present who attempted this cut, Sakakibara was the only one to succeed in cutting the helmet, despite the fact that he had been unable to make the cut in practice attempts.

Despite the success of the gekiken kogyo performances, in his later years Sakakibara regretted their development. In his view, the rules and strictures of gekiken were perverting kenjutsu into new forms that were no longer relevant to battlefield combat. He disdained the point-scoring swordsmanship of other kendoka of his era, ignoring light touches by his opponents in order to deliver his own powerful strikes. Nonetheless, the gekiken kogyo practices which he began created an interest in fencing which led ultimately to the development of modern kendo.

== Later life ==
In his later years Sakakibara returned to coach and train in his dojo in Kurumazaka, after trying his hand unsuccessfully at running a kōdan (講談; "storytelling") theatre and an izakaya (居酒屋) (bar). Those who trained at the Kurumazaka dojo included Naitō Takaharu, who was to become head of the Dai Nippon Butoku Kai, and foreigners such as Austrian ambassador and fencing expert Heinrich von Siebold, and German Erwin Bälz, physician to the Japanese Imperial Family. Takeda Sōkaku, the founder of Daitō-ryū Aiki-jūjutsu, also studied with Sakakibara at Kurumazaka.

On New Year's Day of 1894, Sakakibara passed on the Jikishinkage headmastership to his disciple Jirokichi Yamada. Sakakibara died of heart failure due to beriberi on September 11 the same year, at the age of 63. He was entombed at Saiō-ji temple Yotsuya, Tokyo and given the posthumous Buddhist name Gikōin Jōzan Yamatoō Koji (義光院杖山倭翁居士). In 2003 he was inducted into the All Japan Kendo Federation's Kendo Hall of Fame (剣道殿堂).
