= Toranosuke =

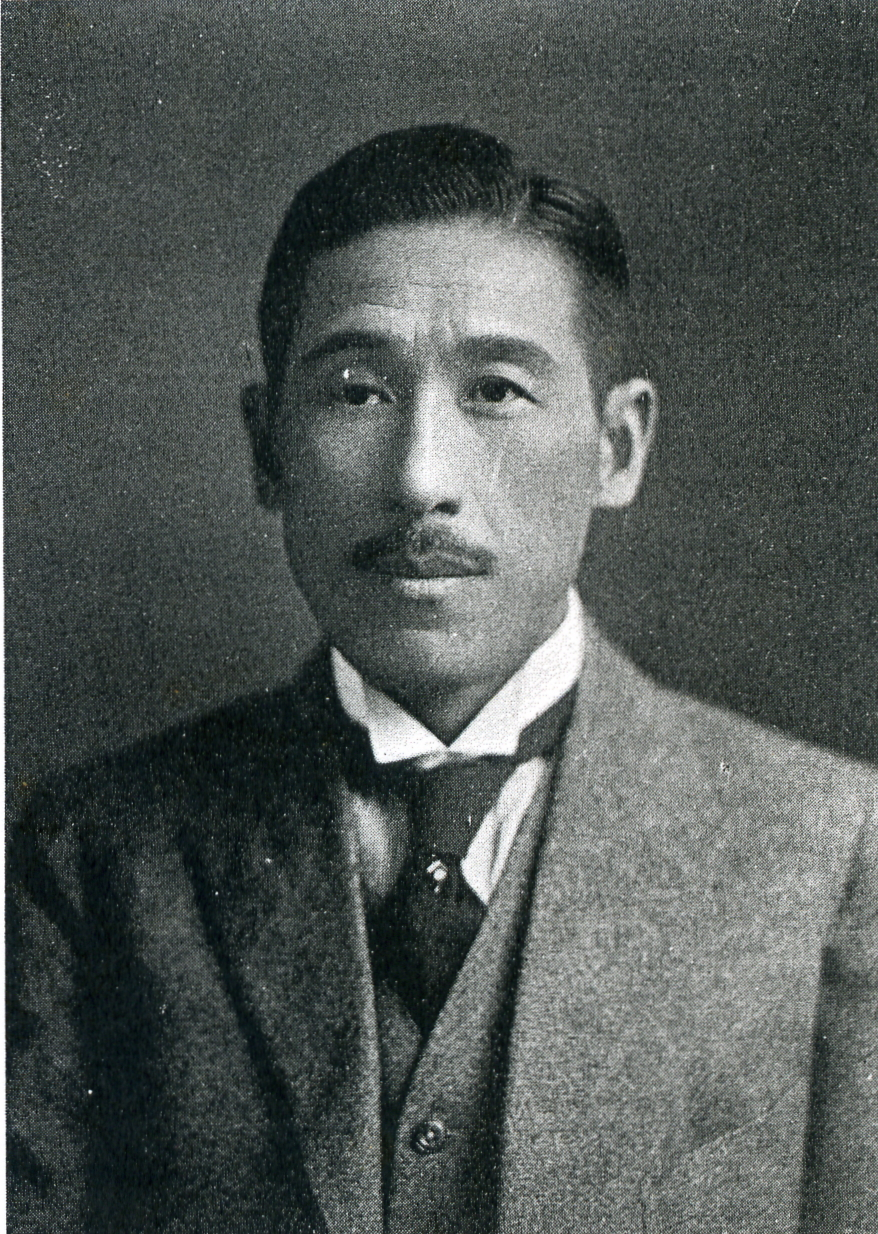
- Toranosuke Murata (1877–1945), Japanese politician
- Pronunciation: toɾanosɯke (IPA)
- Gender: Male

Origin
- Origin: Japanese
- Meaning: Different meanings depending on the kanji used

Toranosuke is a masculine Japanese given name.

== Written forms ==
Toranosuke can be written using many different combinations of kanji characters. Some examples:

- 虎之介, "tiger, of, mediate"
- 虎之助, "tiger, of, help"
- 虎之輔, "tiger, of, help"
- 虎之丞, "tiger, of, help"
- 寅之介, "sign of the tiger (Chinese zodiac), of, mediate"
- 寅之助, "sign of the tiger (Chinese zodiac), of, help"
- 寅之輔, "sign of the tiger (Chinese zodiac), of, help"
- 寅之丞, "sign of the tiger (Chinese zodiac), of, help"

The name can also be written in hiragana とらのすけ or katakana トラノスケ.

== Notable people with the name ==
- Toranosuke Katayama (片山 虎之助; 1935–2025), Japanese politician
- Toranosuke Murata (村田 虎之助; 1877–1945), Japanese politician
- Toranosuke Nakagawa (中川 虎之助; 1542–1583), childhood name of Nakagawa Kiyohide, Japanese daimyō
- Toranosuke Shimada (島田 虎之助; 1810–1864), Japanese samurai
- Toranosuke Sugi (杉 寅之助; 1830–1859), childhood name of Yoshida Shōin, Japanese scholar
- Toranosuke Takagi (高木 虎之介; born 1974), Japanese racing driver
- Toranosuke Takeshita (竹下 虎之助; 1924–2008), Japanese politician

== Fictional characters ==
- Toranosuke Taiga (大河 虎之介), a character in the tokusatsu series Hyakuju Sentai Gaoranger
