= All Japan Kendo Championship =

Sports competitions

All Japan Kendo Championships
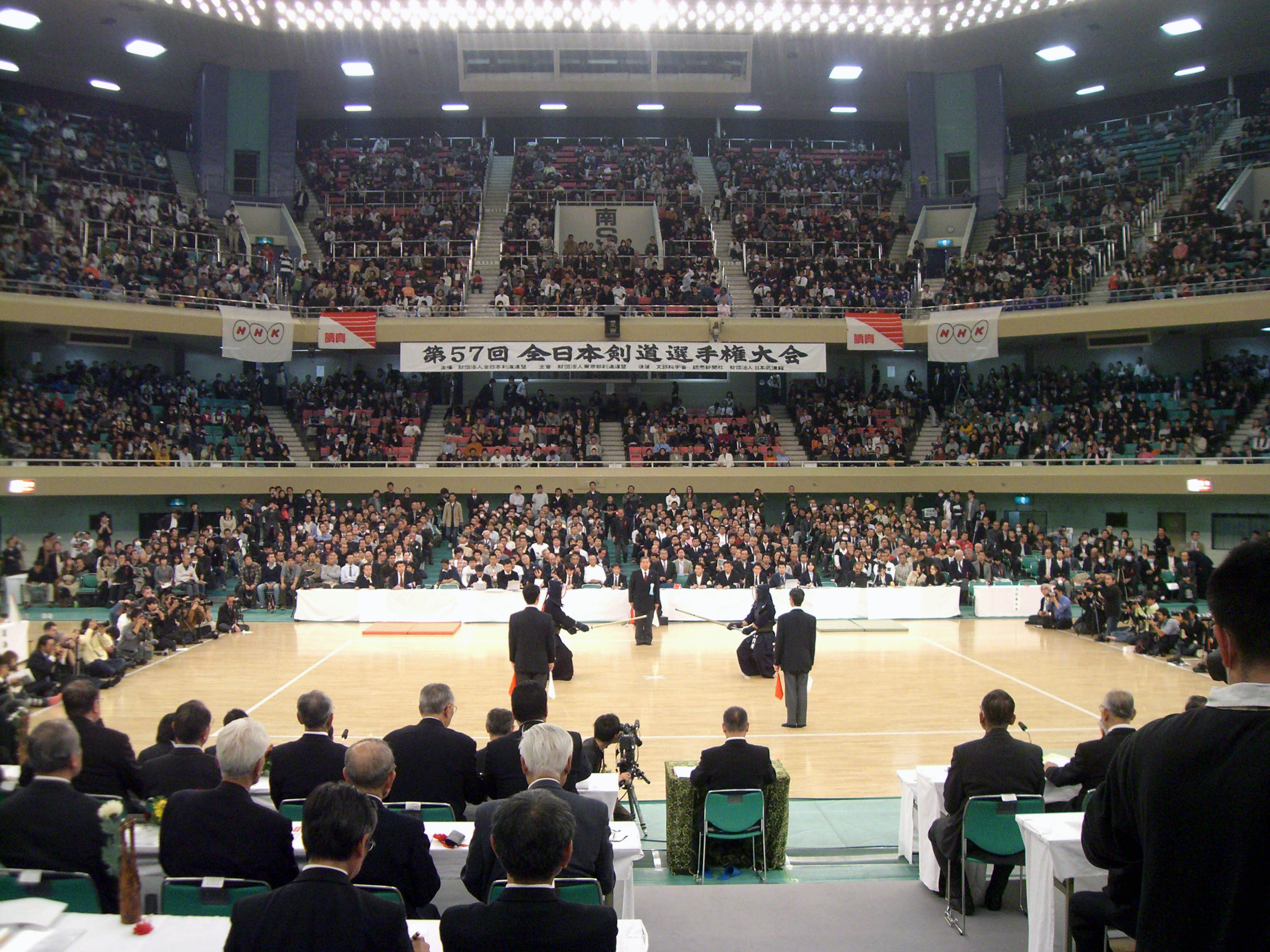
- Men's final in 2009 Takahashi (left) vs Uchimura (right)

Competition details
- Discipline: Kendo
- Type: Kendo
- Organiser: All Japan Kendo Federation

History
- First edition: 1953
- Editions: 72 (2024), at Nippon Budokan
- Most wins: Masahiro Miyazaki: 6 titles

The All Japan Kendo Championships (全日本剣道選手権大会, Zennihon kendō senshuken taikai) is a kendo tournament held every year in Japan. The men's tournament is held at Nippon Budokan on 3 November, on Culture Day.

Among Kendoka, whether Japanese or not, the tournament is considered to be the most prestigious event in this sport, even more prestigious than the World Kendo Championship.

== Overview ==
The All Japan Kendo Championship is a tournament, in which the best male Kendoka in Japan will be decided through a sudden death system. A total of 64 kendoka participate in the championship. To win the title, the competitor needs to win all of his six bouts. The competitors are not only required to show strength, but also courtesy in accordance with the martial arts spirit. The winner receives the Emperor's Cup.

== Qualification ==
The qualification are conducted on prefectural level. Each prefectural Kendo Federation of the All Japan Kendo Federation is responsible for their own qualification. The winner of each qualification tournament will be qualified for the All Japan Kendo Championship. However, in Hokkaido, Ibaraki, Kanagawa, Aichi and Hyōgo the runner up of also qualifiers, while in Chiba, Tokyo, Osaka, Saitama, Fukuoka both runner up and the third placed Kendoka are qualified for the tournament. Until the 32nd tournament in 1984, only 6th dan kendoka were allowed to qualify, before the restrictions were lowered to 5th dan at the 38th tournament in 1990. Since the 43rd tournament in 1995, there are no restrictions in age and rank.

== Winners ==
Year	Name	In Kanji	Prefecture	Profession	Age	Championships
1953	Shō Sakakibara	榊原正	Aichi	Nagoya Correctional District Legal Instructor	33	1st
1954	Yuichiro Konishi	小西雄一郎	Fukuoka	West Japan Railway employee	32	1st
1955	Taro Nakamura	中村太郎	Kanagawa	Police officer	33	1st
1956	Haruo Asagawa	浅川春男	Gifu	－	37	1st
1957	Nobutaka Morida	森田信尊	Nagasaki	Mitsubishi engineering employee	39	1st
1958	Moriji Suzuki	鈴木守治	Aichi	tax office employee	38	1st
1959	Taro Nakamura	中村太郎	Kanagawa	Police officer	37	2nd
1960	Tetsuaki Kuwahara	桑原哲明	Miyazaki	Chemist	21	1st
1961	Kiyoji Ibo	伊保清次	Tokyo	High School teacher	41	1st
1962	Tadao Toda	戸田忠男	Shiga	Chemist	23	1st
1963	Taro Yano	矢野太郎	Hyōgo	Police officer	40	1st
1964	Tadao Toda	戸田忠男	Shiga	Chemist	25	2nd
1965	Yasuhiro Nishiyama	西山泰弘	Tokyo	Police officer	29	1st
1966	Masashi Chiba	千葉仁	Tokyo	Police officer	22	1st
1967	Kunihiro Hotta	堀田国弘	Hyogo	Police officer	41	1st
1968	Shohei Yamazaki	山崎正平	Niigata	Niigata City Hall staff	45	1st
1969	Masashi Chiba	千葉仁	Tokyo	Police officer	25	2nd
1970	Takeshi Nakamura	中村毅	Tokyo	Police officer	29	1st
1971	Tetsuo Kawazoe	川添哲夫	Tokyo	Kokushikan University 4th year student	21	1st
1972	Masashi Chiba	千葉仁	Tokyo	Police officer	28	3rd
1973	Hironori Yamada	山田博徳	Kumamoto	Police officer	25	1st
1974	Eiji Yokoo	横尾英治	Wakayama	Wakayama Prefectural Board of Education staff	24	1st
1975	Tetsuo Kawazoe	川添哲夫	Kōchi	Teacher	25	2nd
1976	Kojiro Uda	右田幸次郎	Kumamoto	Teacher	23	1st
1977	Isao Ogawa	小川功	Osaka	Police officer	34	1st
1978	Masahisa Ishibashi	石橋正久	Fukuoka	Police officer	27	1st
1979	Eiji Sueno	末野栄二	Kagoshima	Police officer	30	1st
1980	Mitsutoshi Toyama	外山光利	Miyazaki	High School teacher	26	1st
1981	Yuji Nakata	中田琇士	Tokyo	Police officer	34	1st
1982	Keiichi Ishida	石田健一	Osaka	Police officer	33	1st
1983	Kazuyoshi Higashi	東一良	Aichi	Police officer	33	1st
1984	Tetsuo Harada	原田哲夫	Kyoto	Police officer	31	1st
1985	Yoshifumi Ishizuka	石塚美文	Osaka	Police officer	34	1st
1986	Yuki Iwabori	岩堀透	Osaka	Police officer	34	1st
1987	Kiyonori Nishikawa	西川清紀	Tokyo	Police officer	32	1st
1988	Akira Hayashi	林朗	Hokkaido	Hokkaido Kendo Federation secretary staff	30	1st
1989	Kiyonori Nishikawa	西川清紀	Tokyo	Police officer	34	2nd
1990	Masahiro Miyazaki	宮崎正裕	Kanagawa	Police officer	27	1st
1991	Masahiro Miyazaki	宮崎正裕	Kanagawa	Police officer	28	2nd
1992	Toshiya Ishida	石田利也	Osaka	Police officer	31	1st
1993	Masahiro Miyazaki	宮崎正裕	Kanagawa	Police officer	30	3rd
1994	Kiyonori Nishikawa	西川清紀	Tokyo	Police officer	39	3rd
1995	Toshiya Ishida	石田利也	Osaka	Police officer	34	2nd
1996	Masahiro Miyazaki	宮崎正裕	Kanagawa	Police officer	33	4th
1997	Fumihiro Miyazaki	宮崎史裕	Kanagawa	Police officer	32	1st
1998	Masahiro Miyazaki	宮崎正裕	Kanagawa	Police officer	35	5th
1999	Masahiro Miyazaki	宮崎正裕	Kanagawa	Police officer	36	6th
2000	Naoki Eiga	栄花直輝	Hokkaido	Police officer	33	1st
2001	Hidenori Iwasa	岩佐英範	Tokyo	Police officer	31	1st
2002	Kaigo Ando	安藤戒牛	Aichi	Police officer	29	1st
2003	Takumi Chikamoto	近本巧	Aichi	Police officer	32	1st
2004	Tsuyoshi Suzuki	鈴木剛	Chiba	Police officer	32	1st
2005	Satoru Harada	原田悟	Tokyo	Police officer	32	1st
2006	Ryoichi Uchimura	内村良一	Tokyo	Police officer	26	1st
2007	Shoji Teramoto	寺本将司	Osaka	Police officer	32	1st
2008	Kenji Shodai	正代賢司	Kanagawa	Police officer	27	1st
2009	Ryoichi Uchimura	内村良一	Tokyo	Police officer	29	2nd
2010	Susumu Takanabe	高鍋進	Kanagawa	Police officer	34	1st
2011	Susumu Takanabe	高鍋進	Kanagawa	Police officer	35	2nd
2012	Daiki Kiwada	木和田大起	Osaka	Police officer	34	1st
2013	Ryoichi Uchimura	内村良一	Tokyo	Police officer	33	3rd
2014	Yuya Takenouchi	竹ノ内佑也	Fukuoka	Tsukuba University 3rd year student	21	1st
2015	Hidehisa Nishimura	西村英久	Kumamoto	Police officer	26	1st
2016	Yosuke Katsumi	勝見洋介	Kanagawa	Police officer	30	1st
2017	Hidehisa Nishimura	西村英久	Kumamoto	Police officer	28	2nd
2018	Hidehisa Nishimura	西村英久	Kumamoto	Police officer	29	3rd
2019	Rentaro Kunitomo	國友鍊太朗	Fukuoka	Police officer	29	1st
2020	Not held due to the COVID-19 pandemic, postponed until 2021					
2021 (postponed 2020)	Kenshiro Matsuzaki	松崎賢士郎	Ibaraki	Tsukuba University 4th year student	22	1st
2021	Keita Hoshiko	星子啓太	Kagoshima	Unemployed	23	1st
2022	Tetsuhiko Murakami	村上哲彦	Ehime	Police officer	30	1st
2023	Ryusuke Natsumeda	棗田龍介	Hiroshima	Police officer	23	1st
2024	Yuya Takenouchi	竹ノ内佑也	Tokyo	Police officer	31	2nd
2025	Keita Hoshiko	星子啓太	Tokyo	Police officer	27	2nd
2026	Ryunosuke Nakata	中田竜之介	Tokyo	Police officer	23	1st

=== Statistics ===
==== Most wins ====
- 6 times：Masahiro Miyazaki (1990, 1991, 1993, 1996, 1998 and 1999)
- 3 times：Masashi Chiba (1966, 1969 and 1972)/ Kiyonori Nishikawa (1987, 1989 and 1994)/ Ryoichi Uchimura (2006, 2009 and 2013)/ Hidehisa Nishimura (2015, 2017 and 2018)
- 2 times：Taro Nakamura (1955, 1959) / Tadao Toda (1962, 1964)/ Tetsuo Kawazoe (1971, 1975)/ Toshiya Ishida (1992, 1995)/ Susumu Takanabe (2010, 2011) / Yuya Takenouchi (2014, 2024) / Keita Hoshiko (2021, 2025)

==== Most consecutive wins ====
- 2 consecutive times：Masahiro Miyazaki (1990–1991, 1998–1999) / Susumu Takanabe (2010–2011)/ Hidehisa Nishimura (2017–2018)

==== Competitor's professions ====
Police officers provide by far the vast majority of the competitors, followed by teachers. The competitors, who participated in the early years of the tournament were from various professions, but the police force emerged from around 1965 and began to compete with the teachers for the championship in the 1950s. From then on police officers dominate the championships and Japanese kendo at professional level. They are Kendo personnel selected as part of the tokuren, a special unit of the riot police dedicated for doing professional kendo as a profession. The largest tokuren squads fully dedicated to kendo are the Tokyo Metropolitan Police and the prefectural police departments of Osaka, Kanagawa and Hokkaido. Kendo police officers in smaller prefectural police departments may also conduct regular police work in the riot squad more often than in the latter mentioned departments due to shortage. Teachers also provide a large group among the competitors. Most of them either teach physical education at high school level of kendo. A third significant group at the championships are students. They either qualify via the All Japan University Kendo Championship or through the prefectural qualifying. The youngest winner of the championship was student Yuya Takenouchi (now kendo police officer in the Tokyo Metropolitan Police) being the first student to win the championship in after 43 years.

==== Number of championships by prefecture ====
- 19：Tokyo (13 people)
- 13：Kanagawa (6 people)
- 7：Osaka (6 people)
- 5：Aichi (5 people) / Kumamoto (3 people)

==== Youngest Champion ====
- 21 years 5 months：Yuya Takenouchi（2014・62nd）

==== Oldest Champion ====
- 45 years：Shohei Yamazaki（1968・16th）

== See also ==
- World Kendo Championship
- European Kendo Championships
