= Jirokichi =

- Gender: Male

Origin
- Origin: Japanese
- Meaning: Different meanings depending on the kanji used

Jirokichi (written: 次郎吉 or 次朗吉) is a masculine Japanese given name. Notable people with the name include:

- Nakamura Jirokichi (仲村 次郎吉; 1797–1831), better known as Nezumi Kozō, Japanese thief and folk hero.
- Jirokichi Yamada (山田 次朗吉; 1863–1930), Japanese swordsman.
