= Gedan-no-kamae =

Stance in kendo

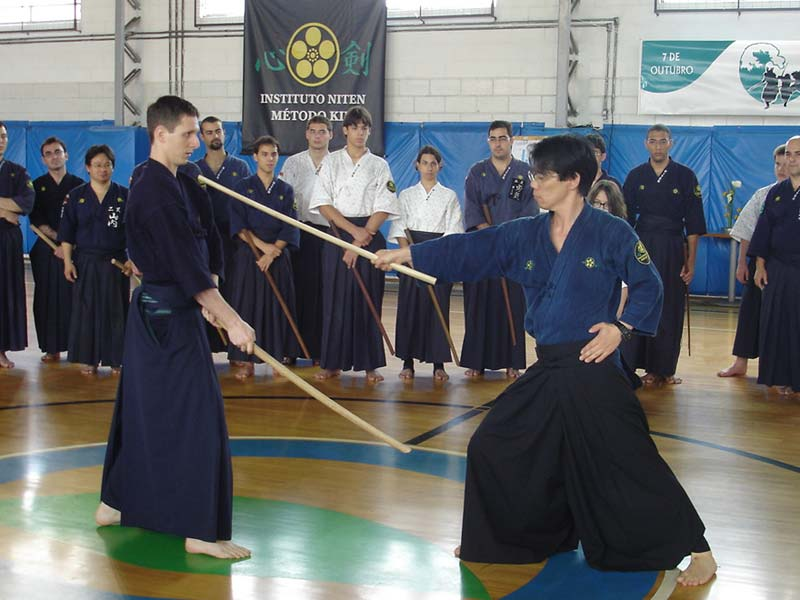
Practitioners of the Niten Ichi-ryū school of kenjutsu demonstrating a kata. The man on the left is in gedan-no-kamae.

Gedan-no-kamae (下段の構え Hiragana: げだんのかまえ), frequently shortened simply to gedan, occasionally shortened to gedan-gamae, is one of the five stances in kendo: jōdan, chūdan, gedan, hassō, and waki. Gedan-no-kamae means "lower-level posture." This position is adopted when the sword is held out in front of the body pointing at the waist in kendo, or at the knee or sometimes the ankle in kenjutsu.

It is considered a variant of chūdan-no-kamae and therefore appearing as a defensive posture, but instead it is used to deflect blows and create striking opportunities. This stance is used as a transition from chūdan-no-kamae to a tsuki (突き; thrust). It is called the Kamae of Earth (地の構え, chi-no-kamae) in Yagyū Shinkage-ryū.

== European schools of swordsmanship ==
The German school of fencing refers to this stance as alber "Fool's guard"; as it serves to bait the foolish with apparent weakness.

Gedan-no-kamae is called porta di ferro larga ('wide iron door' or 'wide iron gate') in the Italian school of swordsmanship. Iron gate refers to postures where the sword is held above the forward knee. Larga postures have the point down, while stretta (narrow) postures have a raised point.
