= Hassō-no-kamae =

Offensive stance in kendo

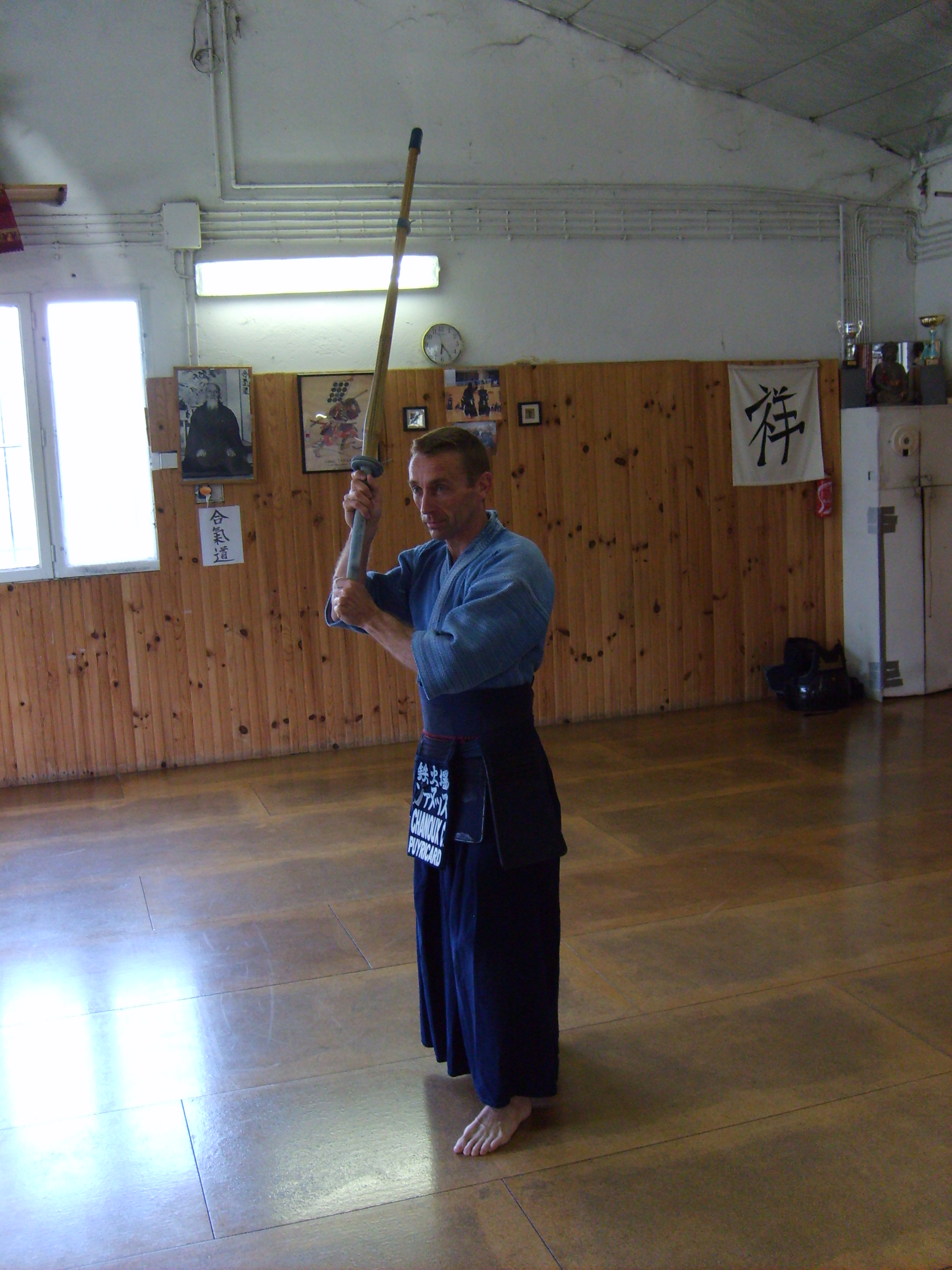
- Hassō-no-kamae in Kendo.

Japanese name
- Kanji: 八相（八双）の構え
- Hiragana: はっそうのかまえ
Transcriptions
- Revised Hepburn: hassō-no-kamae
- Kunrei-shiki: hassô-no-kamae

Hassō-no-kamae (八相（八双）の構; "all (eight) directions"), frequently shortened simply to hassō and occasionally called hassō-gamae, is one of the five stances in kendo: jōdan, chūdan, gedan, hassō, and waki. It is an offensive stance, named for one's ability to respond to a situation in any direction. Waki and hassō are not commonly used in modern kendo, except in kata.

In hassō-no-kamae, the left foot is forward, and the sword is held pointing upright with the hilt in front of the right shoulder. The blade should slope slightly to the rear. When cutting, the sword is raised above the head, as in jōdan.

Hassō-no-kamae is used by uchidachi in the 4th kendo kata, opposite shidachi's waki-gamae. This posture is also used in Naginata.

It is also used in Kashima Shinden Jikishinkage-ryū's kata.

Hassō is called in-no-kamae (陰の構え, shadow stance) in Ittō-ryū and Katori Shintō-ryū, hassō (八相) in Shinkage-ryū, and occasionally moku-no-kamae (木の構え, stance of wood), because of the stance's resemblance to a tree.

== European schools of swordsmanship ==
In German traditions such as Liechtenauer this is called right vom Tag (the same name is also used for the equivalent of jōdan-no-kamae—German styles consider the two stances variations on one thing). It is often translated as "day" or "from the roof".
