= Shimada Toranosuke =

Japanese samurai (1810–1864)

- Born: 1810; Nakatsu, Ōita, Japan
- Died: 1864 (aged 53–54)
- Style: Kenjutsu (swordsmanship); Kashima Shinden Jikishinkage-ryū

Shimada Toranosuke (1810–1864) was a Japanese samurai from Nakatsu, Ōita. His father was Shimada Chikafusa. He studied Kashima Shinden Jikishinkage-ryū kenjutsu under Otani Nobutomo and zazen meditation under Sengai; he was also a student of Kitō-ryū jujutsu. He taught kenjutsu and acted as a spiritual mentor to Katsu Kaishū.

Shimada was a skilled swordsman in his youth, and in 1837 he travelled to Edo to partake in challenge matches. His ferocity and ability with the sword brought him considerable success, and he finally issued a challenge to Otani Nobutomo, who was at the time the most highly regarded swordsman in the city. During the duel, Otani allowed Shimada to win, in order to gauge the young man's response to an easy victory. Toranosuke subsequently requested instruction from Inoue Gensai, but Inoue recommended that he visit Otani again and become his student. Sceptical of studying under a man he had previously defeated, Shimada challenged Otani to a rematch. This time, Otani defeated him utterly. After this, Otani accepted Shimada as his student.
