= Waki-gamae =

One of the five stances in kendo

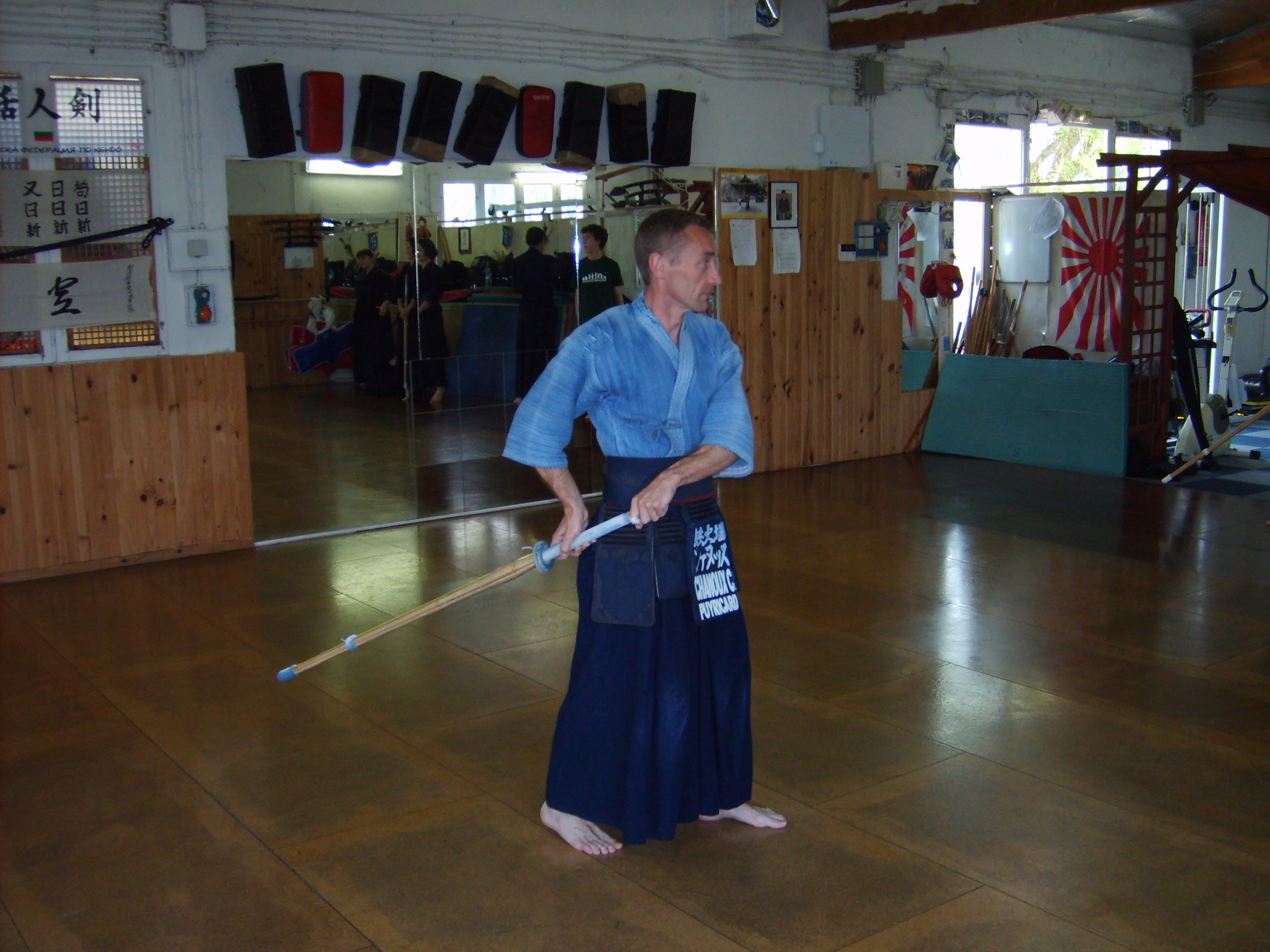
- Waki-no-kamae in Kendo.

Japanese name
- Kanji: 脇構
- Hiragana: わきがまえ
Transcriptions
- Revised Hepburn: waki-gamae
- Kunrei-shiki: waki-gamae

Waki-gamae (脇構), sometimes shortened to waki, is one of the five stances in kendo: jōdan, chūdan, gedan, hassō and waki, as well as other related and older martial arts involving Japanese sword. Waki-gamae is a stance involving the swordsman hiding the length of one's own blade behind their body, only exposing the pommel to the opponent. This stance was common when there was no standard length of sword and was often used as a deterrent to any opponents who did not know the range of the sword being hidden and could be used as a sort of bluff technique. It also serves to conceal the orientation of the blade to one's opponent, as to give him no hint about your own intention for the next attack.

Other Koryū schools may define "Waki-gamae" differently from its current form in Kendo.

Waki-gamae is also known as the Kamae of Metal (金の構, kin-no-kamae) in the five elements classification and the Light Stance (陽の構, yō-no-kamae) in the Ittō-ryū teachings.

Shidachi uses this stance in Kendo kata number 4 in response to uchidachi's hassō.

It is also used in Kashima Shinden Jikishinkage-ryū's kata.

== European schools of swordsmanship ==
In the Bolognese-Dardi Tradition this is Coda Lunga e Distesa (Long and Outstretched Tail). Coda Lunga (long tail) refers to postures where the sword is held to the outside of the knee. Coda Lunga can be point up (stretta/narrow), point down (larga/wide), or point back (distesa/outstretched).

In Marozzo's system, this is known as Guardia Contro Armi Inastate (Guard Against Polearms). It is only used for the Spadone, a two-handed sword that was up to 65" long.

This guard is similar in certain respects to the "Side Guard" or "Nebenhut" guard in the German martial school. It is demonstrated in, among other works, the treatises by Ringeck.
