= Masahiro Miyazaki =

Japanese Kendo practitioner (born 1963)

Masahiro Miyazaki (宮崎 正裕 - Miyazaki Masahiro, born 1963) is a Japanese Kendo practitioner who works for Kanagawa Prefectural Police in Japan. He participated in the All Japan Kendo Championship 12 times from 1990 to 2001 and won 6 times, more than any other competitor in the championship's history, including 2 successive victories (1998 and 1999). Because of his outstanding achievements in Kendo, he is called “the Master Swordsman of the Heisei era" and “an Iron Man of Kendo.”

Miyazaki was born in 1963 in Kanagawa Prefecture near Tokyo. He has a younger brother named Fumihiro who, like him, was a member of the Japanese National Team and is also an All-Japan Kendo Champion (1997). In 1969, Miyazaki entered Shinotani Elementary School in Yokohama City. When he was 7, he began to practice Kendo at Genbukan Sakagami Dojo. In 1981, after he graduated from Toukai Dai Huzoku Sagami High School, which had a strong Kendo Club, he started working for the Kanagawa Prefectural Police. Due to his accomplishments, Kanagawa Prefectural Police Kendo Club nominated Miyazaki as Sword Master of the Kendo Club in 2012.

Miyazaki distinguished himself from other Kendo practitioners with his aggression and speed. The average time that Miyazaki spent defeating the opponent was shorter than that of other Kendo practitioners who participated in the All Japan Kendo Championship. According to a study of Tsukuba University, Miyazaki's calf muscles are about twice as strong as regular Japanese adult men, and that makes Miyazaki's movement faster. Moreover, his interval between getting ready and striking is short: Miyazaki spends about 5.5 seconds and the other competitors spend about 7.5 seconds. Therefore, Miyazaki's matches rarely go into overtime. The short matches help him maintain his stamina.

Miyazaki passed the Kendo 8th Dan Exam in 2009. After a year, he won the All-Japan 8th Dan Tournament on his first appearance. Since Miyazaki became a sword master in 2012, he trains many Kendo practitioners to become successful. He won the All-Japan 8th Dan Tournament a second time in 2016.
