= Jirokichi Yamada =

Japanese swordsman (1863–1930)

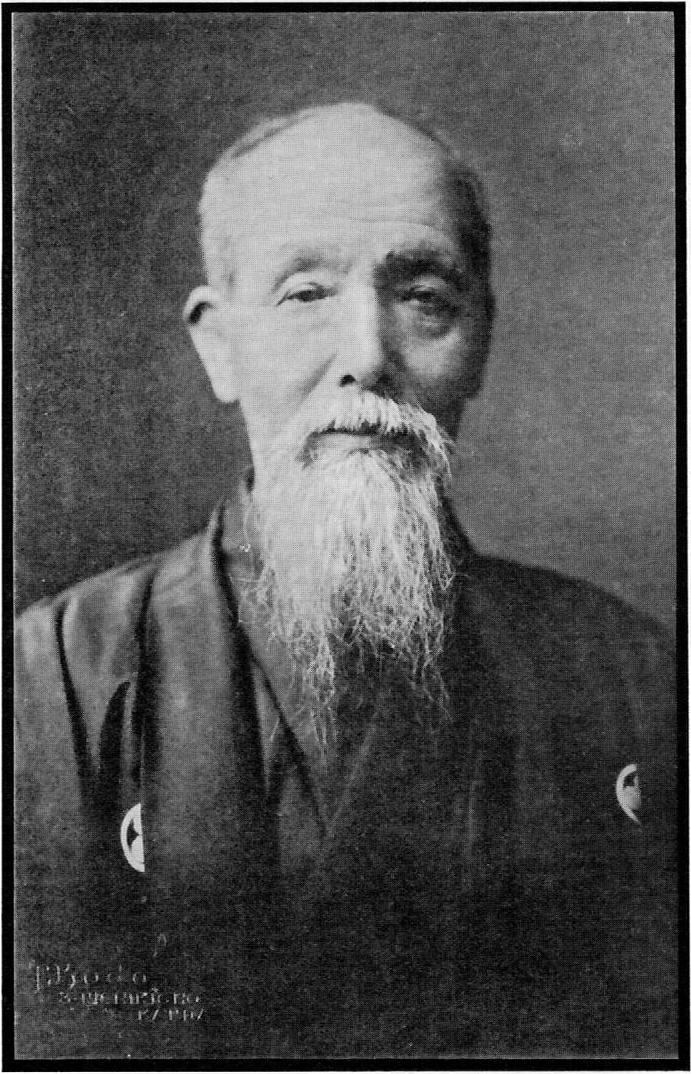
- Born: January 9, 1863; Aizu, Fukushima, Japan
- Died: October 23, 1930 (aged 67); Japan
- Native name: 山田 次朗吉
- Nationality: Japanese
- Style: Kashima Shinden Jikishinkage-ryū
- Trainer: Sakakibara Kenkichi (榊原 鍵吉)

Other information
- Notable students: Kawashima Takashi (川島 堯), Ōmori Sōgen (大森 曹玄)

Jirokichi Yamada (山田 次朗吉, Yamada Jirokichi; January 9, 1863 – October 23, 1930) was the 15th and last official headmaster or sōke of Kashima Shinden Jikishinkage-ryū, a (koryū) of the Japanese martial art of swordsmanship (kenjutsu). He was a student of the 14th sōke, Sakakibara Kenkichi (榊原 鍵吉).

In the early twentieth century (1927), he published a book documenting all five classical kata of this koryū that originates from the sixteenth century.

== See also ==
- Kashima Shinden Jikishinkage-ryū
