= Naoki Eiga =

Japanese kendoka

Naoki Eiga (栄花直輝 Eiga Naoki, born 1967) is a Japanese kendoka who in 2000 won the individual event at World Kendo Championship (WKC) as well as the highest title in Kendo: All Japan Kendo Champion. His progress toward the championship was documented by the Japanese broadcaster NHK in a 2003 program named A Single Blow. He currently holds the rank of Kyoshi Hachidan (教士八段) and is the head of technical Instruction in the Hokkaido Police Educational Department and head instructor of the Hokkaido University Kendo Club.

Naoki Eiga started kendo under the influence of his brother, Hideyuki. Both competed at the highest level of the sport. Eiga's wife Naomi was also a kendo practitioner. She was his younger classmate at Tokai University and a member of the same kendo dojo. Eiga joined the Hokkaido police force and became a member of the Hokkaido Police Kendo Team. From 1997 he was also a member of the Japanese national kendo team but as a substitute, and as such he was allowed to participate only in the preliminary bouts of the WKC team event in 1997.

Feeling that he had to earn the respect of his fellow team members and coaches of the team, he decided to concentrate on the All Japan Kendo Champion tournament. At that time, the event had been dominated for years by Masahiro Miyazaki, one of the greatest kendoists of modern times. Eiga faced Miyazaki in the quarter-finals of the 1999 tournament, but lost.

After his defeat in 1999, Eiga entered the All Japan tournament once more in 2000, and faced Miyazaki again in the finals. This time, he was able to win with the kote strike just before the match went into overtime. By winning the title of All Japan Kendo Champion of the year 2000, Eiga ended the Miyazaki era. He attributed his success to his teacher, Kazuo Furukawa.

Based on his success in the AJKC in November 2000, Eiga was chosen as team captain of the Japanese national team for the World Kendo Championship 2003 in Glasgow, Scotland.

On 21 April 2019, Eiga won the 17th All Japan 8 Dan Holder's Championship, defeating Matsumoto Masashi with a men strike in encho.

On 16 April 2023, Eiga won his second title at the 23rd All Japan 8 Dan Holder's Championship, defeating Kazuhiko Aiko with a men strike in regulation time following a two year tournament hiatus due to COVID-19.
