= Jōdan-no-kamae =

Basic kenjutsu posture

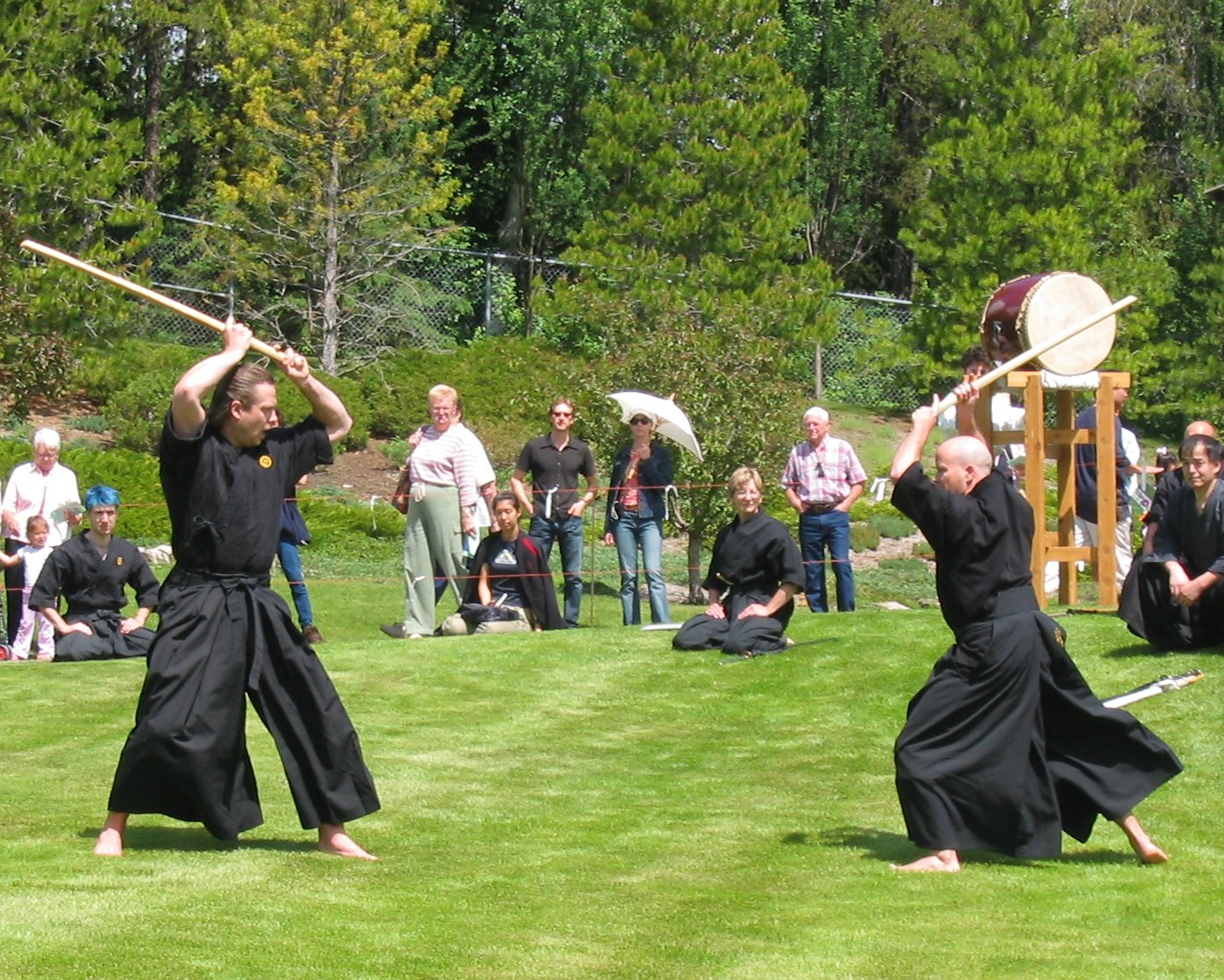
Two kenjutsu practitioners face off, both in jōdan-no-kamae, at the Devonian Botanical Garden at the University of Alberta, Edmonton, Alberta, Canada (June 5, 2005).

Jōdan-no-kamae (上段の構え:じょうだんのかまえ), also known as jōdan-gamae, and frequently shortened simply to jōdan, is a basic kenjutsu posture. (It is also found in naginatajutsu but is far less used due to the length of the weapon involved.) Jōdan-no-kamae means upper-level posture (lit. 'high/upper degree posture').

== Kendo ==
Jōdan-no-kamae is one of the five stances in kendo: jōdan, chūdan, gedan, hassō and waki. In jōdan-no-kamae, the sword is raised above the head with the tip (kissaki; 切先) pointing back and the blade facing up, in readiness to strike. It is the most aggressive stance of the five.

There are commonly two types of jōdan-no-kamae, left (hidari; 左) and right (migi; 右), referring to which foot is out in front. As a more rare case, only one hand is used to hold the sword. Even rarer, the positions of the hands on the hilt of the sword may be reversed.

In normal practice or competitions, left (hidari) jōdan-gamae is the most common. Its advantage is the reach of the strike, the intimidating posture and the speed of the strike. Its disadvantage is the weak defense, since the throat, wrists and body are open. In order to protect the vulnerable area, a jōdan user must have a very fiery spirit to "scare off" the opponent. It is also more difficult to judge the striking distance (maai; 間合い). Therefore, this stance is only used as the normal stance during practice or competition by experienced kendōka (剣道家).

Both jōdan-no-kamae positions are used in Nihon Kendo Kata.

== Iaido ==
According to Zen Nippon Kendō Renmei Iaidō style, Morote Hidari Jōdan-no-kamae posture is used in 2 Iaido Kata:

- Nanahon Me Sanpogiri
- Juppon Me Shihogiri

== Kenjutsu ==
As one of the most basic postures, jōdan-no-kamae is common to virtually all schools of kenjutsu. The primary attribute of jōdan-no-kamae is always the weapon lifted above the head of the practitioner. One of the only significant variations is the relative position of the elbows. Some styles, such as aiki-ken, prefer the elbows to be as far inward as possible. Many others insist on the elbows being open.

Jōdan-no-kamae is called the Kamae of Heaven (天の構え, ten-no-kamae) in Yagyū Shinkage-ryū and the Kamae of Fire (火の構え, hi-no-kamae) in Shinkage-ryū.

== Naginata ==
Jōdan-no-kamae is a guard stance in Naginata. Both hands are above the head, and the naginata is lined up against the opponent, roughly parallel to the ground. The ishizuki (the blunt end) is pointed towards the enemy, while the kissaki is back, away from your opponent. From this position, the naginata can be brought down to strike your opponent.

== European schools of swordsmanship ==
Similar stances to Jōdan-no-kamae are also found in German and Italian schools of the longsword. It is known as Dach ("roof") and bocca di falcone ("falcon's beak") respectively. One-handed variants also exist for the single sword (Schwert) and falchion (Messer). Another tradition that includes this posture is the English master George Silver's teachings, where it is known as the "open fight."

In German traditions such as Liechtenauer and Meyer this is called center vom Tag (From the Roof), Tag (Day), or Oberhut (High Guard).

In Italian traditions such as Bolognese-Dardi this would be referred to as Guardia Alta or High Guard.
