= Men (kendo) =

Technical term in Kendo

Men, written with the kanji (面) means "face" or "helmet".

Men is one of the five strikes in kendo (along with tsuki, dō, hidari kote and migi kote). It is a long slashing stroke that falls on the centre-line of the head. Men also designates the movement, the target, and the part of the kendo armour that covers the whole head. The kiai for this strike, as for all strikes in kendo, is the name of the target area.

The men strike is executed as a vertical slash in numerous ways. The basic technique is to raise the shinai or sword such that it is forty-five degrees from the vertical behind the swordsman's head, with the tip either directly above the tsuba or directly above the right point of the acromion (as viewed from the front), and the left hand exactly one fist from the forehead. From this position, power is given from the left hand to bring the sword down. At the point at which the shinai strikes the opponent, both right and left hands should be squeezed for a second which is called tenouchi, (手の内) also the right arm must be exactly parallel with the ground and at shoulder height. The shoulders should be relaxed. At the moment of the strike, both hands should flex inwards in a movement called shibori, (絞り) the Japanese verb for "to wring out (a cloth)". This flexion should only be maintained for an instant. It serves to make the strike clean, fast, and bring the shinai off the target area such that a follow-up strike can be made with great ease.

Sa-yu men (左右面) strikes - or hidari (left, 左) and migi (right, 右) men, respectively - are variants on the men strike and are made at points either fifteen degrees to the left or right of centreline as drawn from the point between the eyes to the top of the head. This strike is made only with a subtle variation on the basic men technique. The tip is simply directed slightly more left or right as it is cocked back into the ready position.

Men is the first and most practiced strike in kendo. It is a favourable attack for those with a height advantage.
