= Tsuki =

Martial arts term meaning "to thrust"

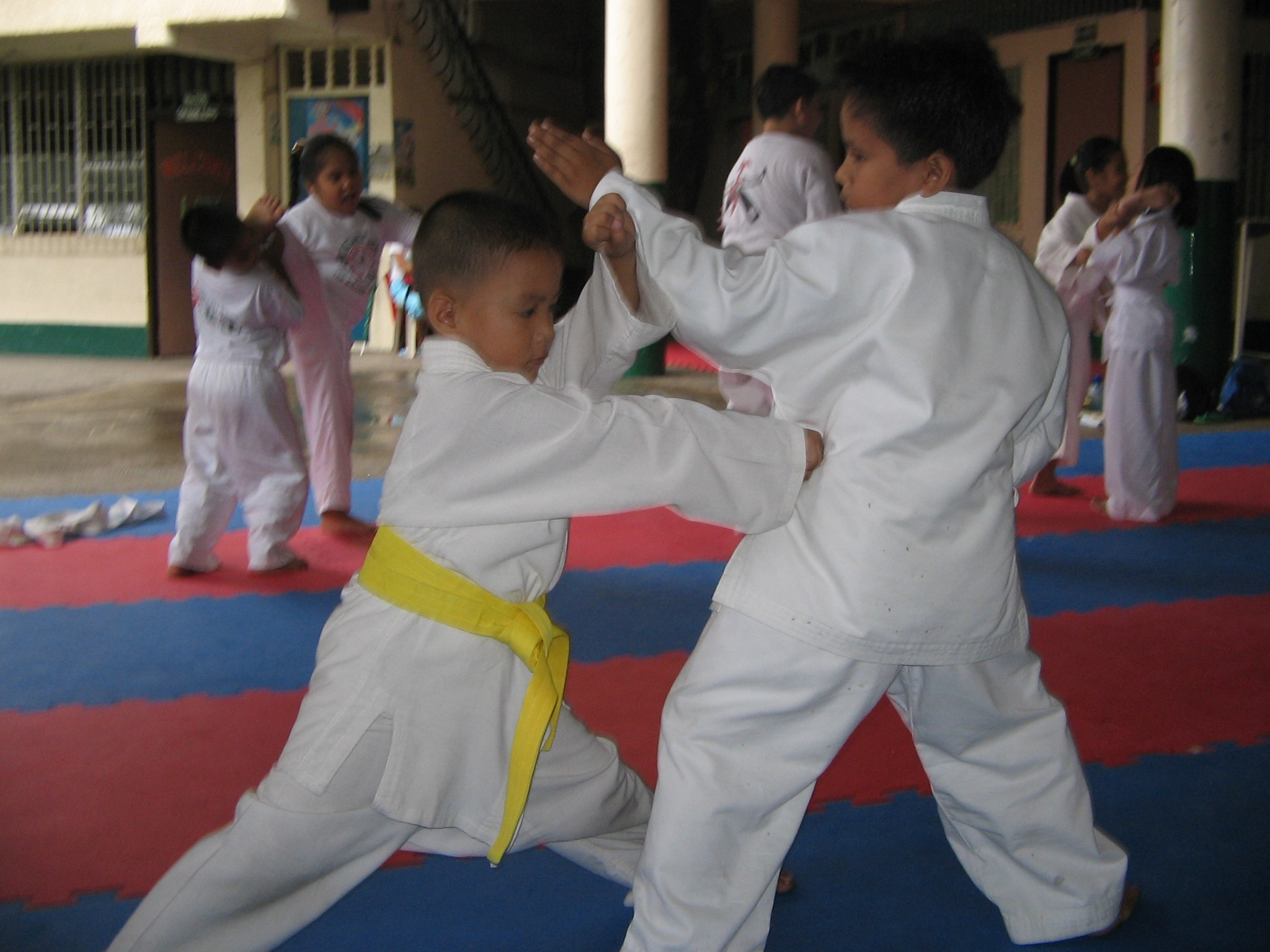
- A successful tsuki in Karate

Japanese name
- Kanji: 突き
- Hiragana: つき
Transcriptions
- Revised Hepburn: tsuki
- Kunrei-shiki: tuki

Tsuki (突き) derives from the verb tsuku (突く), meaning "to thrust". The second syllable is accented, with Japanese's unvoiced vowels making it pronounced almost like "ski" (but preceded by a "t" sound). In Japanese martial arts and Okinawan martial arts, tsuki is used to refer to various thrusting techniques.

== Tsuki in Karate ==
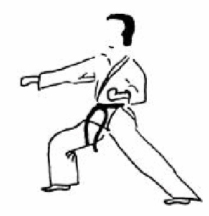
Oi-tsuki

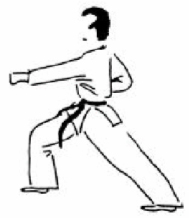
Gyaku-tsuki

In karate and its variants, the term tsuki is used as a part of a compound word for any one of a variety of thrusting techniques (usually punches). It is never used as a stand-alone term to describe a discrete technique. For example, gyaku seiken chudan-tsuki, more commonly referred to as chudan-tsuki (段突), refers to a mid-level (chudan) punch (tsuki) executed with the rear (gyaku) arm. Note that in a compound word, where tsuki does not come first, its pronunciation and writing changes slightly due to rendaku, and it is pronounced as "zuki" (and is sometimes transliterated that way).

=== Performing a Choku-Tsuki (Straight Punch) in Karate ===
The choku-tsuki (直突き) – straight punch—is a basic karate technique. It is performed by closing the hand in a fist. Target contact is made with the first two knuckles of the fore-fist, with the fist rotated slightly, both externally and downwards, so as to align the wrist directly behind the first two knuckles. For a right choku-tsuki, the right fist is chambered at a preparatory position, at the hips or by the ribs, with the palm side of the fist pointed upwards. At the same time, the left arm is extended in front of the left hip. To perform the choku-tsuki technique, the right fist is thrust forward in a direct path toward the target, with the elbow directly behind the fist and tracing the fist's path. At the same time, the left fist is pulled back to a chambered position at the hip or at the rib cage. The extending fist remains palm up until the last two inches of the punch, during which it rotates to face down. The elbow remains pointed down, since allowing the elbow to rotate to the side or upwards exposes it to injury from either self-inflicted hyperextension, or from a stiff block by the opponent. Ideally, the fist contacts the target in a vertical to a 45 degree rotated position, with the rest of the fist's rotation taking place following initial contact.

Karate gives special emphasis to the withdrawing hand – hikite (引き手) – which pulls back as the thrusting arm punches. Practitioners are advised to pay as much attention to the pullback action as to the extension of the main punch. Different karate styles will have slightly different pullback chambering positions, varying from as low as on top of the hip, to as high as the armpit.

A straight punch executed from a front stance (zenkutsu-dachi) is called gyaku-tsuki (逆突き, reverse punch) if the advanced leg and fist are on opposite sides, or oi-tsuki (追い突き, forward punch or lunge punch) if the leg and fist are on the same side.

=== Tsuki Power Generation ===
The mechanism of power generation in thrusting techniques varies with karate style. Various karate styles and, in particular, Okinawan karate, emphasize the use of the entire body to generate the power that is delivered through the punch. This can include sequencing the activation of muscles, from lower body to upper body, to create a "wave" of power. In those styles, the body is typically well aligned and relaxed throughout the strike. On the other hand, Japanese karate styles, such as Shotokan, emphasize the movement of the hips as the main mean for generating power: The hips twist as the withdrawing (non-punching) hikite arm is pulled back while the punching arm is pushed forward, and the karateka is taught to tense the whole body and to push down his or her rear leg as the punch makes contact.

=== Other Examples of Tsuki Techniques ===
Other examples of basic tsuki techniques in karate include the following:

- Age-tsuki (上げ突き), uppercut punch
- Oi-tsuki (追い突き), lunge punch (also oi-zuki)
- Kagi-tsuki (鉤突き), hook punch
- Mawashi-tsuki (回し突き), roundhouse punch
- Morote-tsuki (双手突き), augmented punch using both hands
- Jun-tsuki (順突き), punch with the lead arm when stationary or moving back/away
- Tate-tsuki (立て突き), vertical fist punch into the middle of the chest (short-range)
- Ura-tsuki (裏突き), upside-down fist punch into solar plexus area (short-range)
- Yama-tsuki (山突き) or Rete-zuki, two-level double punch (combination of ura-zuki and jodan oi zuki)

== Tsuki in Aikido and Aiki-jo ==
In aikidō, choku-zuki (straight punch, as described above) is a basic thrusting attack from which throwing and pinning skills are taught. However, because in most aikidō schools the straight punch is the predominant punch from which defensive techniques are taught, there is little need to differentiate it from any other punch. Thus, it is shortened and simply called tsuki.

In the aiki-jō practiced in some systems of aikido and utilizing a four-foot wooden staff (jō), tsuki is used literally as part of the name of numerous thrusting techniques with the jō. With the student standing in hidari katate-gamae, the weapon is lifted to the right hand, which slides to the bottom end of the weapon. The student shuffle steps forward (suri-ashi) and the right hand pushes the weapon for the strike, allowing it to slide in the left hand, and coming to rest with the left hand gripping the jō one third the distance from the bottom end. Picture striking a billiard ball with a cue stick, except both hands grip the jō with palms down, and thumbs forward.

== Tsuki in Kendo ==
Tsuki is one of the five target areas (datotsu-bui) in kendo (along with men, do, hidari kote and migi kote). It is a thrust of the point of the shinai to the throat. The target area (datotsu-bui) for tsuki is the tsuki-bu, a multi-layered set of flaps, attached to the men (helmet) that protects the throat.

Tsuki is most often done with a two handed grip (morote-zuki (諸手突き)) and less often with only the left hand (katate-zuki (片手突き)).

Tsuki is often disallowed for younger and lower graded players in free practice and in competition (shiai) due to the higher risk of injury, as a missed tsuki attack can hit the opponent’s unprotected neck and hurt his or her windpipe.

While variants of tsuki exist in other martial arts, in kendo it has no variants—the target is always the same.

Unlike most other martial arts that use this term, in kendo, tsuki is a comprehensive term for both the movement and the target. Unlike with other strikes in kendo, the kiai for this strike is not the name of the target (the neck, or kubi) but rather the name of the attack (tsuki).

== See also ==
- Strike (attack)
