= Chūdan-no-kamae =

Weapon stance in Japanese martial arts

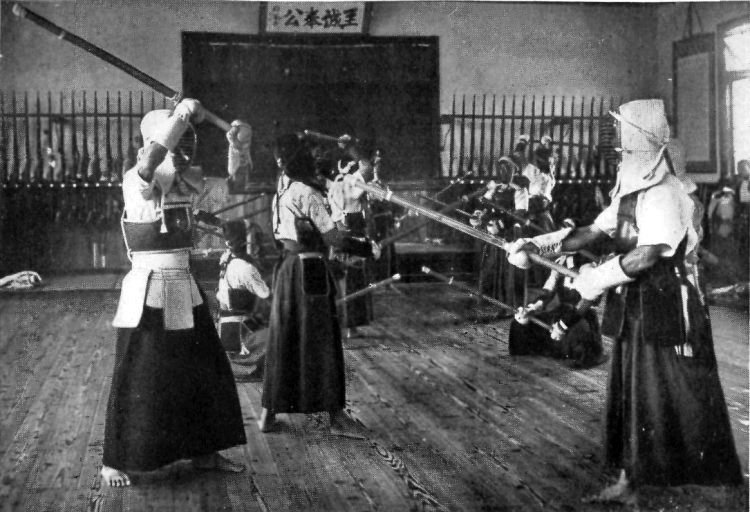
Kendo practice at an agricultural school c.1920. The person at right in the foreground is in chūdan-no-kamae, the person at left is in jōdan-no-kamae.

Chūdan-no-kamae (中段の構え:ちゅうだんのかまえ), sometimes shortened to Chūdan-gamae or simply Chūdan, is a basic weapon stance in many Japanese martial arts. The name translates literally to "middle-level stance," as the sword is held before the user at chest height. Chūdan-no-kamae is also called Seigan-no-kamae (正眼之構), or "right/correct eye posture," because the stance points the tip of the sword at the opponent's eyes. In most traditional schools of swordsmanship, and in the practice of kendo, chūdan-no-kamae is the most basic posture, as it provides a balance between attacking and defensive techniques.

== Kendo ==
Chūdan-no-kamae is one of the five stances in kendo: jōdan, chūdan, gedan, hassō and waki.

Chūdan is the most basic stance in kendo, and provides an excellent balance of offensive and defensive options. If correctly assumed, the trunk (do) and right wrist (migi-kote) are hidden from the opponent. The throat is visible, but the extended tip of the sword threatens a thrusting enemy with a likely counter-thrust. The head (men) is the only clearly open target, but this too is easily defended. If the overall posture, or kamae, is maintained, the user can step into striking distance of the opponent whilst maintaining good defence.

A beginner learns this stance first in order to learn the correct striking distance, issoku-ittō-no-maai (一足一刀の間合い).

=== Body position ===
In chūdan-no-kamae, the left foot is slightly behind the right with the left heel slightly raised, both feet are facing forward in parallel, the hips are straight forward, the shoulders are relaxed, and the spine is perpendicular to the floor at all times. The center of gravity should be centered between both feet. The shinai is held in front of the waist with both hands at roughly the height of the navel, and the tip of the weapon is pointed at the opponent's throat.

Chūdan's name, which translates to "middle stance," references how the sword is held at torso height, as opposed to the "upper stance" jōdan or the "lower stance" gedan, where the sword is held above the head or below the waist, respectively.

== Naginata ==
In naginata, chudan-no-kamae is a mid-guard position, with the naginata held at waist height. The Kissaki (the tip of the Naginata) is held pointing towards the opponent, the arms relaxed. Hands should be shoulder width apart.

The trailing hand should be holding the naginata where the upper leg meets the groin. The forward foot should be pointing forward, directly at the opponent, the trailing foot is behind, at 90 degrees, pointing to the right.

This is a mid-guard position, which can be used for engagement or disengagement. It is a convenient position, used a lot in Naginata.

== Kenjutsu ==
Because this stance offers a good balance of defense and offense, many traditional styles of kenjutsu (sword techniques) use chūdan as a basic stance, the only variation being the footwork. Generally, a much more grounded base is required to cut with power, stability, and focus. Some traditional styles may even assume zenkutsu dachi, where the feet are much wider apart, as part of this stance.

In contrast, the kenjutsu taught in the practice of aikido opts for a middle ground, where chūdan-no-kamae is assumed with the body otherwise in hanmi-dachi, a more neutral stance. The purpose is to reduce the possibility of an ai-uchi (simultaneous strike, usually resulting in mutual death), which often occurs harmlessly in kendo, but is generally undesirable in actual combat.

An additional advantage the stance offers in kenjutsu is to conceal the length of the user's sword. While this is not a consideration in kendo, as shinai are standardized, in actual combat sword lengths may vary, and because chūdan points the tip of the sword directly at the opponent's eyes, it can be difficult to accurately judge the length of the sword.

== Other kamae (positions) ==
While chūdan is the most common and basic stance, many others exist. Some of the most standard and widely-practiced kamae include:

- Gedan-no-kamae ("lower stance")
- Jōdan-no-kamae ("upper stance")
- Hassō-no-kamae ("eight-direction stance")
- Waki-gamae ("under-arm stance")

Each of these have a hidari (左) left and migi (右) right version. When indicated, hidari or migi will be prefixed to the stance, e.g. hidari gedan-no-kamae (左下段の構え), and literally describes the position ("left lower stance").

Other stances exist, and as one extreme example, the art of Tenshin Shōden Katori Shintō-ryū practices all of these and at least twice as many others, almost none of which actually use the above names.

The five kamae are also called water (chūdan), fire (jōdan), earth (gedan), wood (hassō) and metal (waki) according to the Five Elements. Alternately, in Yagyu Shinkage, they are referred to as heaven (jōdan), man (chūdan), shadow (hassō), and light (waki), with earth (gedan) being mutually shared.

== Similar European techniques ==
This stance is known as Eisenport or "Iron Gate" in German martial arts from the 14th-16th centuries. It is also similar to the Italian Posta di Breve or "short guard" stance (also called terza or the third stance, following Camillo Agrippa's naming conventions) from the same period.
