= Kōbusho =

Japanese military academy

The Kōbusho (講武所; lit. 'military training center') was a Japanese military academy. Founded on 1854, It was set up in the final decades of the Edo period as part of Japan's defensive preparations in response to Western military coercion, and taught Western-style battlefield tactics such as artillery use alongside traditional Japanese martial arts. The academy was located in Misakichō, Tokyo. It closed in 1866, after only ten years in operation.
