= Kamae =

Posture in Japanese martial arts and theater

Japanese name
- Kanji: 構え
- Hiragana: かまえ
Transcriptions
- Revised Hepburn: kamae

Kamae (構え) is a Japanese term used in martial arts and traditional theater. It translates approximately to "posture". The Kanji of this word means "base". The implied meaning is 'readiness' or 'be ready'.

Kamae is to be differentiated from the word tachi (立ち), used in Japanese martial arts to mean stance. While tachi (pronounced dachi when used in a compound) refers to the position of the body from the waist down, kamae refers to the posture of the entire body, as well as encompassing one's mental posture (i.e., one's attitude). These connected mental and physical aspects of readiness may be referred to individually as kokoro-gamae (心構え) and mi-gamae (身構え), respectively.

Although it is a generic term, context may mean there's a default specific posture which is being implicitly referred to. e.g. many modern styles use kamae by itself as shorthand usually for the style's basic stance for sparring or self-defense.

As a further note, there are also related verbs, and adding te to the end of kamae makes the command for "get ready/in position" (構えて, kamaete). Thus, a karate instructor ordering the students to assume a front stance might shout, "Zenkutsu dachi, kamaete!"

== In Aikidō ==
Kamae is a basic stance, also defined as natural. In it, the body's three centers of gravity are aligned on a vertical axis of gravity. Those three centers begin with the head, then spinal column, and lower abdomen. This allows for a balanced stance, regardless of positioning of one's feet. It also allows one to move freely into any desired direction.

== In Kendō ==
There are five basic kamae in Kendo: jōdan, chūdan, gedan, hassō and waki. Of these, chūdan-no-kamae (中段の構え; middle stance) is the most basic posture. It provides a balance between attacking and defensive techniques.

== In Karate ==
The generally used form of kamae in karate is where the martial artist places his right hand guarding the solar plexus and the left hand outstretched at shoulder height. This is to allow blocking with the left hand and counter-strikes with the right hand (or vice versa depending on the stance).

== In Taijutsu ==
The kamae in Taijutsu are considered as adaptable postures that occur as 'snapshots' of sequences of movement, rather than fixed attacking or receiving positions. The basic kamae is ichimonji-no-kamae (一文字の構え), which refers to the 'straight-line' that reflects the shape of the body when adopting this position.
