= 1900 Katyusha =

Stony main-belt asteroid

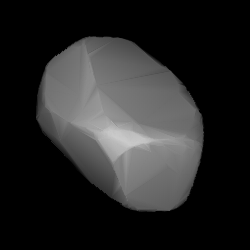
- Modelled shape of Katyusha from its lightcurve

Discovery
- Discovered by: T. Smirnova
- Discovery site: Crimean Astrophysical Obs.
- Discovery date: 16 December 1971

Designations
- Named after: Yekaterina Zelenko (Soviet war pilot)
- Alternative designations: 1971 YB · 1938 WM; 1941 SS_{1} · 1950 LS; 1953 GL_{1} · 1961 WD; 1969 DC
- Minor planet category: main-belt · Flora family

Orbital characteristics
- Epoch 4 September 2017 (JD 2458000.5)
- Uncertainty parameter 0
- Observation arc: 63.59 yr (23,226 days)
- Aphelion: 2.5075 AU
- Perihelion: 1.9116 AU
- Semi-major axis: 2.2096 AU
- Eccentricity: 0.1348
- Orbital period (sidereal): 3.28 yr (1,200 days)
- Mean anomaly: 354.20°
- Mean motion: 0° 18^{m} 0.36^{s} / day
- Inclination: 6.5426°
- Longitude of ascending node: 281.91°
- Argument of perihelion: 142.40°

Physical characteristics
- Mean diameter: 8.820±0.097 km 9 km
- Synodic rotation period: 9.4999 h (0.39583 d)
- Geometric albedo: 0.29; 0.299±0.037
- Spectral type: S
- Absolute magnitude (H): 12.2

1900 Katyusha (prov. designation: 1971 YB) is a stony background asteroid from the inner asteroid belt, approximately 9 kilometers in diameter. It was discovered on 16 December 1971, by Russian astronomer Tamara Smirnova at the Crimean Astrophysical Observatory in Nauchnyj, on the Crimean peninsula and named in honor of Yekaterina Zelenko, the only woman to credited with conducting an aerial ramming.

== Orbit and classification ==
Katyusha is a member of the Flora family, one of the largest groups of stony asteroids in the inner main-belt. It orbits the Sun in the inner main-belt at a distance of 1.9–2.5 AU once every 3 years and 3 months (1,200 days). Its orbit has an eccentricity of 0.13 and an inclination of 7° with respect to the ecliptic.

== Naming ==
This minor planet was named in honor of Ukrainian Yekaterina Zelenko (1916–1941), a war pilot and Hero of the Soviet Union, known for being the only woman who had ever executed an aerial ramming. The asteroid's name "Katyusha" is a petname for Ekaterina.

== Physical characteristics ==
It rotates around its axis with a period of 9.4999 hours and with a brightness variation of 0.72 magnitude, indicating a non-spheroidal shape.

According to the survey carried out by NASA's Wide-field Infrared Survey Explorer with its subsequent NEOWISE mission, Katyusha measures between 8.820 and 9 kilometers in diameter and its surface has an albedo between 0.29 and 0.299. Katyusha has been characterized as a S-type asteroid.
