= Kirikaeshi =

Kirikaeshi (切り返し, cutting repeatedly), not to be confused with the backwards throw used in sumo and jujutsu with the same name, is a kendo exercise, combining the practice of attacking and receiving strikes and is meant to develop physical strength, spirit, and vigor. Kirikaeshi is also known as uchikaeshi (打ち返し, striking repeatedly).

Kirikaeshi is a drill done with a partner that involves a succession of strikes to the head (面, men). Kirikaeshi was established as a basic exercise toward the end of the Meiji era (1868–1912). The exercise typically begins with a strike to the center of the head, followed by a series of alternating strikes to the left and right sides of the head (yokomen). Though the exact method of kirikaeshi can vary among dōjō, the most common scheme involves a single strike to the center of the head, followed by four angled strikes going forward (starting on the receiver's left side), and five strokes going backward. Kirikaeshi practice is the staple of kendo training. It teaches a number of important principles including proper distance and timing, accuracy, rhythm, and smoothness.

At some kendo dōjō, the practice of kirikaeshi is performed at the start and end of kendo practice sessions.

== Overview ==
When kirikaeshi is executed properly, the two players involved will benefit from the practice of precision attacking and the quick reaction/perception in receiving such an attack. The one who receives the kirikaeshi leads the attacker thus controlling the pace and maai (fighting distance) of the training. The receiver may allow hits to the head but when receiving with the shinai, must also demonstrate tenouchi (tightening the grip at the moment of impact). The attacker must make strong, precise and timed strikes while retaining relaxed shoulders and steady breathing. This will result in increased stamina.

For both the attacker and receiver, posture must be kept proper and footwork and movement should be smooth for this practice to facilitate the weeding out of bad habits. If kirikaeshi is practiced regularly, the application will benefit the practitioner from the improvement of basic skills to the perfect execution in combat.

== Technique ==
The shinai is swung up in a large movement and a normal men strike is delivered. After taiatari (body check, only if both kendōka are wearing armour), alternate right and left angled strikes to the temple area (yokomen) are given 9 times (4 forward and 5 back) while shouting "men, men, men" in a loud voice. Then the striker moves quickly from tōma to issoku-ito-no-ma (one-step striking distance), and the process is repeated. A final strike to men is delivered to complete the exercise.

When receiving Kirikaeshi with the shinai, the shinai is held in a low hasso gamae stance (waist level), alternating between left and right. The receiver uses tenouchi to shield against the partner's shinai.

== Variations ==
There are several variations on the standard kirikaeshi.

Dō Kirikaeshi
Though this variation starts exactly the same, the naname uchi is replaced with alternating dō cuts, beginning with reverse (or gyaku) dō. The receiver maintains a jōdan-no-kamae while receiving the dō cuts. This is known as a more difficult variation for having a small margin of error.
Alternating Kirikaeshi
This variation alternates between naname uchi to the men and to the dō every two cuts.
Double Kirikaeshi
This variation has both attacker and receiver performing the naname uchi. Much like blocking the attacker's shinai in the standard kirikaeshi, the receiver's naname uchi will hit the attacker's naname uchi causing them to bounce off each other, making way for the next cut. The same as the standard kirikaeshi, the target is the yokomen for both sides. Footwork is optional.
Continuous Kirikaeshi
This variation is a standard naname uchi to the men, but instead of the standard 9 strikes (4 forwards, 5 backwards), either an alternate number (50 and 100 are relatively common) or distance ("From here to the other side of the dōjō", for example) is utilized. As opposed to standard Kirikaeshi, this variation of the drill builds endurance and stamina rather than improving precision.

Kirikaeshi may be practiced differently depending on which tradition or federation the student belongs to. This article describes the common form of kirikaeshi as taught by the All Japan Kendo Federation.
