= Aerial ramming =

Attack by crashing an aircraft into another

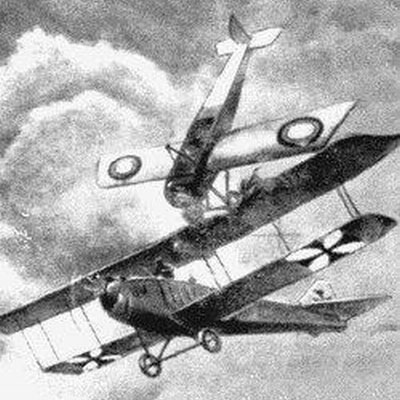
Ramming attack performed by Pyotr Nesterov

Aerial ramming or air ramming is the deliberate ramming of an aircraft in flight into another airborne target, typically another aircraft. It is a last-ditch tactic in aerial combat, sometimes used when the aircraft is out of munitions, has its weapons malfunctioned, or all else has failed. The act of ramming a flying aircraft into surface targets (e.g. tall buildings/structures, ground fortifications and surface vessels), usually in the form of a suicide attack, is commonly referred to as a kamikaze attack.

Long before the invention of aircraft, ramming tactics in naval warfare and ground warfare were common. The first aerial ramming was performed by Pyotr Nesterov in 1914 during the First World War. In the early stages of World War II the tactic was employed by Soviet pilots, who called it taran (таран), the Russian word for 'ramming" and "battering ram".

A ramming pilot could use the weight of the aircraft as a ram, or they could try to make the enemy lose control of their plane, using the propeller or wing to damage the enemy's tail or wing. Ramming took place when a pilot ran out of ammunition yet was still intent on destroying an enemy, or when the plane had already been damaged beyond saving. Most rammings occurred when the attacker's aircraft was economically, strategically or tactically less valuable than the enemy's, such as pilots flying obsolescent aircraft against superior ones, or one man risking his life to kill multiple men. Defending forces resorted to ramming more often than the attackers.

A ramming attack was not considered suicidal in the same manner as kamikaze attacks—the ramming pilot stood a chance of surviving, though it was very risky. Sometimes the ramming aircraft itself could survive to make a controlled landing, though most were lost due to combat damage or the pilot bailing out. Ramming was used in air warfare in the first half of the 20th century, in both World Wars and in the interwar period. With jet aircraft, as air combat speeds increased, ramming became disused—the probability of successfully executing (and surviving) a ramming attack approached zero. However, the tactic is still possible in modern warfare.

== Technique ==
Three types of ramming attacks were made:

- Using the propeller to go in from behind and chop off the tail controls of the enemy aircraft. This was the most difficult to perform, but it had the best chance of survival.
- Using the wing to damage the enemy or force a loss of control. Some Soviet aircraft like the Polikarpov I-16 had wings strengthened for this purpose.
- Direct ramming using the whole aircraft. This was the easiest but also the most dangerous option.

The first two options were always premeditated but required a high level of piloting skill. The last option might be premeditated or it might be a snap decision made during combat; either way it often killed the attacking pilot.

== History ==
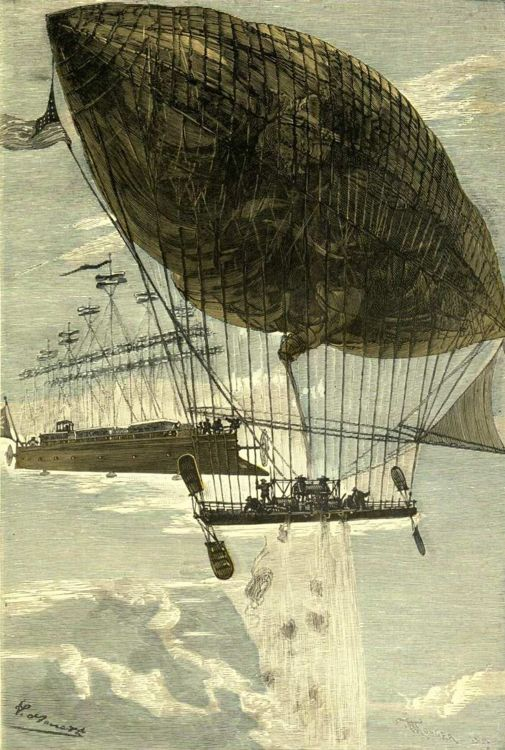
In Jules Verne's novel Robur the Conqueror, Robur almost rams his propeller-powered flying vessel Albatross into the slower blimp Goahead

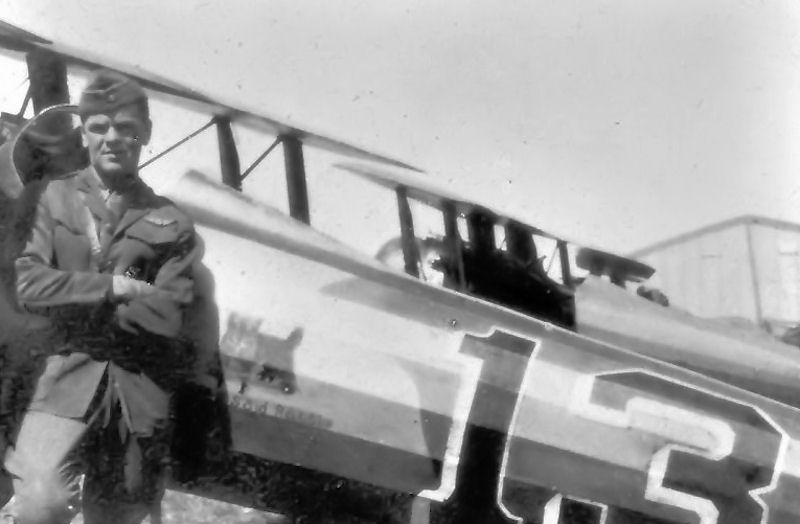
Lt Wilbert Wallace White

=== Early concepts ===
Presaging the 20th century air warfare ramming actions, Jules Verne imagined an apparent aerial attack made by a heavy flying machine with a prominent ram prow against a nearly defenseless lighter-than-air craft in his science fiction work Robur the Conqueror, published in 1886. H. G. Wells, writing in 1899 in his novel The Sleeper Awakes, has his main character, Graham, ram one of the enemy's aeroplanes with his flying apparatus, causing it to fall out of the sky. A second enemy machine ceases its attack, afraid of being rammed in turn.

In 1909, the airship was imagined as an "aerial battleship" by several observers who wrote about the possibility of using an extended ramming pole to attack other airships, and to swing an anchor or other mass on a cable below the airship as a blunt force attack against ground-based targets such as buildings and smokestacks, and against ship masts.

=== World War I ===
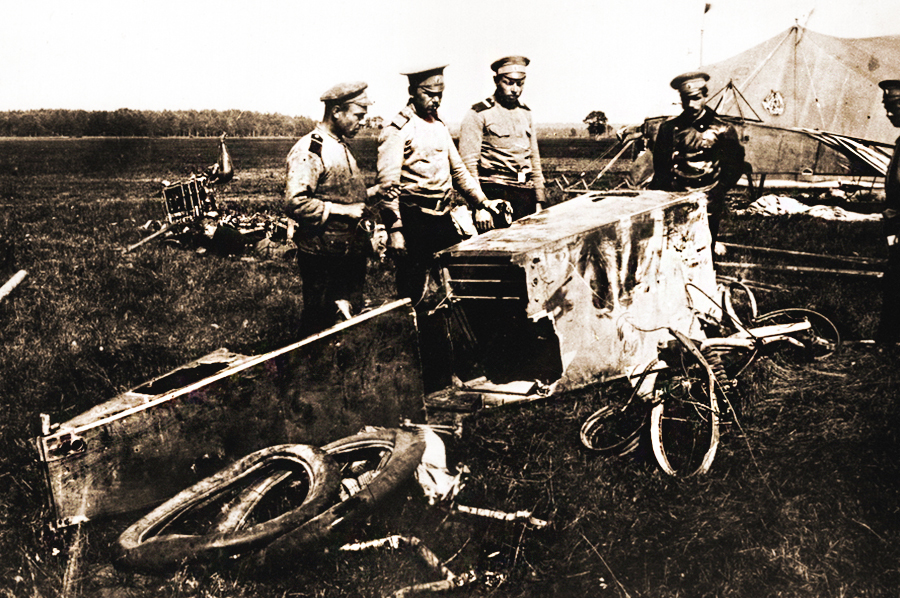
Albatros aircraft brought down by Nesterov

The first known instance of ramming in air warfare was made over Zhovkva by the Russian pilot Pyotr Nesterov on 8 September 1914, against an Austrian plane.

Nesterov's Morane-Saulnier Type G (s/n 281) and the Austrian Albatros B.II reconnaissance aircraft both crashed in the ramming, killing Nesterov and both occupants of the Austrian aircraft. The second ramming—and the first successful ramming that was not fatal to the attacker—was performed in 1915 by Alexander Kazakov, a flying ace and the most successful Russian fighter pilot of World War I. Sgt Arturo Dell'Oro of the Italian 83rd Squadron rammed a two-man Br.C.1 of Flik 45 on 1 September 1917. The American Wilbert Wallace White of the 147th Aero Squadron rammed a German plane on 10 October 1918, and was killed — his opponent survived.

=== Polish–Soviet War ===
As the advancing Soviet Red Army used very few aircraft in Poland, air combat rarely took place (except for interceptions of Bolshevik observation balloons). However, during the course of the war, several Polish pilots, having depleted their ammunition and bombs, attempted to ram Soviet cavalry with their aircraft's undercarriages. This attack allowed an opportunity for an emergency landing, but it almost always ended with the destruction of, or serious damage to, the ramming aircraft.

=== Spanish Civil War ===
Ramming was used in the Spanish Civil War. On the night of 27–28 November 1937, Soviet pilot Evgeny Stepanov, flying a Polikarpov I-15 for the Spanish Republican Air Force, shot down one SM.81 bomber near Barcelona and emptied the rest of his ammunition into another. The second SM.81 continued to fly, so Stepanov resorted to using the left leg of his Chaika's undercarriage to ram the bomber, downing the plane.

=== World War II ===
==== Soviet Union ====
In World War II, reports of ramming by lone Soviet pilots against the Luftwaffe became widespread, especially in the early days of the hostilities in the war's Eastern Front. In the first year of the Great Patriotic War, most available Soviet machines were markedly inferior to the German ones and pilots sometimes perceived a taran as the only way to guarantee the destruction of the enemy. Early Soviet fighter engines were relatively weak, and the underpowered fighters were either fairly well-armed but too slow, or fast but too lightly armed. Lightly armed fighters often expended their ammunition without bringing down the enemy bomber. Very few fighters had radios installed—the pilots had no way to call for assistance and the military expected them to solve problems alone. Trading a single fighter for a multi-engine bomber was considered economically sound. In some cases, pilots who were heavily wounded or in damaged aircraft decided to perform a suicidal attack against air, ground or naval targets. In this instance, the attack becomes more like an unpremeditated kamikaze attack (see Nikolai Gastello).

German air tactics early in the war changed in a way that created conditions ripe for ramming attacks. After clearing much of Soviet airpower from their path, the Luftwaffe stopped providing fighter escort for bombing groups, and split their forces into much smaller sorties, including single aircraft making deep penetration flights. One quarter of German aircraft on the Eastern Front had the task of performing strategic or tactical reconnaissance with their Aufklärungsgruppe units. These reconnaissance or long-range bombing flights were more likely to encounter lone Soviet defenders. Soviet group tactics did not include taran, but Soviet fighters often sortied singly or in pairs rather than in groups. Soviet pilots were prohibited from performing taran over enemy-held land, but could ram enemy reconnaissance penetrations over the homeland.

Nine rammings took place on the very first day of the German invasion of the Soviet Union, one within the first hour. At 0425 hours on 22 June 1941, Lieutenant Ivan Ivanov supposedly drove his Polikarpov I-16 into the tail of an invading Heinkel He 111. Ivanov did not survive but was posthumously awarded the Gold Star medal, Hero of the Soviet Union.

Yekaterina Zelenko on 12 September 1941 supposedly performed a diving ramming attack in her Su-2, which tore a Messerschmitt Bf 109 in two as the propeller of her plane hit the German aircraft's tail. She remains the only woman ever alleged to have performed an aerial ramming.

After 1943 more Soviet fighters had radios installed, and Chief Marshall Alexander Novikov developed air-control techniques to coordinate attacks. The fighters had more powerful engines, and in the last year of battle they carried sufficiently heavy armament. As Soviet air-attack options improved, ramming became a rare occurrence. In 1944, future Air Marshall Alexander Pokryshkin officially discouraged the taran, limiting it to "exceptional instances and as an extreme measure".

Lieutenant Boris Kovzan supposedly survived a record four ramming attacks in the war. Aleksei Khlobystov supposedly made three. Seventeen other Soviet pilots were credited with two successful ramming attacks. According to new research, at least 636 successful taran attacks were made by Soviets between the beginning of Operation Barbarossa and the end of the war. Of these, 227 pilots were killed during the attack or afterwards (35.7%), 233 landed safely, and the rest bailed out.

As new Soviet fighter designs went into service, ramming was discouraged. The economics had shifted; now the Soviet fighter was roughly equivalent to the German one. By September 1944, orders describing how and when to initiate the ramming attack were removed from training materials.

==== United Kingdom and Commonwealth ====
On 18 August 1940, Royal Air Force Volunteer Reserve Sergeant Bruce Hancock of No.6 SFTS from RAF Windrush used his Avro Anson aircraft to ram a Heinkel He 111P; there were no survivors.

On the same day Flight Lieutenant James Eglington Marshall of No. 85 Squadron RAF used his Hawker Hurricane to ram the tail unit of a Heinkel He 111 after he had expended the last of his ammunition on it. The Hurricane's starboard wing tip broke off in the attack and the Heinkel was assessed as "probably destroyed".

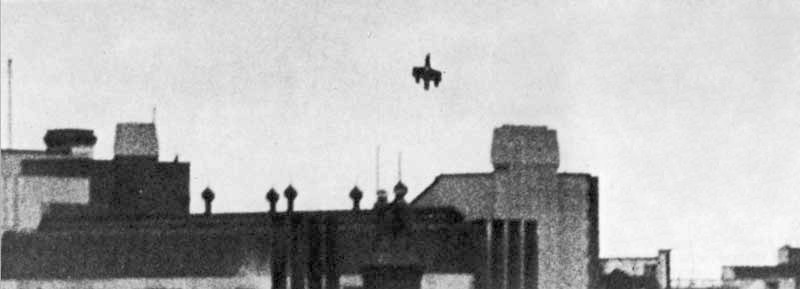
Zehbe's Dornier falling on Victoria Station after being rammed by Ray Holmes, 15 September 1940

A significant event took place during the Battle of Britain. Flight Sergeant Ray Holmes of No. 504 Squadron RAF used his Hawker Hurricane to destroy a Dornier Do 17 bomber over London by ramming but at the loss of his own aircraft (and almost his own life) in one of the defining moments of the Battle of Britain. Holmes, making a head-on attack, found his guns inoperative. He flew his plane into the top-side of the German bomber, cutting off the rear tail section with his wing and causing the bomber to dive out of control and crash. Its pilot, Oberleutnant Robert Zehbe, bailed out, only to die later of wounds suffered during the attack, while the injured Holmes bailed out of his plane and survived. Two other crewmen of the Dornier bailed out and survived. As the RAF did not practice ramming as an air combat tactic, this was considered an impromptu manoeuvre, and an act of selfless courage. This event became one of the defining moments of the Battle of Britain and elicited a congratulatory note to the RAF from Queen Wilhelmina of the Netherlands, who had witnessed the event.

On 27 September 1940, Flying Officer Percival R. F. Burton (South African) of No. 249 Squadron RAF used his Hawker Hurricane to tear off the tail unit of a Messerschmitt Bf 110 of V/LG 1. According to eyewitnesses on the ground, Burton deliberately rammed the Bf 110 after a "wildly manoeuvring" chase at rooftop height over Hailsham, England. Burton, Hauptmann Horst Liensberger and Unteroffizier Albert Kopge were all killed when both aircraft crashed just outside town. Burton's Hurricane was found exhausted of ammunition.

On 7 October 1940, Pilot Officer Ken W. Mackenzie of No. 501 Squadron RAF used his Hawker Hurricane to destroy a Messerschmitt Bf 109. His Combat Report read:

I attacked the three nearest machines in vic formation from beneath and a fourth enemy aircraft doing rear-guard flew across the line of fire and he developed a leak in the glycol tank... I emptied the rest of my ammunition into him from 200 yards but he still flew on and down to 80, to 100 feet off the sea. I flew around him and signalled him to go down, which had no result. I therefore attempted to ram his tail with my undercarriage but it reduced my speed too low to hit him. So flying alongside I dipped my starboard wing-tip onto his port tail plane. The tail plane came off and I lost the tip of my starboard wing. The enemy aircraft spun into the sea and partially sank.

On 11 November 1940, Flight Lieutenant Howard Peter Blatchford (Canadian) of No. 257 Squadron RAF used the propeller of his Hawker Hurricane to attack a Fiat CR.42 near Harwich, England. Blatchford had used up his ammunition during a mêlée with Italian fighters, and upon returning to base discovered two of his propeller blades missing nine inches. Although he did not see the results of his attack and only claimed the Italian fighter as "damaged", he did report splashes of blood on his damaged propeller.

Although technically not ramming, RAF pilots did use an intentional collision of sorts against the V-1 flying bomb. When it was discovered that shooting a V-1 could detonate the warhead and/or fuel tank, thereby endangering the attacking aircraft, pilots would instead fly beside the V-1. Once in position, the pilot would roll to one side, lifting his wingtip to produce an area of high-pressure turbulence beneath the wingtip of the V-1, causing it to roll in the opposite direction. This tactic was known amongst pilots as wing tipping/wing wacking. The rudimentary automatic pilot of the V-1 was often not able to compensate, sending it diving into the ground.

==== Greece ====
On 2 November 1940, Greek pilot Marinos Mitralexis shot down one Italian Savoia-Marchetti SM.79 bomber; then, out of ammunition, brought another down by smashing its rudder with the propeller of his PZL P.24 fighter. Both aircraft were forced into emergency landings, and Mitralexis threatened the bomber's four-man crew into surrender using his pistol. Mitralexis was promoted in rank and awarded medals.

==== Japan ====
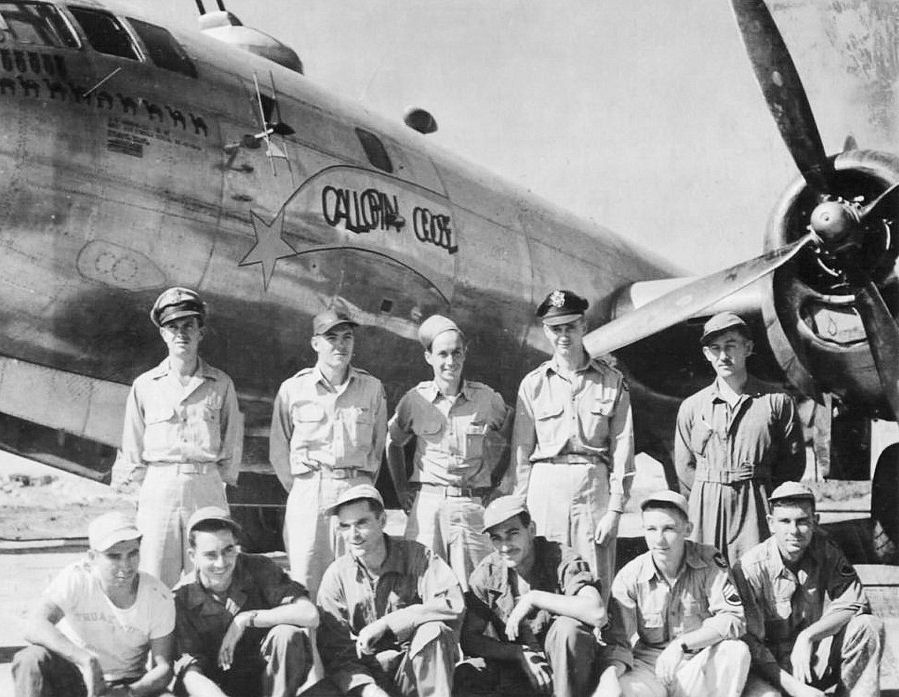
Crew of the Boeing B-29 Superfortress "Gallopin' Goose". It was lost on December 7, 1944, when it was rammed by a Kawasaki Ki-45 "Nick" being flown by Sgt. Shinobu Ikeda of the 25th Dokuritsu Chutai. Only the tail gunner was able to bail out.

The Japanese also practised tai-atari ramming, both by individual initiative and by policy. Individual initiative saw a Nakajima Ki-43 fighter plane bringing down a lone B-17 Flying Fortress, The Fighting Swede, on 8 May 1943. After three of the Japanese fighters had each made two attack passes without decisive results, the bomber's pilot, Major Robert N. Keatts, made for the shelter of a nearby rain-squall. Loath to let the bomber escape, Sgt. Tadao Oda executed a head-on ramming attack, known as taiatari (体当たり, tai-atari; "body strike"). Both aircraft crashed with no survivors. Sergeant Oda was posthumously promoted to lieutenant for his sacrifice.

On 26 March 1943, Lieutenant Sanae Ishii of the 64th Sentai used the wing of his Nakajima Ki-43 to ram the tail of a Bristol Beaufighter, bringing it down over Shwebandaw, Burma, killing both Squadron Leader Ivan G. Statham AFC and Pilot Officer Kenneth C. Briffett of 27 Squadron RAF.

On 1 May 1943 Sergeant Miyoshi Watanabe of the 64th Sentai knocked out two engines of a B-24 Liberator piloted by Robert Kavanaugh, killing two of the bombers crew; he then used his Nakajima Ki-43 to ram the rear turret of the American bomber after a drawn-out battle over Rangoon. Sergeant Watanabe survived the attack, as did the remaining B-24 crew. Both planes made a forced landing without further loss of life. The crashed B-24 was photographed and appeared in the December 1943 Japanese aviation magazine Koku Asahi. Only three of Kavanaugh's crew survived the war under harsh conditions as POWs.

On 26 October 1943 Corporal Tomio Kamiguchi of the 64th Sentai used his Nakajima Ki-43 to ram a B-24J Liberator, when his guns failed to fire during a sustained attack lasting over 50 minutes by Ki-43II and Kawasaki Ki-45s of 21st Sentai. The engagement included approximately 50 two-ship passes on the B-24s after they attacked Rangoon. Nearing the Bay of Bengal and already heavily damaged by the other Japanese fighters in the 64th, the bomber, named "Boogie Woogie Bomb Buggy," belonging to the 492nd Bomb Squadron and piloted by 1st Lt. Roy G. Vaughan, crashed in the jungle approaching Gwa Bay. Bombardier 2nd Lt. Gustaf 'Gus' Johnston was the sole survivor of the B-24 and became a POW. Kamiguchi was thrown clear in the impact, parachuted, and also survived. American researcher Matthew Poole notes that Japanese historian Hiroshi Ichimura interviewed 64th Sentai veteran Lt. Naoyuki Ito, who also claimed to have shot down a B-24 of the 492nd BS on 26 October 1943. The B-24 was claimed to have been shot down by two experienced Japanese aces: Lt. Naoyuki Ito and Sgt. Major Takuwa. In addition, Ito stated that 19-year-old green pilot Cpl. Kamiguchi rammed the crippled B-24, and General Major Shinichi Tanaka praised the brave young pilot and intentionally made "Corporal Saw" a legend. Another 64th Sentai veteran, Sgt. Ikezawa, recalled that a sullen Sgt. Major Takuwa said to him "The B-24 was going down. Kamiguchi did not need to ram it!" I. Hata, Y. Izawa, and C. Shores in Japanese Army Air Force Fighter Units and Their Aces 1939–1945 includes the biography of Capt. Ito of the 64th Sentai which states: “He later transferred to the 3rd Chutai, and was to claim eight victories, including a B-24 over Rangoon on 26 October 1943.” According to Ichimura, Sgt. Maj. Takuwa's account was not included in this source, as only aces with nine or more victories were given a biography in the book.

On 6 June 1944, having expended his ammunition in an extended dogfight, Sergeant Tomesaku Igarashi of the 50th Sentai used the propeller of his Nakajima Ki-43 to bring down a Lockheed P-38 Lightning near Meiktila, Burma. After the pilot bailed out, Igarashi attacked him in his parachute. Sergeant Shinobu Ikeda of the 25th Dokuritsu Chutai rammed his Ki-45 into Cpt. Roger Parrish's B-29 "Gallopin Goose" (42-6390) on 7 December over Mukden. Sgt. Ikeda and all except one crew member of the B-29 perished.

Starting in August 1944, several Japanese pilots flying Kawasaki Ki-45 and other fighters engaging B-29 Superfortresses found that ramming the very heavy bomber was a practical tactic. From that experience, in November 1944 a "Special Attack Unit" was formed using Kawasaki Ki-61s that had been stripped of most of their weapons and armor so as to quickly achieve high altitude. Three successful surviving ramming pilots were the first recipients of the Bukosho, Japan's equivalent to the Victoria Cross or Medal of Honor, an award which had been inaugurated on 7 December 1944 as an Imperial Edict by Emperor Hirohito. Membership in the Special Attack Unit was seen as a final assignment; the pilots were expected to perform ramming attacks until death or serious injury stopped their service.

The Japanese practice of kamikaze may also be viewed as a form of ramming, although the primary mode of destruction was not physical impact force, but rather the explosives carried. Kamikaze was used exclusively against Allied ship targets.

==== Bulgaria ====
Two rammings (Bulgarian: Таран, romanized: taran) were performed by Bulgarian fighter pilots defending Sofia against Allied bombers in 1943 and 1944. The first one was by poruchik (Senior Lieutenant) Dimitar Spisarevski on 20 December 1943. Flying a Bf 109 G2 fighter, he rammed and destroyed American B-24 Liberator #42-73428 of the 376th Bomb Group, though it is unknown whether the collision was intentional. The Bulgarian military said it was deliberate, and increased his rank posthumously. The second ramming was performed by poruchik Nedelcho Bonchev on 17 April 1944 against an American B-17 Flying Fortress. Bonchev succeeded in bailing out and surviving after the ramming. After the fall of the Third Bulgarian Kingdom 9 September 1944 he went on flying against the Germans. His Bf 109 was shot down during a mission and he was wounded and taken captive. After several months in captivity, he was killed by a female SS guard during a POW march which he could not take, owing to his critical health condition.

==== Germany ====
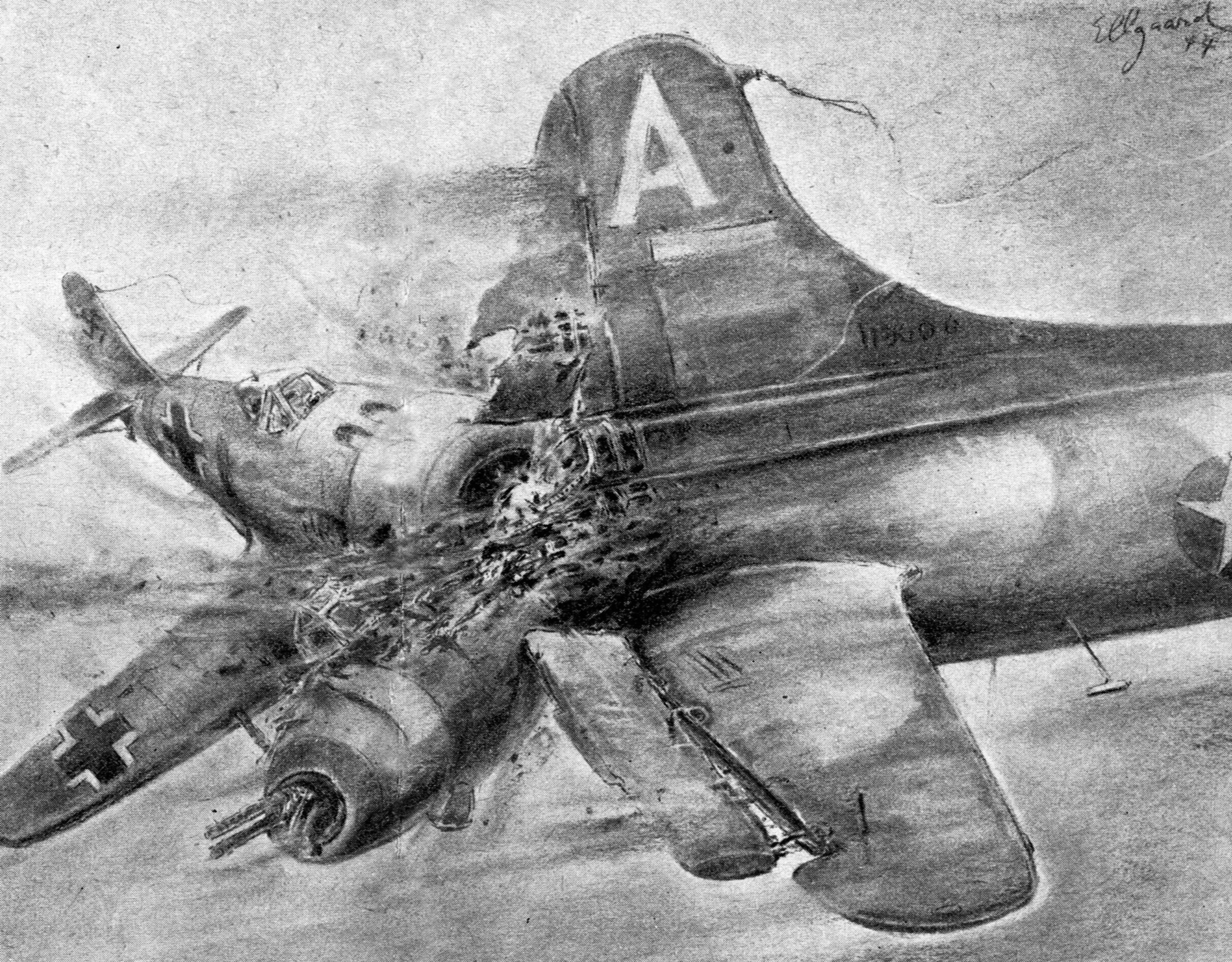
A 1944 drawing by Helmuth Ellgaard illustrating a Fw 190 ramming a B-17 Flying Fortress.

On 22 February 1944 a Messerschmitt Bf 109 rammed B-17 231377 of the 327th Bombardment Squadron.

On 25 May 1944 Oberfähnrich Hubert Heckmann used his Messerschmitt Bf 109 to ram a P-51 Mustang when his guns malfunctioned, severing the tail and rear fuselage from the American aircraft. Captain Joseph H. Bennett of the 336th Fighter Squadron managed to bail out to captivity, while Heckmann made an immediate belly landing near Botenheim, Germany.

On 7 July 1944 Unteroffizier Willi Reschke used his Messerschmitt Bf 109 to ram a Consolidated B-24 Liberator when his guns malfunctioned. The two falling aircraft were locked together, and it was some time before Reschke was able to free himself and bail out near Malacky, Slovakia.

Late in World War II, the Luftwaffe used ramming to try to regain control of the air. The plan was to dissuade Allied bomber pilots from conducting bombing raids long enough for the Germans to create a significant number of Messerschmitt Me 262 jet fighters to turn the tide of the air war. On 4 April 1945 Heinrich Ehrler rammed a B-24 and was killed. Only a single dedicated unit, Sonderkommando Elbe, was ever formed to the point of being operational, and flew their only mission – only a month before the end of the war in Europe – on 7 April 1945. Although some pilots succeeded in destroying bombers, Allied numbers were not significantly reduced. Perhaps the most famous example of aerial ramming carried out by Elbe that resulted in the pilot surviving ramming their plane during this mission was that of Heinrich Rosner's Bf 109 vs. B-24 44-49533 "Palace of Dallas", which was leading a formation of B-24s of the 389th Bombardment Group at the time. Rosner's plane sliced through the cockpit of "Palace of Dallas" with its wing, destroying the bomber and crippling the Bf-109, which then collided with an additional unidentified B-24. Rosner was able to successfully bail out and parachute to safety.

Projects of aircraft such as the Gotha and Zeppelin Rammjäger concepts were intended to use the ramming technique.

==== France ====
On 3 August 1944, Captain Jean Maridor of No. 91 Squadron RAF used his Supermarine Spitfire to ram a V-1 flying bomb, killing himself when the warhead detonated. Capitaine Maridor had previously damaged the V-1 with his cannon fire, and seeing it begin to dive onto a military field hospital in Kent, chose to deliberately ram the bomb.

==== United States ====
On 25 October 1942 over Guadalcanal, Marine First Lieutenant Jack E. Conger of VMF-212 shot down three Mitsubishi A6M Zeroes. Pursuing a fourth Zero, Conger ran out of ammunition and decided to use his propeller to chop the tail rudder off. However, Conger misjudged the distance between his plane and the Zero and struck the plane halfway between the cockpit and the tail, tearing the entire tail off. Both Conger and the Zero pilot, Shiro Ishikawa, bailed out of their planes and were picked up by a rescue boat. For his actions, Conger was awarded the Navy Cross.

During the battle of the Coral Sea, SBD pilot Stanley "Swede" Vejtasa was attacked by three A6M2 "Zero" fighters; he shot down two of them and cut off the wing of the third in a head-on pass with his wingtip.

On 10 May 1945 over Okinawa, Marine First Lieutenant Robert R. Klingman and three other pilots of VMF-312 climbed to intercept an aircraft they identified as a Kawasaki Ki-45 Toryu ("Nick") twin-engined heavy fighter flying reconnaissance at 25,000 feet (7,600 m), but the "Nick" began climbing higher. Two of the FG-1D Corsairs ceased their pursuit at 36,000 feet (11,000 m), but Marine Captain Kenneth Reusser and his wingman Klingman continued to 38,000 feet (12,000 m), expending most of their .50 caliber ammunition to lighten their aircraft. Reusser scored hits on the "Nick's" port engine, but ran out of ammunition, and was under fire from the Japanese rear gunner. Klingman lined up for a shot at a distance of 50 feet (15 m) when his guns jammed due to the extreme cold. He approached the "Nick" three times to damage it with his propeller, chopping away at his opponent's rudder, rear cockpit, and right stabilizer. The Toryu spun down to 15,000 feet (4,600 m) where its wings came off. Despite missing five inches (13 cm) from the ends of his propeller blades, running out of fuel and having an aircraft dented and punctured by debris and bullets, Klingman safely guided his Corsair to a deadstick landing. He was awarded the Navy Cross.

=== Cold War ===
In the 1960 U-2 incident, Soviet pilot Igor Mentyukov was scrambled with orders to ram the intruding Lockheed U-2, using his unarmed Sukhoi Su-9 which had been modified for higher altitude flight. In 1996, Mentyukov claimed that contact with his aircraft's slipstream downed Francis Gary Powers; however, Sergei Khrushchev asserted in 2000 that Mentyukov failed even to gain visual contact.

On 7 September 1965, during the 1965 Indo-Pakistani War, a Pakistani Lockheed F-104A Starfighter (Serial No. 56-877) from the No. 9 Squadron "Griffins" which was piloted by Flight Lieutenant Amjad Hussain Khan intercepted 6 Indian Mystere IVs which were attacking Sargodha Airbase. In the ensuing dogfight, a Mystere flown by Squadron Leader Devaiah forced Amjad's F-104 into low-speed dogfighting (something which the F-104 performs badly in due to its poor maneuverability at reduced speeds). Though Amjad scored several hits on Devaiah's Mystere with his M-61 Vulcan and even fired a GAR-8 at it (which missed), the Mystere was still flying. Amjad ultimately made the first jet-to-jet ramming attack against the Indian warplane. This led to both pilots losing control of their aircraft over Kot Nakka. While the Indian pilot perished with his warplane, Amjad managed to eject safely and was rescued by Pakistani villagers watching the intense dogfight.

On 18 July 1981 Captain V.A. Kulyapin reportedly used his Su-15 to ram a chartered Argentine CL-44 during the 1981 Armenia mid-air collision, although Western experts believed this likely to have been a self-serving interpretation of an accidental collision.

A 1986 RAND Corporation study concluded that the ramming attack was still a viable option for modern jets defending their airspace from long-range bombers if those bombers were carrying atomic weapons. The study posited that defending fighters might expend their weapons without downing the enemy bomber, and the pilots would then be faced with the final choice of ramming—almost certainly trading their lives for the many who would be killed by a successful nuclear attack.

=== After 1990 ===
During the April 2001 Hainan island incident, an American EP-3 SIGINT aircraft was rammed by a Chinese PLANAF J-8 interceptor.

During the 9/11 attacks in 2001, F-16 fighter jets were dispatched to intercept the hijacked United Airlines Flight 93, believed to be heading to Washington. However, there was no time for the combat jets to be armed with missiles. The pilots, Marc H. Sasseville and Heather Penney, understood that they would be ramming the aircraft. The plane had already crashed due to an internal struggle by the time the jets arrived.

=== Russo-Ukrainian War ===
Numerous instances of Ukrainian Ground Forces drones being used for aerial ramming have been recorded; this includes an instance where a Russian DJI Mavic Pro Drone was destroyed in an aerial ramming with a Ukrainian drone on 3 October 2022, and an incident in July 2024 where an FPV drone with a stick mounted to it was used to attack and eventually destroy a ZALA 421-16E reconnaissance drone by repeatedly ramming it.

== See also ==
- Index of aviation articles
- Mid-air collision
