= Armed Forces Karting Championship =

British Armed Forces KartingC

- Category: Kart racing
- Country: United Kingdom
- Inaugural season: 2011
- Classes: Premier, Endurance
- Official website: rafmsa.co.uk

Armed Forces Karting Championship (AFKC) Logo Formally called Inter-Service karting Championship.

The Armed Forces Karting Championship (AFKC), formerly the Inter-Service Kart Championship and the RAF Kart Championship, is a karting competition run for teams and drivers serving in or otherwise associated with the RAF, Royal Navy and British Army. It was first staged in 2011, evolving out of the RAF competitions that had been staged for many years but which had long welcomed karters from the other services.

== History ==
The Championship is normally held over 6 or 7 rounds between April and September each year and runs two classes of racing, which are usually both run during a race weekend. All events are run by the RAFMSA with the RNRMMSA and BAMA under the jurisdiction of Motorsport UK.

The Premier Class is for high-performance karts with two-stroke engines up to 125 cc. Various engines may be used, including KF2, Rotax FR125, Parilla Leopard, PRD Fireball, IAME EasyKart 125, TKM BT82, TKM K4S and Parilla Lynx/Lynx Maxi, as well as the classic 100cc. Racing is on an individual basis, with each event usually consisting of three qualifying heats (around 10 minutes each), followed by a slightly longer final (around 12 minutes). There are two championship categories: ‘Serving Military’ for serving military personnel, and 'Overall' for all drivers. The Wally Pape Trophy is awarded to the best novice during the season, whilst the RAF Individual Kart Championship for serving RAF personnel is also contested at a nominated round.

The Endurance Class is for twin-engine Honda GX-160-powered Pro-Karts and is where most new drivers start. Races are usually between two and three hours in duration, and involve teams representing stations, units, and other formations. There are two championship categories: 'Serving Military' for teams entered by station and unit clubs, and 'Overall' for all teams. A Station/Unit Trophy is also contested between station and unit clubs.

== Endurance Champions Winners ==
Year	Military Champion	Overall Champion	Station/Unit Trophy	Inter-Service Cup	Super Catagory
RAF Kart Championship					
2009	(United Kingdom) RAF Brize Norton Boyz	Red Bull Asylum Seekers			
2010	(United Kingdom) RAF Cosford Catchups	Silver Fox Racing	(United Kingdom) RAF Cosford		
Inter-Service Kart Championship					
2011	(United Kingdom) RAF Brize Norton Morts	JIZM Racing I	(United Kingdom) RAF Brize Norton		
2012	(United Kingdom) Army Karting I	Silver Fox Racing	(United Kingdom) Army Karting		
2013	(United Kingdom) RAF Odiham Morts	Silver Fox Racing	(United Kingdom) RAF Marham		
2014	(United Kingdom) RAF Marham Blue Bulls I	Silver Fox Racing	(United Kingdom) RAF Digby		
2015	(United Kingdom) MOD St Athan Morts	Silver Fox Racing	(United Kingdom) Army Karting		
2016	(United Kingdom) RAF Marham Blue Bulls I	Silver Fox Racing	(United Kingdom) RAF Marham	(United Kingdom) Royal Air Force	
2017	(United Kingdom) RAF Marham Blue Bulls I	(United Kingdom) RAF Marham Blue Bulls I	(United Kingdom) RAF Waddington	(United Kingdom) Royal Air Force	
2018	(United Kingdom) RAF Marham Blue Bulls I	SWKC Racing	(United Kingdom) RAF Marham	(United Kingdom) Royal Air Force	
2019	(United Kingdom) RAF Marham Blue Bulls I	(United Kingdom) RAF Marham Blue Bulls I	(United Kingdom) RAF Marham	(United Kingdom) Royal Air Force	(United Kingdom) RAF Brize Norton Knights I
Armed Forces Karting Championship					
2020	Not held due to the COVID-19 pandemic				
2021	(United Kingdom) RAF Marham Blue Bulls II	Monkey Motorsport	(United Kingdom) RAF Waddington	(United Kingdom) Royal Navy	(United Kingdom) Royal Navy I
2022	(United Kingdom) RAF Brize Norton Knights I	Wraith Racing I	(United Kingdom) RAF Waddington	(United Kingdom) Royal Air Force	REME Corps No.6
2023	(United Kingdom) Fleet Air Arm I	Monkey Motorsport II	(United Kingdom) Fleet Air Arm	(United Kingdom) British Army	REME Corps No.6
2024	(United Kingdom) Fleet Air Arm II	7Kart	(United Kingdom) Fleet Air Arm	(United Kingdom) Royal Navy	REME Corps No.6
2025	(United Kingdom) Fleet Air Arm II	7Kart	(United Kingdom) Fleet Air Arm	(United Kingdom) Royal Navy	(United Kingdom) Royal Navy General Service l
2026	(United Kingdom) Fleet Air Arm II	7Kart	(United Kingdom) Fleet Air Arm	(United Kingdom) Royal Navy	(United Kingdom) Army Karting III

== Endurance Season Review (2022-2026) ==
=== 2022 Season ===
The 2022 Armed Forces Karting season was contested over 6 closely fought rounds. This 6-stage calendar put the new civilian teams and military teams to the ultimate test across various circuits, challenging both driver and team strategy throughout the year.

2022 Season Open at Whilton Mill Kart Track with RAF Brize Norton 73 and GKD Racing locking out the front row, RAF Brize Norton going to take the Military title, while GKD Racing taking 2nd in Overall standings after 'switchgate'.

The 2022 Armed Forces Karting season marked a historic turning point for the championship as association teams, civilian manufacturers, and independent engine builders formally joined the grid. This influx of civilian expertise allowed teams to establish strategic alliances and construct dedicated racing operations, dramatically elevating the competitive standard of the series.

Waddington 53 leading GKD Racing 33 and Brize Norton 71. Waddington had a great with all four entries competing for top spot at some point with heated rival RAF Brize Norton.

This season also marked a major technical shift with a mid-season tyre switch from Bridgestone to Yokohama tyres starting from the Clay Pigeon round, bringing an end to the exclusive use of Bridgestone tyres, which had been the championship standard since 2011.

The battle for the Military Championship culminated in a historic resurgence for RAF Brize Norton No. 73, who captured their first military title since 2011. They were followed closely by RAF Waddington No. 50 in second place, with RN Fleet Air Arm No. 45 completing the podium in third.

RAF Brize Norton fighting for Overall Win with Wraith Racing at Clay Raceway who went on to win the overall and Brize No.73 coming first Military in Race 3.

Throughout the season, REME Corps No. 6 proved to be the class of the field, delivering a dominant campaign to secure the Super Category title in convincing fashion. Their pace and consistency were such that they won the category and achieved an impressive 9th place overall against the full championship field. RN Fleet Air Arm III secured second place in the standings, while Army Air Corps I completed the podium in third, underlining the strong level of competition within the category despite REME Corps No. 6's commanding performance.

Royal Navy Racing 45 at Lydd Kart Circuit taking the military double that weekend. Royal Navy No.45 showed to be one of the fastest with Brize No.73 but sadly missing out, but it was a start of something truly special in the years to come.

In the Overall Championship, civilian teams set the benchmark as Wraith Racing claimed the absolute title. GKD Racing secured the runner-up spot following the final round, which was heavily disrupted by a controversial event widely known as 'Switchgate'. Capitalising on the late-season drama, the military class winners RAF Brize Norton No. 73 claimed a highly impressive third place in the overall standings.

The fight for the Station / Unit Trophy provided the closest finish of the year. RAF Waddington ultimately clinched the title, but they were pushed to the absolute limit in a tense three-way title race that left RAF Waddington, the RN Fleet Air Arm, and RAF Brize Norton separated by a mere 3 points at the season's conclusion. To cap off the year, the Royal Air Force took main honours in the Inter-Service Cup to cement their dominance across the military classes.

==== 2022 season results ====
Top 3 From Each Class
Championship Category	Winner	Runner-Up	Third Place
Military Championship	RAF Brize Norton No.73 (Wright chassis)	RAF Waddington No.50 (7kart)	RN Fleet Air Arm No.45 (Wright/7kart)
Overall Championship	Wraith Racing (Wright/Wraith chassis)	GKD Motorsport (7kart)	RAF Brize Norton No.73 (Wright)
Station/Unit Trophy	RAF Waddington	RN Fleet Air Arm	RAF Brize Norton
Super Category Championship	REME Corps No.6 (Wright)	RN Fleet Air Arm III (Wright)	Army Air Corps I (7kart)
Inter-Service Cup	Royal Air Froce	RN Fleet Air Arms	Army

=== 2023 Season ===
The 2023 season of the Armed Forces Karting Championship Endurance Class was contested over 7 rounds, featuring a welcome return to Scotland at the Boyndie Drome kart track, alongside circuits spanning all the way down to the southern end of the country at Clay Pigeon Raceway.

Led by Kart No. 45, the Royal Navy and Royal Marines Kart Team delivered a dominant campaign, securing their first Armed Forces Karting Championship title and achieving an impressive 1-2 finish in the championship standings.

Brize Norton No. 71 shows respect following a hard-fought battle on track. Unfortunately, the RAF Brize Norton Kart Team were unable to replicate their success from the previous season, with a combination of mechanical issues and the departure of several drivers during the campaign affecting their championship challenge. Coupled with the regular turnover of personnel inherent within RAF postings, rebuilding a title-contending squad would prove a significant challenge, and it could be some time before another RAF team mounted a sustained challenge for the championship's top honours.

The battle for the Serving Military Endurance Championship was highly competitive, culminating in an incredibly close multi-team showdown at the final round. Four karts remained in mathematical contention to secure the title at the Shenington Kart Circuit finale in October: the RAF Brize Norton Knights entries, Knights 73 2022 champions and Knights 71, and the RN Fleet Air Arm entries, RN Fleet Air Arm 45 and RN Fleet Air Arm 46.

Ultimately, RN Fleet Air Arm 45 emerged victorious to take the championship title, while their teammates in RN Fleet Air Arm 46 secured the runner-up spot. This historic result marked the first time a single team secured a 1-2 finish in the military standings since RAF Marham achieved back-to-back 1-2 finishes in 2018 and 2019. The milestone achievement was attributed to the exceptional performance of the team's personnel and management, alongside a highly successful technical alliance with 7kart, whose chassis were utilized for the first time throughout the season.

Monkey Motorsport had a great season taking number of overall victories at the start of season and with consistent result taking home the Overall title for the second time.

In the absolute Overall Endurance Championship, Monkey Motorsport 63 claimed the top step of the podium. They were pushed closely all year by GKD Racing, their nearest championship rivals. Despite delivering a dominant performance at the final round, GKD Racing was unable to overhaul Monkey Motorsport 63 in the final overall standings.

The RN Fleet Air Arm successfully retained the Station/Unit Trophy, securing the title by a significant margin over the runner-up REME Kart Team compared to last Season, while the RAF Brize Norton Knights completed the podium in third place.

REME Kart No.6 had a another great season taking a number of victories including also for the first half of the season leading the military points standings.

REME Corps No. 6 defended their crown to become back-to-back Super Category Champions, with a continuous campaign throughout the season. RAF Leeming No. 21 finished as runners-up after a good start to the year, highlighted by an overall race victory. However, a series of reliability issues throughout the remainder of the season prevented them from mounting a sustained title challenge. Army Air Corps I secured third place in the championship, with good consistency and several drives enabling them to once again claim a spot on the Super Category podium.

Lastly, the Inter-Service Cup was won by the Army for the first time in championship history. The expansion and performance of new teams, such as the RLC Kart Team, significantly bolstered the Army's collective points haul. The RN Fleet Air Arm finished as runners-up in the Inter-Service standings, with the Royal Air Force rounding out the top three.

==== 2023 season results ====
Top 3 From Each Class
Championship Category	Winner	Runner-Up	Third Place
Military Championship	RN Fleet Air Arm No.45 (7kart)	RN Fleet Air Arm No.46 (7kart)	RAF Brize Norton No.73 (Wright chassis)
Overall Championship	Monkey Motorsport II (7kart)	GKD Motorsport (7kart)	Alessia Prime (7kart)
Super Category Championship	REME Corps No.6 (Wright)	RAF Leeming (Hasse)	Army Air Corps I (7kart)
Station/Unit Trophy	RN Fleet Air Arm	REME Corps	RAF Brize Norton
Inter-Service Cup	British Army	Royal Navy	Royal Air Force

=== 2024 Season ===
The 2024 Armed Forces Karting Championship featured a seven-round calendar and introduced a completely revised event structure. Replacing the previous race format, competitors now had to qualify through a Semi-Final stage, with the results determining progression into either the A Final or B Final. The new system increased the importance of consistency across the entire race meeting and created greater depth throughout the field, ensuring competitive battles existed from the front of the grid to the midfield. The introduction of the A and B Finals marked one of the most significant format changes in the championship.

Leading the pack at Rowrah, the Royal Navy set the pace while eventual race winners GKD Racing remained firmly in contention. GKD Racing equalled 7Kart's seven victories during the season, but despite their race-winning form, the championship title continued to elude them as they finished second overall for the third time. It was another impressive campaign, yet one that ended in frustration as they narrowly missed out on the ultimate prize.

The Military Championship was dominated by the Royal Navy, who continued the momentum built over the previous two seasons with an outstanding campaign. Between RN Fleet Air Arm No. 45 and RN Fleet Air Arm No. 46 who became military champions, the Royal Navy secured 13 victories from the 14 races they entered, including an incredible seven 1-2 finishes throughout the year. Their pace was not only enough to lock out the top two positions in the Military Championship, but also to challenge the leading civilian teams in the Overall Championship. Highlights included a superb overall victory at Bayford Meadows along with multiple overall podium finishes, helping No. 45 and No. 46 secure 4th and 6th places overall respectively. Their closest competition came from REME Corps No. 3, who consistently challenged the Royal Navy frontrunners and claimed several military class victories during the season.

7Kart secured the overall championship title. Perhaps even more importantly, the presence of a kart manufacturer within the championship demonstrated just how far the Armed Forces Karting Championship had progressed. What began as a service motorsport competition had evolved into a highly professional and respected championship, capable of attracting interest and participation from established figures like Apollo, MS etc within the wider karting industry.

In the Overall Championship, 7Kart No. 25 emerged victorious following a season-long battle with GKD Motorsport. The two teams proved to be the class of the field, sharing all 14 overall race victories between them with seven wins apiece. Despite another determined championship challenge, GKD Motorsport were ultimately forced to settle for the runner-up position. Monkey Motorsport II, the reigning champions, completed the championship podium in third after a strong campaign with a different chassis, although they were unable to consistently match the outright pace of the leading duo.

REME Corps No. 6 make history by securing a third consecutive title. Their achievement cemented their position as the most successful team in the history of the Super Category since its introduction in 2019. Finishing second was RAF Wyton II, who enjoyed an impressive debut season and quickly established themselves as one of the category's leading teams. REME Corps No. 5 completed the championship podium in third, adding further success for the Corps in what was another highly competitive year for the Super Category.

REME Kart Team No.6 shows they the team to beat in the Super Category taking they third title in history making them the clear No.1.

The Station / Unit Trophy was once again claimed by the Royal Navy, whose dominant performances throughout the season secured the award for the second consecutive year. REME Corps followed in second place after another consistently strong campaign, while RAF Brize Norton completed the podium in third. Notably, the final standings mirrored those of the previous season, highlighting the continued strength and stability of the championship's leading military organisations.

In the Inter-Service Cup, the Royal Navy continued their season by capturing the title for the second time, adding to their first triumph in 2021. Their depth of talent and sustained success across the championship proved decisive as they finished ahead of the British Army in second place and the Royal Air Force in third. The victory further cemented the Royal Navy's status as the dominant military force of the 2024 season.

==== 2024 season results ====
Top 3 From Each Class
Championship Category	Winner	Runner-Up	Third Place
Military Championship	RN Fleet Air Arm No.46 (7kart)	RN Fleet Air Arm No.45 (7kart)	REME Corps No.3 (Wright)
Overall Championship	7kart (7kart)	GKD Motorsport (7kart)	Monkey Motorsport II (Wright/Wraith chassis)
Super Category Championship	REME Corps No.6 (Wright)	RAF Wyton II (7kart)	REME Corps No.5 (Wright)
Station/Unit Trophy	RN Fleet Air Arm	REME Corps	RAF Brize Norton
Inter-Service Cup	Royal Navy	British Army	Royal Air Force

=== 2025 Season ===
The 2025 Armed Forces Karting Championship was contested over seven rounds, with the calendar featuring several notable changes. Llandow became a unique double-header venue, hosting both the opening and closing rounds of the season, while Crail made a welcome return to the championship for the first time since 2018. The season also saw a significant technical change as the championship transitioned from Yokohama to MRF tyres following the end of Yokohama tyre production. However, due to concerns regarding the compound's suitability for endurance competition, the MRF tyre would remain in use for only this season.

Starting Grid of the A Finial at Fulbeck kart circuit this became a common sight with 7kart No.25 and Royal Navy No.46 locking out the front row with 7kart taking the record for most poles in a season.

RAF Marham No.39 was Royal Navy No.46 closest rival even if no.46 had a gap No.39 dropped out the championship top 3 after a DNQ at Rowrah then not doing the finial Round of the championship resulting in RAF coming last in the inter-service title.

In the Military Championship, the Royal Navy and Royal Marines No. 46 continued their recent dominance, securing eight military class victories and an impressive three overall race wins throughout the campaign. Their exceptional performances resulted in a remarkable second place overall in the championship, beaten only by the chassis manufacturer team (7kart). Finishing second in the military standings was Army Kart Team No. 2, who recovered from a challenging start to produce one of their strongest seasons in recent memory. A superb second half of the year culminated in an overall victory at the final round of the season, securing a deserved runners-up position. Third place went to RAF Marham No. 39, who were among No. 46's closest challengers all year. However, a disqualification from Rowrah due to an illegal engine proved costly and ultimately ended their title hopes

Royal Navy No.46 leading the pack at Rowrah, another dominate season lead to they 2nd title for No.46 and 3rd for the team.

GKD switched to Apollo chassis this year after years of running 7kart and it looked to pay off but sadly only resulted in handful of overall wins that year including dropping behind military teams like Navy and Army on Pace.

The Overall Championship was dominated by 7Kart RPM, who produced one of the most commanding seasons in Armed Forces Karting history. The team established a new championship record by achieving ten consecutive race victories, a streak that began at Clay Pigeon in April and continued until the season finale at Llandow in October, only ending due to engine failure. Their campaign also included seven pole positions from nine events and two lap records, underlining their superiority throughout the year. Royal Navy and Royal Marines No. 46 secured an outstanding second place overall, representing one of the highest overall championship finishes by a military team since the 2021 season. Monkey Motorsport II completed the overall podium in third after another consistent campaign, claiming two overall victories and remaining regular contenders at the front of the field throughout the year.

7kart on course to win A Finial at Fulbeck, after difficult first round the team went on 10 win streak including new lap records In Prokart GX160 class making it the most dominate season in history.

Army Kart Team No.2 making their way around Crail after a difficult start of the season and getting used to a new chassis No.2 kart ended up producing one of they best seasons in a long time, with the support of a civil driver and possible one the fastest the championship has seen.

The Super Category Championship, contested at the increased minimum weight of 185kg, was won by Royal Navy and Royal Marines General Services No. 49. Despite appearing dominant for much of the season, their path to the title was far from straightforward, with a costly disqualification at Rowrah (illegal Helmet) ensuring the championship battle remained alive until the final rounds. Ultimately, No. 49 secured the title by just six points from Royal Logistic Corps No. 27, who consistently challenged at the front of the category all season long. Army Kart Team No. 1 completed the podium in third, marking their first-ever top three finish in the Super Category standings. The Station / Unit Trophy was comprehensively won by the Royal Navy, whose depth of performance across multiple teams delivered one of the most dominant displays in the trophy's history. They finished more than 110 points clear of their nearest rivals, establishing the largest winning margin ever recorded in the championship. Army Kart Team secured second place, matching their best result since the 2019 season, while RAF Marham completed the podium in third and recorded their best finish in the competition since 2021.

Royal Navy No.49 taking the Super Class title with a dominate victory but it wasn't as straight forward as you think.....

In the Inter-Service Cup, the Royal Navy successfully defended their title to claim the award for the second consecutive season. The British Army finished as runners-up, while the Royal Air Force completed the standings in third place.

==== 2025 season results ====
Top 3 From Each Class
Championship Category	Winner	Runner-Up	Third Place
Military Championship	RN Fleet Air Arm No.46 (7kart)	Army Karting II (7kart)	RAF Marham No.39 (apollo)
Overall Championship	7kart (7kart)	RN Fleet Air Arm No.46 (7kart)	Monkey Motorsport II (7kart)
Super Category Championship	RN Fleet Air Arm No.49 (7kart)	Royal Logistic Corps No. 27 (Wraith/Wright chassis)	Army Karting I (MS kart)
Station/Unit Trophy	RN Fleet Air Arm	Army Karting	RAF Marham
Inter-Service Cup	Royal Navy	British Army	Royal Air Force

=== 2026 Season ===
The 2026 Armed Forces Karting Championship was contested over seven rounds then six rounds, featuring the introduction of Forest Edge to the championship calendar but due to safety was sadly cancelled and the welcome return of Whilton Mill for the season finale, marking its first appearance since hosting the opening round of the 2022 season. Llandow once again opened the campaign, continuing its status as one of the championship's most established venues. While the regulations remained largely unchanged, the season saw the introduction of Maxxis EVO tyres, replacing the short-lived MRF tyre and providing competitors with improved consistency and performance. The championship also returned to a three-race format at each round, with teams racing in two of them, while the title-deciding finale retained the Semi-Final and A Final format to ensure a level playing field amongst championship contenders.

Royal Navy No.46 crossing the line to take the title at Whilton Mill they 4th in a row another record breaking year.

Away from the circuit, increasing attention was focused on the long-term development of the regulations. Championship officials gathered data throughout the season to assess potential future rule changes like fix gearing for next season, including measures aimed at controlling costs and preserving the military identity of teams through a review of regulations regarding civilian participation within military entries.

Royal Navy Driver No.46 celebrating Victory after securing the Military title one round early at Rowrah.

The Military Championship was once again dominated by Royal Navy and Royal Marines No. 46, who delivered one of the most impressive campaigns in recent history. The team secured nine victories from twelve races, alongside four outright overall wins and an outstanding ten overall podium finishes. Their relentless consistency allowed them to challenge the factory-backed teams throughout the season and ultimately secure the Military Championship by more than 100 points, wrapping up the title before the final meeting of the year.

RAF Waddington Kart Team No.150 celebrating after taking they first overall victory of the Season.

RAF Waddington Vulcans No. 150 finished second in the championship, marking a welcome return to form for one of the series' most historic teams. After several years away from the sharp end of the standings, the team rediscovered its competitiveness and was rewarded with a popular overall and military class victory at Crail, one of the highlights of their campaign. The resurgence of the Waddington setup was further reinforced by the performances of sister team RAF Waddington Vulcans No. 51, who secured an impressive overall victory at Fulbeck in challenging mixed wet and dry conditions.

Completing the Military Championship podium was Royal Navy and Royal Marines No. 45, who enjoyed a superb season and remained firmly in contention for second place throughout much of the year. A retirement at Rowrah ultimately proved costly in the championship battle, but their performances highlighted the exceptional depth of talent within the Royal Navy squad, with all three Navy entries regularly competing for military podiums, victories, and strong overall results.

In the Overall Championship, 7Kart RPM once again emerged victorious after another exceptional season, claiming nine victories from twelve races Overall and establishing themselves as the benchmark team in the championship. However, the title fight was far from straightforward, with Royal Navy and Royal Marines No. 46 consistently matching their pace and challenging for victory at virtually every round.

7kart taking the A finial victory and AFKC Overall championship after an record breaking drive after an DNQ in they semi-finial race.

The defining moment of the season came at the championship finale when 7Kart RPM were disqualified from the Semi-Final due to an incorrect engine serial number being registered on Alpha Timing. Forced to start from the back of the B Final, the team the furthest comeback drive in championship history, gaining an estimated 55 positions across the B Final and A Final before taking victory in the feature race by over 20 seconds. The result secured both the race win and the championship title. Despite suffering a mechanical issue in the final race, Royal Navy and Royal Marines No. 46 comfortably secured second place overall, having built a substantial advantage over their nearest rivals throughout the season.

Completing the Overall Championship podium was the popular Marriage Counselling No. 84 team, who enjoyed the strongest season in their history. Consistently running at the front of the field, they regularly challenged the championship's leading contenders and produced several standout performances across the six-round campaign. Their success, combined with their continued support of championship officials and personnel at events throughout the year, made them one of the most respected and well-supported teams in the paddock.

Army Kart team No.7 on the way to they 5th Super class victory and the class title.

The Super Category Championship, contested at the increased minimum weight of 185kg, produced one of the closest and most fiercely contested title battles in the history of the category. As the championship arrived at the final round, Army Kart Team No. 1 and RAF Leeming No. 121 were tied on points, while Army Kart Team No. 7 remained firmly in contention just five points behind.

The championship battle was further intensified by accusations from a rival team concerning engine legality and compliance with technical regulations, creating considerable discussion throughout the paddock during the closing stages of the season. However, all competing engines were subjected to detailed inspections by championship officials and experienced scrutineers, with every engine subsequently passing the required checks and being deemed fully compliant with the regulations. Questions were also raised regarding driver eligibility and the competitiveness of differing race groups, adding further intrigue to an already closely fought championship battle.

RAF Waddington No.51 taking overall victory in the last race of the day at Fulbeck showing that the team is back at the front!

The tension continued into the season finale. In one Semi-Final, RAF Leeming No. 121 struck the first blow by taking victory, while Army Kart Team No. 7 remained firmly in contention by securing third place, just 4.3 seconds behind. In the other Semi-Final, Army Kart Team No. 1 claimed the Super Category honours and appeared well positioned heading into the decisive race.

Royal Navy No.46 leading the pack this became a common sight for all of 2026 season and since 2023.

However, the championship would ultimately be decided in dramatic fashion during the final race of the season. Army Kart Team No. 7 delivered a championship-winning performance, securing victory in the class when it mattered most and overturning the points deficit to claim the title. RAF Leeming No. 121 suffered a costly setback when an engine switch failed, forcing the team to carry out a replacement and resulting in an extended pit stop that dropped them out of contention for victory. Despite recovering to finish third in class, the lost time proved decisive in the championship battle, leaving them as runners-up. Army Kart Team No. 1, unable to match the pace of their rivals in the decisive stages of the event, completed the championship podium in third place after narrowly missing out on the title.

The Station / Unit Trophy was once again dominated by the Royal Navy, who continued their remarkable run of success by comfortably retaining the title. In doing so, they surpassed their own previous record-winning margin, finishing more than 100 points clear of their nearest challengers. Second place went to the RAF Waddington Vulcans, whose investment in equipment, including chassis and engine, helped produce a highly competitive campaign and a welcome return to the championship's leading positions for the first time since their teams' championship-winning season in 2022. Completing the podium in third was the Army Kart Team, who demonstrated impressive consistency throughout the year and secured a second consecutive top-three finish in the championship standings.

Royal Navy No.48 leading Monkey Motorsport No.63 who had a different line up for 2026 and RAF Benson No.90 following behind.

In the Inter-Service Cup, the Royal Navy successfully defended their title to claim the award for a third consecutive season. The British Army finished as runners-up, while the Royal Air Force completed the standings in third place. The result further underlined the Royal Navy's dominance throughout the 2026 campaign and extended one of the most successful periods by a single service in Armed Forces Karting history.

==== 2026 Season Results ====
Top 3 From Each Class
Championship Category	Winner	Runner-Up	Third Place
Military Championship	RN Fleet Air Arm No.46 (7kart)	RAF Waddington No.150 (Apollo)	RN Fleet Air Arm No.45 (7kart)
Overall Championship	7kart (7kart)	RN Fleet Air Arm No.46 (7kart)	Marriage Counselling No.84 (Wraith)
Super Category Championship	Army Karting No.7 (7kart)	RAF Leeming Kart Team (apollo)	Army Karting No.1 (MS kart)
Station/Unit Trophy	RN Fleet Air Arm	RAF Waddington	Army Kart Team
Inter-Service Cup	Royal Navy	British Army	Royal Air Force

== Teams Honour list ==
RAF Marham Team No.40 leading they team mate to another victory and another title during they most dominate period of 2010s setting the standard for everyone.

Military titles
Military Teams	No of titles
RAF Marham	6 (2014,2016-2019,2021)
RNRM Fleet Air Arms	4 (2023-2026)
RAF Brize Norton	3 (2009,2011, 2022)
RAF Cosford	1 (2010)
Army Kart Team	1 (2012)
RAF Odiham	1 (2013)
MOD St Athans	1 (2015)

Sliver Fox Racing No.96 looking back at the pack to take another victory and a record breaking title making them the most successful team in the history of the championship taking 5 Overall titles and helping military teams like REME over the years and the championship.

Overall titles
Military/Civ Teams	No of titles
Sliver Fox Racing	5 (2012-2016)
7Kart	3 (2024-2026)
RAF Marham	2 (2017,2019)
Monkey Motorsport	2 (2021,2023)
Red Bull Asylum Seekers	1 (2009)
JIZM Racing	1 (2011)
SWKC	1 (2018)
Wraith Racing	1 (2022)

Royal Navy Kart team in formation showing they domination with 4 in a row station/Unit trophies titles going level with RAF Marham.

Station/Unit Trophy titles
Military Teams	No of titles
RAF Marham	4 (2013,2016,2018-2019)
RNRM Fleet Air Arm	4 (2023-2026)
RAF Waddington	3 (2017,2021-2022)
Army Karting	2 (2012,2015)
RAF Cosford	1 (2010)
RAF Brize Norton	1 (2011)
RAF Digby	1 (2014)

The REME quickly established themselves as the team to beat, setting the benchmark for success by securing three consecutive championship titles.

Super Category titles
Military Teams	No of titles
REME Corps	3 (2022-2024)
RNRM Gen/Fleet Air Arms	2 (2021,2025)
RAF Brize Norton	1 (2019)
Army Kart Team	1 (2026)

== Hall of Fame ==
Why Establish an Armed Forces Karting Hall of Fame?

To Preserve the Championship's Heritage

The Hall of Fame would safeguard the history of Armed Forces Karting, recording the achievements, milestones, and stories that have shaped the championship since its foundation. By preserving its history, future competitors and supporters can better understand how the championship has evolved and the individuals who helped build it.

To Recognise Outstanding Service and Achievement

The Hall of Fame would provide a lasting honour for drivers, teams, officials, volunteers, and supporters who have made exceptional contributions to the championship. Whether through competitive success, long-term dedication, or commitment behind the scenes, inductees would be recognised for the significant impact they have had on Armed Forces Karting.

To Inspire Future Generations

By celebrating the achievements of past and present members, the Hall of Fame would encourage future competitors, volunteers, and organisers to continue raising standards within the championship. It would showcase examples of excellence, teamwork, sportsmanship, and dedication that embody the spirit of Armed Forces Karting.

To Strengthen the Armed Forces Karting Community

The Hall of Fame would bring together current and former competitors, officials, supporters, and military units. By recognizing past achievements and preserving records, it would support camaraderie within the championship.

=== Hall of Fame List ===
Coming soon

- Official website
