= Ray Holmes =

Royal Air Force officer

Flight Lieutenant Ray Holmes
- Born: 20 August 1914; Wallasey, Cheshire, England
- Died: 27 June 2005 (aged 90); Hoylake, Merseyside, England
- Spouses: Elizabeth Holmes (née Killip) (m. 1941; died 1964) Anne Holmes (m. 1966)
- Military career
- Allegiance: United Kingdom
- Branch: Royal Air Force
- Service years: 1936–1945
- Rank: Flight Lieutenant
- Nickname: "Arty"
- Unit: No. 504 Squadron RAF
- Conflicts: World War II: Battle of Britain
- Other work: King's Messenger, journalist

Raymond Towers Holmes (20 August 1914 – 27 June 2005) was a British Royal Air Force fighter pilot during the Second World War who is best known for an event that occurred during the Battle of Britain, when he reportedly saved Buckingham Palace from being hit by German bombing by ramming his Hawker Hurricane into a Dornier Do 17 bomber over London. He was feted by the press as a war hero for saving the Palace. However, different versions of this event have been proposed. Holmes became a King's Messenger after the war, and died at the age of 90 in 2005.

== Early life ==
Raymond Towers Holmes was born on 20 August 1914 in Wallasey, Cheshire. He attended Wallasey and Calday Grange Grammar School and worked as a crime journalist at the Birkenhead Advertiser before joining the Royal Air Force Volunteer Reserve in 1936 as their 55th volunteer.

== Second World War ==
=== Battle of Britain ===
In June 1940 he joined No. 504 Squadron RAF. He became known among his flight comrades as "Arty" which was taken from the initials of his name R.T.

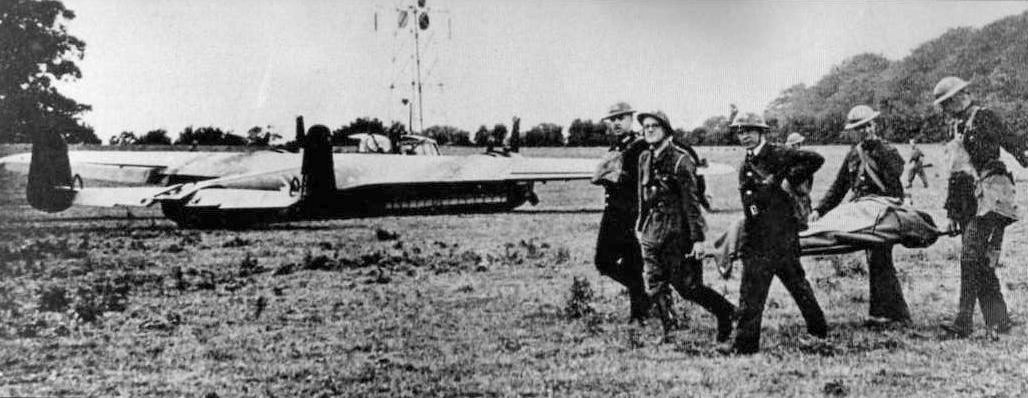
Rudolf Heitsch's Dornier Do 17 at Castle Farm, Shoreham. The flamethrower is just visible on the aft fuselage.

According to the now common account, on 15 September 1940, known as Battle of Britain Day, Sergeant Holmes was flying a Hawker Hurricane fighter when he spotted a formation of three Dornier Do 17 bombers of Kampfgeschwader 76 heading for central London, to make a bombing attempt. As he made an attack on one of the bombers, the bomber fired a flamethrower at him, and Holmes' windscreen was covered in oil.

The flamethrower, obviously intended for use on the ground, did not work as intended at 16,000 feet, producing a jet of flame only some 100 yards long. The oil did not catch fire, and instead covered Holmes' windshield. As the airflow cleared the oil away from his windscreen, Holmes saw that he was dangerously close to the Dornier, and ramming the stick forward, passed beneath the bomber.

I made my attack on this bomber and he spurted out a lot of oil, just a great stream over my aeroplane. blotting out my windscreen. I couldn't see a damn thing. Then, as the windscreen cleared, I suddenly found myself going straight into his tail. So I stuck my stick forward and went under him, practically grazing my head on his belly.

He attacked the second Dornier, causing a crew member to bail out.

I got to the stern of the aeroplane and was shooting at him when suddenly something white came out of the aircraft. I thought that a part of his wing had come away but in actual fact it turned out to be a man with a parachute coming out. I was travelling at 250 miles per hour, it all happened so quickly, but before I knew what had happened this bloody parachute was draped over my starboard wing. There was this poor devil on his parachute hanging straight out behind me, and my aeroplane was being dragged. All I could do was to swing the aeroplane left and then right to try to get rid of this man. Fortunately, his parachute slid off my wing and down he went, and I thought, Thank heavens for that!

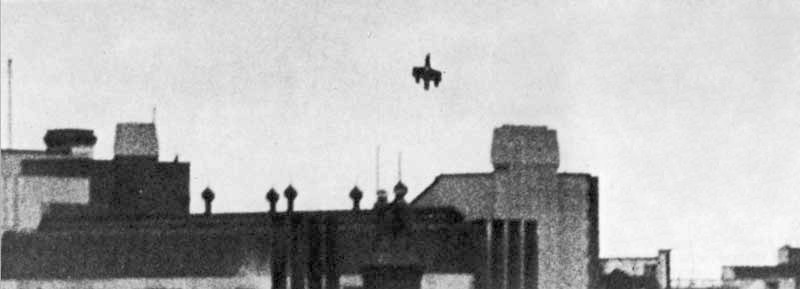
Zehbe's Dornier falling on Victoria Station after being rammed by Holmes.

Holmes then spotted the third Dornier apparently making directly for Buckingham Palace. Holmes quickly climbed ahead of it, to avoid any machine-gun fire, then swung around to make a head-on attack. However, he ran out of ammunition, so Holmes decided to ram the bomber.

As I fired, my ammunition gave out. I thought, Hell, he's got away now. And there he was coming along and his tail looked very fragile and very inviting. So I thought I'd just take off the tip of his tail. So I went straight at it along him and hit his port fin with my port wing. I thought, That will just take his fin off and he'll never get home without the tail fin. I didn't allow for the fact that the tail fin was actually part of the main fuselage. Although I didn't know it at the time, I found out later that I had knocked off the whole back half of the aircraft including the twin tails.

Holmes' plane began to dive to the left, and was no longer responding to the controls. As the Hurricane went into a vertical dive, he bailed out. As he climbed out, the air-stream caught him and smacked him down onto the roof of his Hurricane. Then, as he was thrown backward, his shoulder hit his own tail fin. When he finally managed to pull his ripcord, the jolt shook off his flying boots and he found himself swinging violently about. He watched the Dornier crash near Victoria tube station. Holmes landed in a narrow back garden, and ended up dangling inside an empty dustbin.

The Dornier pilot, Feldwebel Robert Zehbe, bailed out, only to die later reportedly of wounds suffered during the attack. The observer, Unteroffizier Hans Goschenhofer, and the gunner, Unteroffizier Gustav Hobel, were killed, while radio operator Gefreiter Ludwig Armbruster and flight engineer Unteroffizier Leo Hammermeister survived.

Holmes was feted by the press as a war hero for his saving of Buckingham Palace. As the RAF did not practise ramming as an air combat tactic, this was considered an impromptu manoeuvre, and an act of selfless courage. This event became one of the defining moments of the Battle of Britain and elicited a congratulatory note to the RAF from Queen Wilhelmina of the Netherlands, who had witnessed the event. The bomber's engine was later exhibited at the Imperial War Museum in London.

=== Later activities ===
When recovered, he became part of No 81 Squadron, and was sent to the Northern Front near Murmansk in Soviet Russia to help train the Russian air force in flying the Hawker Hurricane. Here he claimed a further kill; a Bf 109 F. He married Elizabeth Killip in April 1941 and was commissioned as a Pilot Officer on 10 June 1941, promoted to Flying Officer on 10 June 1942, and Flight Lieutenant on 10 June 1943.

Returning from Russia, Holmes served as an instructor with 2 FIS, Montrose, from 1942 until 1944. He then flew PR Spitfires with 541 Squadron from February 1945.

== Post-war ==
=== Personal life ===
After the war, he was a King's Messenger, personally delivering mail for Winston Churchill. After leaving the RAF in late 1945, he returned to journalism, joining his father's news agency covering Liverpool Crown Court for local and national newspapers.

He had two daughters with Elizabeth before she died in 1964. In 1966, he married Anne Holmes and went on to have a son and a daughter.

He provided eyewitness testimony of the Battle of Britain in the "Alone" episode of The World at War.

In 1989, he published his autobiography entitled Sky Spy: From Six Miles High to Hitler's Bunker.

Sixty-five years later, the wreckage of Holmes' Hurricane was discovered and excavated from the streets of London. The discovery was featured on the National Geographic Channel documentary, "The Search for the Lost Fighter Plane". Holmes also was mentioned in an episode of Battlefield Britain.

He was awarded the Freedom of the Borough of Wirral in January 2005.

He died on 27 June 2005, aged 90 at Hoylake Cottage Hospital after a two-year battle with cancer. He was buried in Rake Lane Cemetery, Wallasey.

The Second World War Experience Centre (SWWEC) holds an audio interview with Ray Holmes, the interview conducted by John Larder on 23 November 1996 - Interview 1857 - Length 3 hours.

== Postwar discussion of Holmes' attack ==
The story that Holmes deliberately crashed into the Dornier and that the German plane was attempting to bomb the palace has been challenged - notably by Alfred Price and Stephen Bungay. In one account, Zehbe developed engine trouble and lagged half a mile (800 metres) behind the main bomber stream. His Dornier attracted a swarm of fighters and was damaged. Goschenhofer and Hobel were killed before Zehbe and the others bailed out (Armbruster over Sydenham and Hammermeister over Dulwich). As Zehbe bailed out, he set the aircraft on autopilot. His Dornier was therefore unmanned when Holmes rammed it. During its spinning dive, the gravitational force on the Dornier caused its bombs to be released, which hit or landed near to the Palace nearby, damaging the building.

Holmes' combat report of the day makes no mention of an intended collision with the Dornier. It said he made four attacks on the Dornier. He saw a lone crewmember bail out as he made his third attack and, during the last pass, he felt a "jar" which caused his aircraft to fall into an uncontrollable spin, and that he first believed the Dornier exploded beneath him, before seeing it crash while he was on his parachute. Over the years, this apparent unintended "jar" seems to have been transformed into an intentional collision.

In the attack made by No.504 Squadron I attacked the right flank machine from quarter to astern. Pieces flew from the wings and a flame appeared in the port wing but went out again. After breaking away I climbed up to a single Do 215 and made two quarter attacks. Pieces flew off, my windscreen was now slashed with black oil. I attacked a third time and a member of the crew bailed out. On my fourth attack from the port beam a jar shook my starboard wing as I passed over the e/a and I went into an uncontrollable spin. I think the e/a must have exploded beneath me. I bailed out and as I landed I saw the Dornier hit the ground by Victoria Station, half a mile [800 metres] away.

Contrary to reports that Zehbe died of wounds suffered during the air attack, he may have been wounded by a civilian mob after landing near the Oval. He was rescued by the army before dying of his wounds the next day. Zehbe was buried in Brookwood Military Cemetery.

== See also ==
- The Few
