= Yekaterina Zelenko =

Soviet Air Force officer (1916–1941)

- Russian: Екатерина Ивановна Зеленко; Ukrainian: Катерина Іванівна Зеленко
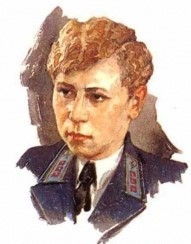
- Portrait from a 1983 Soviet envelope
- Born: 23 February [O.S. 10 February] 1916; Koroshchine, Ovruchsky Uyezd, Volhynian Governorate, Russian Empire
- Died: 12 September 1941 (aged 25); Sumy Oblast, Soviet Union
- Military career
- Allegiance: Soviet Union
- Branch: Soviet Air Force
- Service years: 1934 – 1941
- Rank: Senior Lieutenant
- Units: 11th Light Bomber Regiment; 135th Short-range Bomber Regiment
- Conflicts: World War II; Winter War; Eastern Front
- Awards: Hero of the Soviet Union; Order of the Red Banner

Yekaterina Ivanovna Zelenko (Russian: Екатерина Ивановна Зеленко, Ukrainian: Катерина Іванівна Зеленко; 23 February [O.S. 10 February] 1916 – 12 September 1941) was a Soviet Su-2 pilot who flew during the Winter War and World War II. She remains the only woman ever credited with conducting an aerial ramming, though many aviation historians question the credibility of such reports due to a lack of solid evidence.

== Early life ==
Zelenko was born in 1916 to a Russian family (Note: Some sources say that she was an ethnic Ukrainian, but her official award nomination says she was an ethnic Russian.) in the village of Koroshchine, then part of the Volhynian Governorate of the Russian Empire. She completed seven grades of school in Kursk before moving with her mother to Voronezh, where she entered the Voronezh Secondary Flying School. In October 1933 she graduated from the Voronezh Flying Club and was sent to the 3rd Orenburg Military Flying Academy named after Kliment Voroshilov.

In December 1934, she graduated with honors and was posted to Kharkiv on assignment to the 19th Light Bomber Brigade. From January 1936 until April 1938, she was assigned to the 14th Squadron of the Kharkov military district, after which she was assigned to the 4th Light Bomber Regiment, and from February to March 1940 she participated in the Soviet-Finnish War as a R-Zet pilot in the 11th Light Bomber Regiment. She flew eight missions during the conflict, for which she was awarded the Order of the Red Banner. (Note: Despite the popular misconception, Zelenko was not the only woman pilot of the Soviet Air Force who flew in the Winter War. For example, pilot Antonina Yefimovna Adaeva was awarded the Order of the Red Star for participating in the war.)

== World War II ==
On the eve of the German invasion of the Soviet Union Zelenko was an instructor pilot teaching other pilots to fly the Sukhoi Su-2. When the war started on 22 June 1941 she was flight commander in the 135th Short-range Bomber Aviation Regiment. From 5 July she flew combat missions in an Su-2 over Ukraine, for which she was thanked by the leadership of the 21st Army. For skillful work as a flight commander she was promoted to deputy squadron commander in August. On 12 September 1941 she took off for a reconnaissance mission from the Zerestovka airfield in an Su-2 with Nikolai Pavlyk as her aerial gunner. While returning from the mission she was attacked by at least two Messerschmitt Bf 109 fighters. One of the fighters chased after her squadron commander, Lebedev, leaving Zelenko alone. Her Su-2 was shot down by the enemy fighters. Pavlyk saw her slumped in the pilot's chair before bailing out of the plane. The Su-2 crashed near the village of Anastasyevka. Villagers found her identification documents. After Pavlyk returned to base he informed command that they were shot down and that Zelenko was either dead or badly wounded. He had not sought out the crash site for fear of being captured by the Germans. (Note: Sources on the number of Bf 109s she was attacked by varies, ranging from two to seven.)

Her husband Pavel Ignatenko died in an aviation accident in 1943.

== Aerial ramming controversy ==
According to the official version of events in her 1990 awarding of the title Hero of the Soviet Union, Zelenko's SU-2 was attacked by seven Bf 109s on 12 September 1941. After shooting down two she ran out of ammunition and rammed a Bf 109's a sliced off its tail with her propeller. Her cockpit broke up when the Su-2 exploded.

While it is undisputed that she flew 40 missions on the Su-2 and fought 12 aerial battles, many aviation historians from both Russia and elsewhere doubt the ramming story, pointing out that her first nomination for the title Hero of the Soviet Union did not mention a ramming. Claims about the location of the ramming, the location of her final resting place, and the evidence that was used to conclude that she conducted the ramming have been brought into question. For flying 40 missions she qualified for the title Hero of the Soviet Union, she was initially just awarded the Order of Lenin, likely because she was considered missing. In 1965 there was a petition to award her the title Hero of the Soviet Union for the ramming, but it was rejected due to a lack of evidence that it occurred. After the petition many journalists wrote about the ramming without providing evidence, resulting in later petitions suggesting she be awarded the title.

== Awards and recognition ==
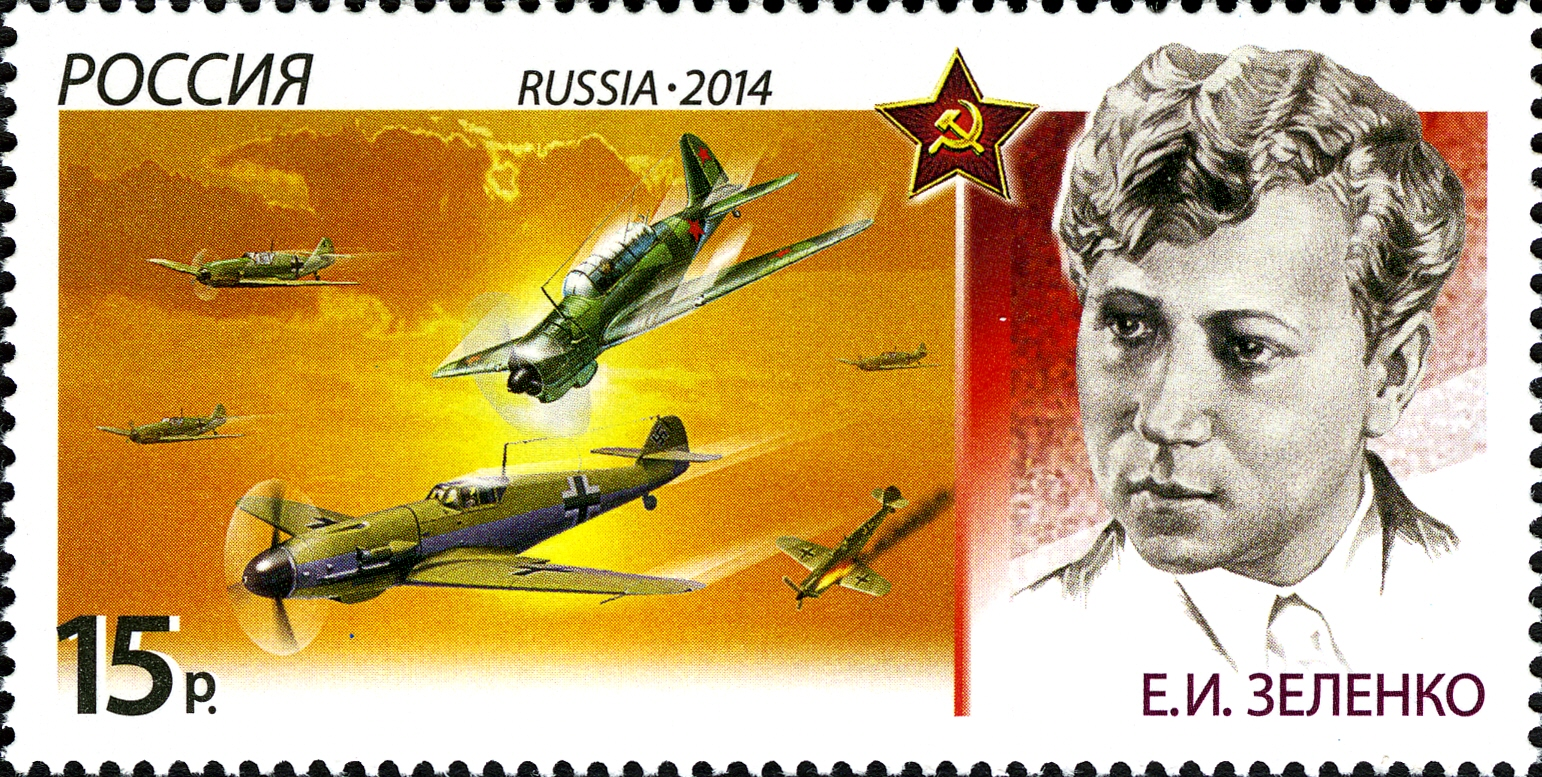
2014 Russian postage stamp depicting Zelenko and an aerial ramming credited to her

Awards

- Hero of the Soviet Union (5 May 1990)
- Two Orders of Lenin (29 December 1941 and 5 May 1990)
- Order of the Red Banner (19 May 1940)

Memorials and recognitions

- The minor planet 1900 Katyusha was named in her honor.
- Her portrait appeared on a Soviet envelope in 1983 before she was awarded the title Hero of the Soviet Union, and later on a 2014 postage stamp of the Russian Federation. (pictured)
- There are streets bearing her name as well as various monuments and statues in her honor throughout Russia and Ukraine.

== See also ==
- List of female Heroes of the Soviet Union
