= Pyotr Nesterov =

Russian aviator (1887–1914)

Pyotr Nikolayevich Nesterov
- Пётр Николаевич Нестеров
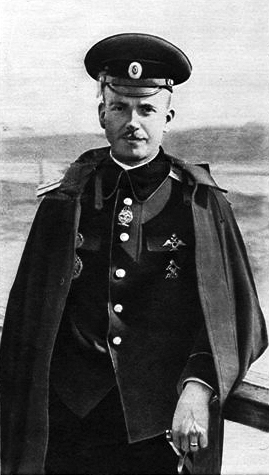
- Born: February 15, 1887; Nizhny Novgorod, Russian Empire
- Died: September 8, 1914 (aged 27); Żółkiew, Kingdom of Galicia and Lodomeria, Austria-Hungary (now Zhovkva, Ukraine)
- Military career
- Allegiance: Russian Empire
- Branch: Imperial Russian Army; Imperial Russian Air Service
- Service years: 1906—1914
- Rank: Stabskapitän
- Conflicts: First World War

Pyotr Nikolayevich Nesterov (Russian: Пётр Николаевич Нестеров; 27 February [O.S. 15 February] 1887 – 8 September [O.S. 26 August] 1914) was a Russian pilot, aircraft designer and aerobatics pioneer.

== Life and career ==
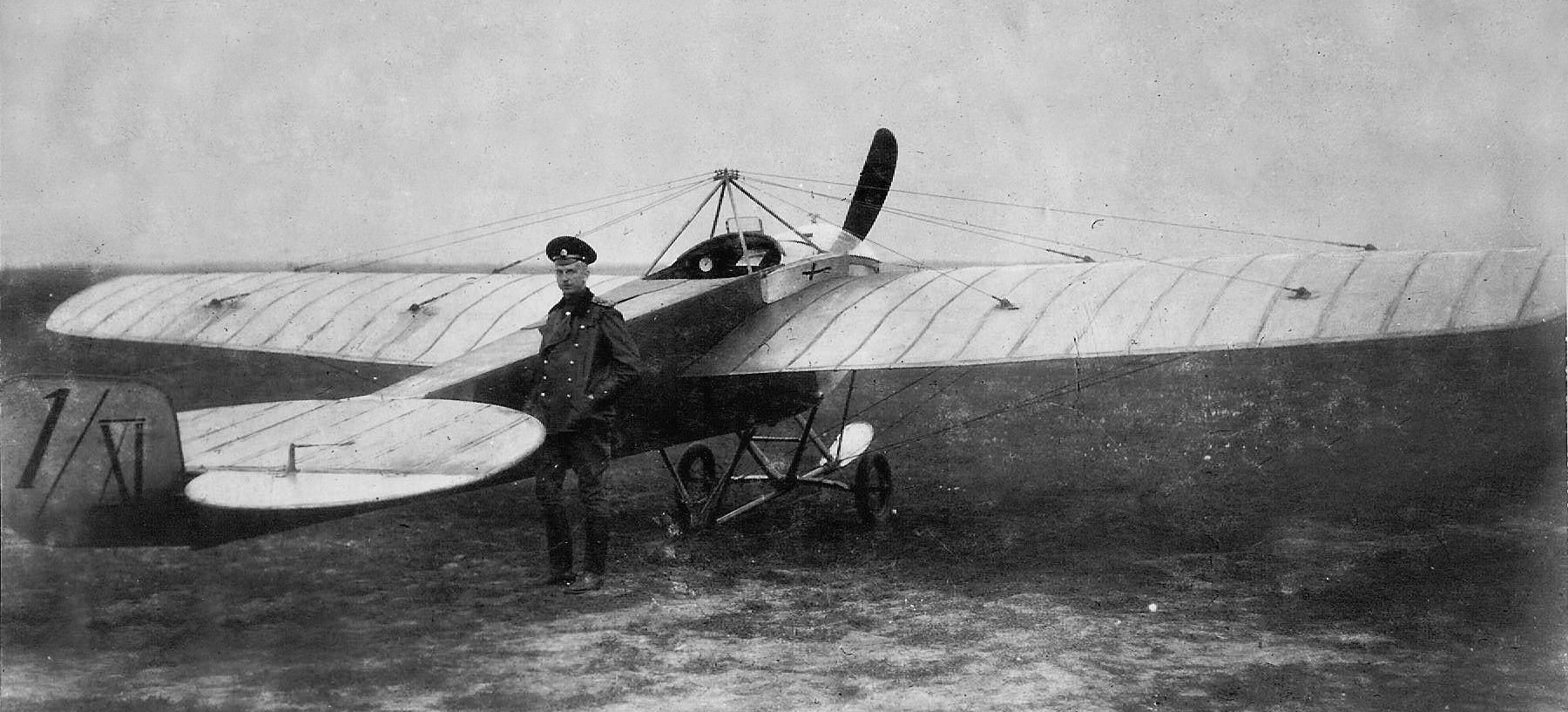
Pyotr Nesterov with the Nieuport IV.G he looped

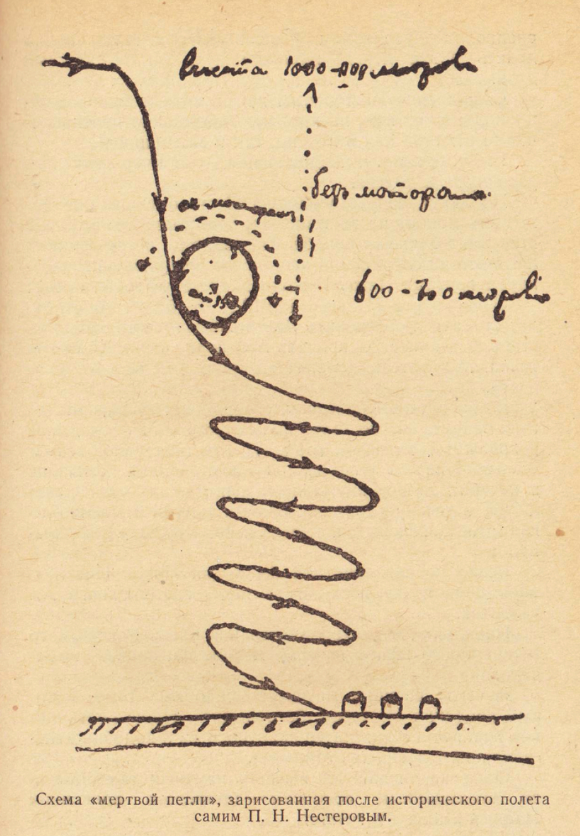
Nesterov's sketch of the execution of Nesterov's loop

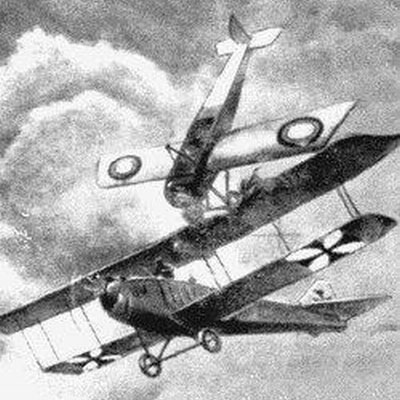
Painting of the aerial ramming attack performed by Pyotr Nesterov

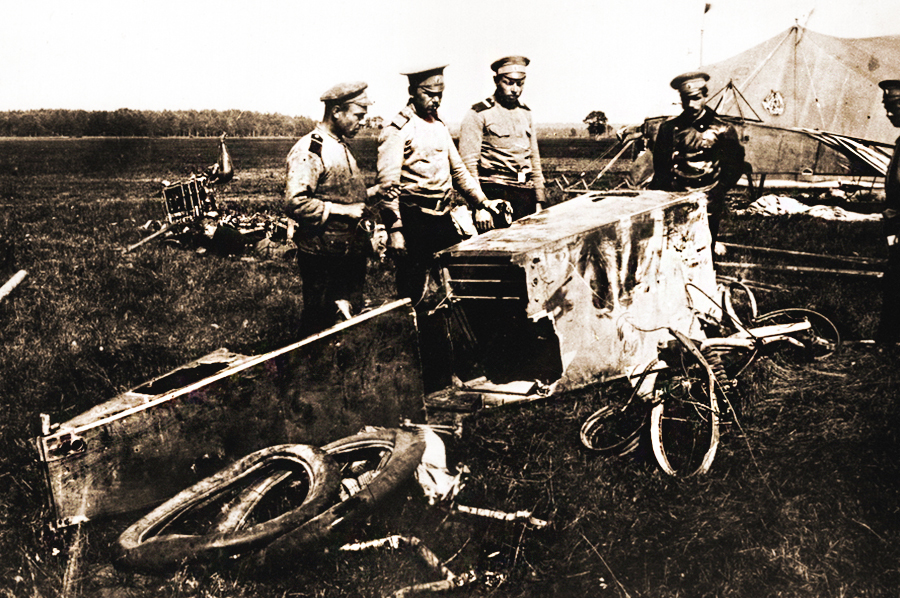
Albatros aircraft brought down by Nesterov

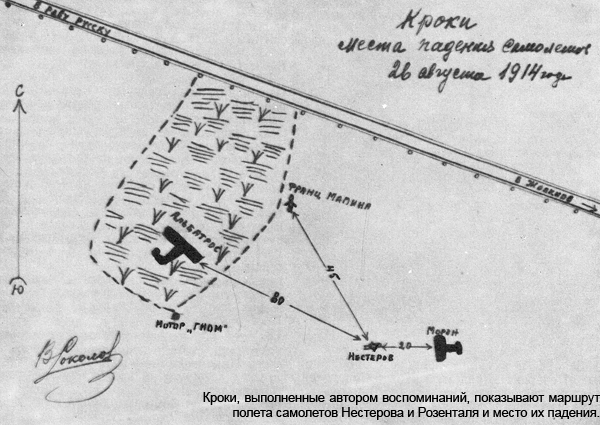
Sketches of the crash site of Nesterov's plane

Nesterov was born on 15 February 1887 in Nizhny Novgorod, into the family of an army officer, a cadet corps teacher. In August 1904, he left the military school in Nizhny Novgorod and went to Mikhailov artillery academy in St Petersburg. He became a second lieutenant and served in the 9th East Siberian Artillery Brigade in Vladivostok. By the laws of that time, an officer who married before the age of 28 had to contribute a so-called ‘reserve’ to the state treasury – a deposit of 5,000 rubles to provide for his family in the event of his death. The only exception was made for officers who served in the Far East; as Nesterov did not have the money, he took his young wife to the Far East.

In 1909, Nesterov came into contact with aviation when he was posted to a balloon observation regiment as an observer. In 1911 he built his first glider and learned to fly it, before entering flight training at the St. Petersburg aviation school at Gatchina in June, graduating 11 October 1912. A short time later he also passed the examination to be a military pilot. In May 1913 he became leader of an aviation detachment in Kiev, completing night flights at that time.

== Achievements ==
Nesterov believed an aircraft could fly a loop, a feat not previously performed. Despite the doubts of his peers, Nesterov proved his theory on 9 September 1913 (27 August by the Old Style calendar still used in Russia) and became the first pilot to fly a loop. This was done in a Nieuport IV monoplane over Syretsky military airfield (Russian: Сырецкий военный аэродром, named after the Syrets neighborhood) near Kiev, in front of numerous watchers. For this he was disciplined with ten days of close arrest, ostensibly "for risking government property". His achievement made him famous overnight and when the feat was officially done by the famous French pilot Adolphe Pégoud, the punishment was reversed; he was promoted to staff captain and later awarded a medal. Stressing the value of these exercises for a military pilot, Nesterov improved Russian flight methods through extensive training, both with cross country flights and steep turns, and designed a vee tail for the Nieuport he was flying although its performance proved disappointing. The aerial loop is also known "Nesterov's loop" or "dead loop".

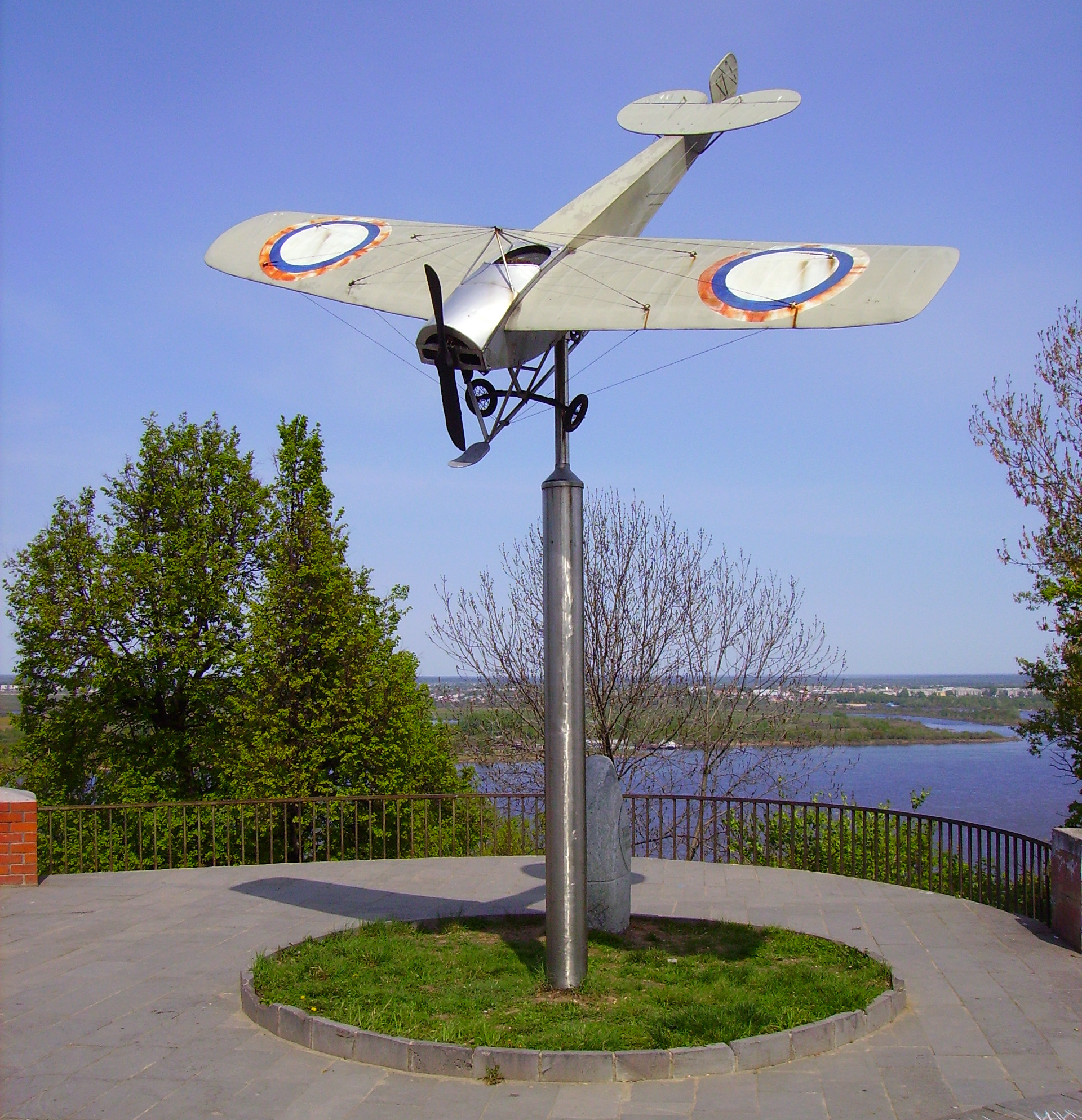
Monument in Nizhny Novgorod of the Nieuport IV.G in which Nesterov performed the first loop.

Aircraft were still unarmed at this early stage, and Nesterov became the first pilot to destroy an enemy airplane in flight. During the Battle of Galicia on 7 September 1914 (25 August by the calendar then used in Russia), after trying various methods on previous occasions unsuccessfully, he used his Morane-Saulnier Type G (s/n 281) to ram the Austrian Albatros B.II reconnaissance aircraft of observer Baron Friedrich von Rosenthal and pilot Franz Malina from FLIK 11. As was common for the time, Nesterov was not strapped in and he fell from his plane, dying of his injuries the next day. The Austrian pilot and observer also died. The town of Zhovkva (currently in Lviv Oblast, Ukraine), located near the battle, was renamed Nesterov in his honor in 1951.

== Legacy ==
Nesterov was buried in Kiev, Russian Empire. His ramming method was used during the Second World War by a number of Soviet pilots with success and without loss of life. The technique became known as taran. In his honor, the Soviet Union established the Nesterov Cup for the best aerobatics team. The cup was donated to the Fédération Aéronautique Internationale (FAI) in 1962. It is awarded to the Men's World Team Champions of the World Aerobatic Championships.

The outer main-belt asteroid 3071 Nesterov, discovered by Soviet astronomer Tamara Mikhailovna Smirnova in 1973, is named after him.

== Sources ==
- Carson, Annette (1986). Flight Fantastic: The Illustrated History of Aerobatics.
- Durkota, Alan; Darcey, Thomas; Kulikov, Victor (1995). The Imperial Russian Air Service — Famous Pilots and Aircraft of World War I. Mountain View, CA: Flying Machines Press. ISBN 0-963711024.
- Guttman, Jon; et al. (2009). Pusher Aces of World War 1. London: Osprey Pub Co. ISBN 1-84603-417-5., and ISBN 978-1846034176.
