= Aleksey Khlobystov =

Soviet fighter pilot (1918–1943)

Aleksey Stepanovich Khlobystov
- Алексей Степанович Хлобыстов
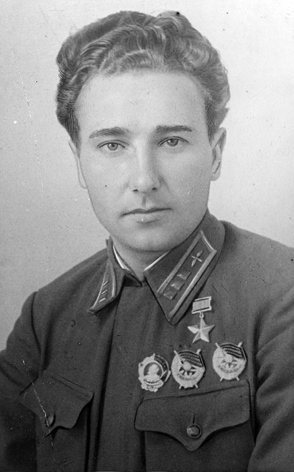
- Born: 23 February 1918; Zakharovo village, Ryazan Governorate, Russian SFSR
- Died: 13 December 1943 (aged 25); Murmansk Oblast, Soviet Union
- Military career
- Allegiance: Soviet Union
- Branch: Soviet Air Force
- Service years: 1939–1943
- Rank: Captain
- Conflicts: World War II; Eastern Front †
- Awards: Hero of the Soviet Union; Order of Lenin; Order of the Red Banner (2)

Aleksey Stepanovich Khlobystov (Russian: Алексей Степанович Хлобыстов; 23 February 1918 – 13 December 1943) was a Soviet fighter pilot and flying ace who is credited with three aerial ramming attacks; he remains the only person to have executed two rammings in one flight. He was killed in action in December 1943; possible explanations range from a mid-air collision to a last stand involving a "fire taran" attack – that is, ramming a damaged aircraft into a target on the ground.

== Early life ==
Khlobystov was born on 23 February 1918 to a Russian peasant family in the village of Zakharovo in the Ryazan Governorate during the Russian Civil War. He had completed seven years of secondary school and had moved to Moscow with his sister in 1934 after the death of their father. In addition to training at the Ukhtomsky aeroclub he studied to become an electrician until joining the Red Army in 1939.

== Military career ==
After joining the military in 1939 he graduated from the 1st Kachin Military Flight School and was assigned to the 20th Fighter Aviation Regiment, in which he first saw combat on the day German invaded the Soviet Union. He was later reassigned to the 153rd Fighter Aviation Regiment on the Leningrad front where he his reported to have scored his first aerial victory when he shot down a Ju 87 dive bomber on the 28th of June, just six days after the invasion of the Soviet Union, while flying a Polikarpov I-153. (Note: There are some discrepancies on his first victory; some sources report his first aerial victory to have been a Ju 87 dive bomber on 27 June, and in other cases his first victory is reported to have been an Bf 109 shot down in July) When the 153rd Fighter Aviation Regiment was reassigned to the Volkov front and retrained to fly MiG-3 aircraft, on which he did not score any aerial victories. Later Khlobystov was transferred to the 147th Fighter Aviation Regiment on the Karelian Front near Murmansk and learned to fly the Curtiss P-40 Warhawk, on which he scored most of his victories. On 8 April 1942 he committed his first two aerial rammings over Restikent; in that engagement, he was part of a group of originally Soviet fighters that managed to fend off 28 German aircraft. When the German aircraft approached they were met by six Soviet fighters, but later eight more Soviet fighters arrived after requests for reinforcements. After shooting down one plane he rammed two German aircraft, first an Bf 110 then an Bf 109; despite bashing the right wing of his plane against both aircraft he managed to safely land his heavily damaged P-40 after the incident. By that time he had conducted 266 combat missions and was nominated for the title Hero of the Soviet Union. He was soon promoted to the rank of captain and made a squadron commander.

He is sometimes credited with a third aerial ramming on 14 May 1942 after his plane was hit by anti-aircraft fire; whether or not he committed a ramming that day is disputed, but it is known that he was forced to bail out of his stricken plane with a parachute after enduring with serious wounds in his leg from the anti-aircraft fire in addition to sustaining engine failure. While recovering in the hospital from his wounds sustained in that engagement he was awarded the title Hero of the Soviet Union and presented with the gold star medal. After months of recovering from his wounds he returned to the warfront as part of the 20th Guards Fighter Aviation Regiment.

While serving as squadron commander on a reconnaissance mission on 13 December 1943 his plane crashed twenty miles from the city of Zaozyorsk. Estimates his final tally vary from 6 solo plus 18 shared to 7 solo and 24 shared. Despite the discovery of the crash site and Khlobystov’s remains in 2009, the exact circumstances of his death remain unclear. While it is considered possible that Khlobystov attempted a final ramming and tried to direct his damaged plane into a target on the ground after being hit with anti-aircraft fire, records of an interrogation of a German prisoner-of-war indicated that his wingman Aleksander Kolegaev may have accidentally collided with Khlobystov’s plane.

== See also ==
- Aerial ramming
- Boris Kovzan – only person known to have committed four aerial rammings
