= Kenneth Mackenzie (RAF officer) =

British flying ace of WWII

- Born: 6 August 1916; Belfast, Northern Ireland
- Died: 4 June 2009 (aged 92); Leicestershire, England
- Military career
- Allegiance: United Kingdom
- Branch: Royal Air Force
- Service years: 1939–1967
- Rank: Wing Commander
- Units: No. 501 Squadron; No. 247 Squadron
- Conflicts: Second World War: Battle of Britain; Circus offensive; Cold War
- Awards: Distinguished Flying Cross; Air Force Cross
- Other work: Deputy Commander of Zambian Air Force (1967–1970)

Kenneth Mackenzie DFC, AFC (8 June 1916 – 4 June 2009) was a flying ace of the Royal Air Force (RAF) during the Second World War. He is credited with the destruction of thirteen aircraft.

Born in Belfast, Mackenzie learnt to fly as a civilian and later joined the Royal Air Force Volunteer Reserve. Called up for service in the RAF after the outbreak of the Second World War, he was posted to No. 501 Squadron and flew Hawker Hurricane fighters in the later stages of the Battle of Britain. He claimed several aerial victories, including one where he deliberately collided with a German fighter. He was awarded the Distinguished Flying Cross in October 1940. Further aerial victories were achieved the following year, when he was assigned to No. 247 Squadron. He was shot down off the French coast in September 1941, becoming a prisoner of war. He was repatriated to the United Kingdom three years later having pretended to be insane for several months.

Mackenzie remained in the RAF in the postwar period and served in a number of instructing posts from 1946 to 1953. He was awarded the Air Force Cross in the 1953 New Year Honours. He then served in a number of staff roles with various RAF Commands and the Air Ministry in the United Kingdom, Middle East and Africa. He retired from the RAF in 1967 to take up a post as deputy commander of the Zambian Air Force for three years. Afterwards he worked in civil aviation in Kenya before retiring to Cyprus and writing his autobiography. His final years were spent in Leicestershire, where he died in 2009 at the age of 92.

== Early life ==
Kenneth William Mackenzie was born in Belfast in Northern Ireland on 8 June 1916. He was educated at the city's Methodist College before entering Queen's University to study engineering. Concurrently with his tertiary studies, he was apprenticed to the ship builders Harland and Wolff as an engineer.

Interested in aviation, Mackenzie trained as a pilot at the Airwork School of Flying at Newtownards; he qualified for his pilot certificate in May 1935. He joined the Royal Air Force Volunteer Reserve (RAFVR) in early 1935 and commenced training at No. 24 Elementary and Reserve Flying Training School in Sydenham as an airman pilot.

== Second World War ==
Soon after the commencement of the Second World War, Mackenzie was summoned from the RAFVR for service in the Royal Air Force (RAF). After initial training in Hastings from December 1939 to late February 1940, he proceeded to No. 5 Elementary Flying Training School at Hanworth. Three months later he went to No. 3 Flying Training School at South Cerney. By this time he was a sergeant but at the end of August was commissioned as a pilot officer. He was then sent to No. 61 Operational Training Unit (OTU) at Sutton Bridge to gain familiarity with the Hawker Hurricane fighter.

=== Battle of Britain ===
On 21 September, Mackenzie was posted to No. 43 Squadron. Based at Usworth and operating the Hurricane, it was in a period of reduced operations after its involvement in the Battle of Britain. Mackenzie was only at the squadron for a matter of days, most of which were spent carrying out training flights, before being assigned to No. 501 Squadron. This was another Hurricane-equipped unit, based in Kenley as part of No. 11 Group and therefore still heavily engaged in the fighting over the southeast of England.

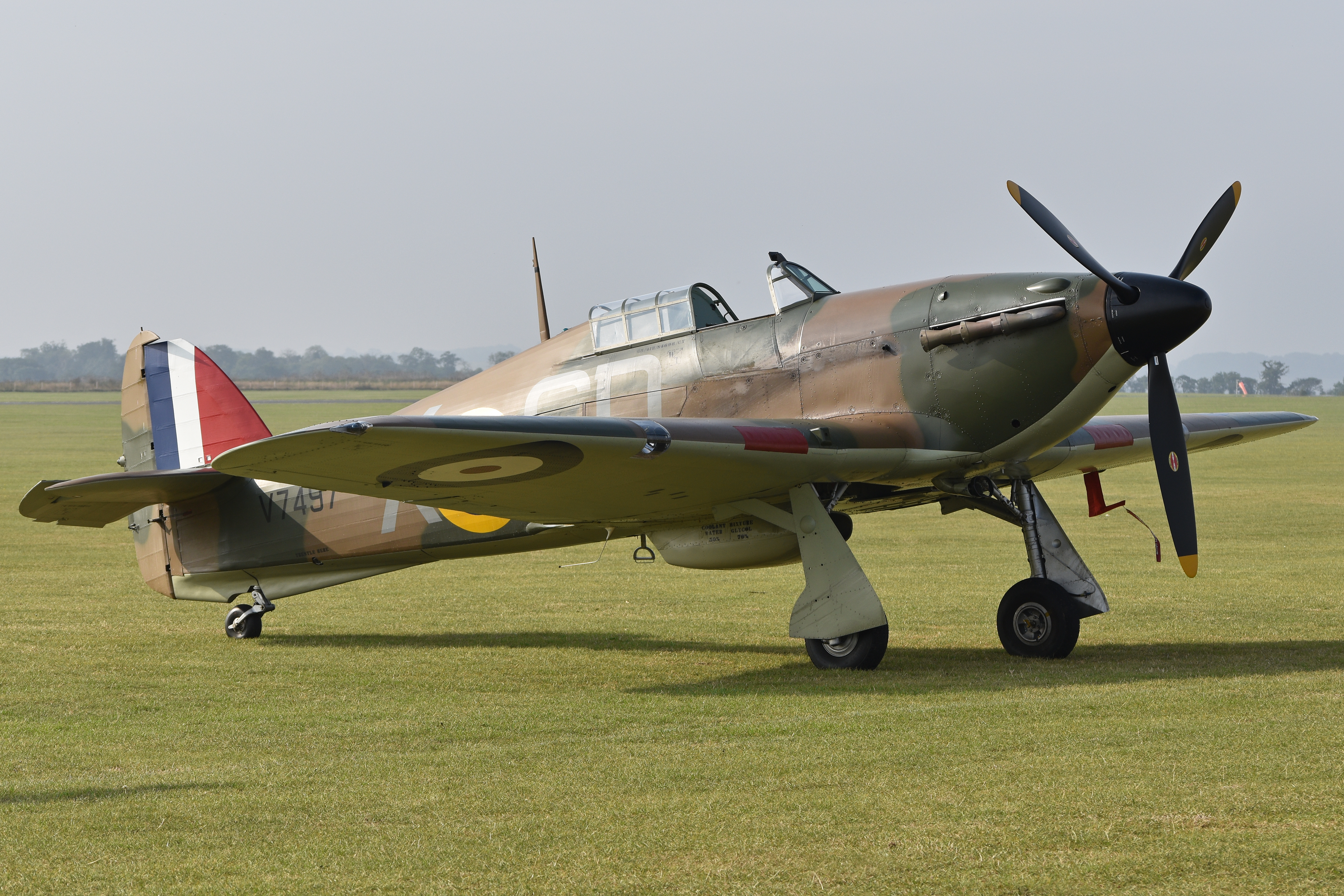
A restored Hawker Hurricane fighter of No. 501 Squadron

On 4 October, Mackenzie shared with another pilot in the damaging of a Junkers Ju 88 medium bomber to the south of Kenley. The next day he shot down a Messerschmitt Bf 109 fighter near the Thames estuary. On 7 October he shared in the destruction of a Bf 109 in the vicinity of Ashford. On a subsequent sortie later in the day he engaged a second Bf 109 at low level over the Thames estuary but after expending his ammunition to no apparent effect, flew close enough to the fighter to strike its tail with his wing. This caused the Bf 109 to tumble out of control and crash into the sea. The German pilot was rescued while Mackenzie was able to fly his Hurricane back over land, making a crash landing near Folkestone during which he received facial injuries. As a result of this escapade he was nicknamed 'Super Mac' by his fellow pilots.

On 25 October, Mackenzie shot down a Bf 109 and shared in the probable destruction of a second. He also damaged a third Bf 109. In a later sortie he was involved in a collision with another pilot of the squadron when forming up to attack a group of German fighters. While Mackenzie was able to safely parachute from his aircraft, the other pilot was killed. The same day, Mackenzie's award of the Distinguished Flying Cross was announced. The citation, published in The London Gazette, read:

Early in October, 1940, whilst on patrol, this officer sighted a formation of eight Messerschmitt 109's. He attacked and damaged one of them which dived to sea level. Having expended all his ammunition, Pilot Officer McKenzie flew alongside the hostile aircraft and endeavoured unsuccessfully to force the enemy into the sea. Undeterred he severed the tail-plane of the Messerschmitt with his wing tip. Subsequently he was attacked by a number of Messerschmitt 109's, and although his aircraft was severely damaged he succeeded in reaching land and made a crash landing. In one week, Pilot Officer McKenzie has destroyed five enemy aircraft. His skill and gallantry have been of the highest order.

— London Gazette, No. 34978, 25 October 1940

Two days after the events of 25 October, Mackenzie destroyed a Bf 109 over East Grinstead. He shot down another Bf 109 on 29 October, this time over Dungeness. The next day, while carrying out an air test, he engaged a Bf 109 in the vicinity of Maidstone. While he lost sight of the attacked fighter in cloud, it was subsequently confirmed to have come down in the sea. On 8 November he destroyed yet another Bf 109 over the Thames estuary. Four days later he shared in the shooting down of a Heinkel He 111 medium bomber along the coast near Ashford, although this may have been misidentified as a Ju 88 at the time. On 15 November, during an engagement with German fighters over Southend, he damaged one Bf 109 and destroyed a second.

=== Circus offensive ===
In December, No. 501 Squadron was moved to Filton, part of No. 10 Group, where it would remain until April 1941. Then, and now operating from Colerne, switched to offensive operations as part of the RAF's Circus offensive. In June, Mackenzie was posted to No. 247 Squadron as a flight commander. This was based at Predannack from where it was engaged in night fighter duties and daytime sorties to German-occupied France. Mackenzie shot down a Ju 88 near Falmouth on the night of 6 July and this was followed his destruction of a He 111 that was attacking a convoy off Land's End on the night of 12 September. By this time, his substantive rank had been made up to flying officer.

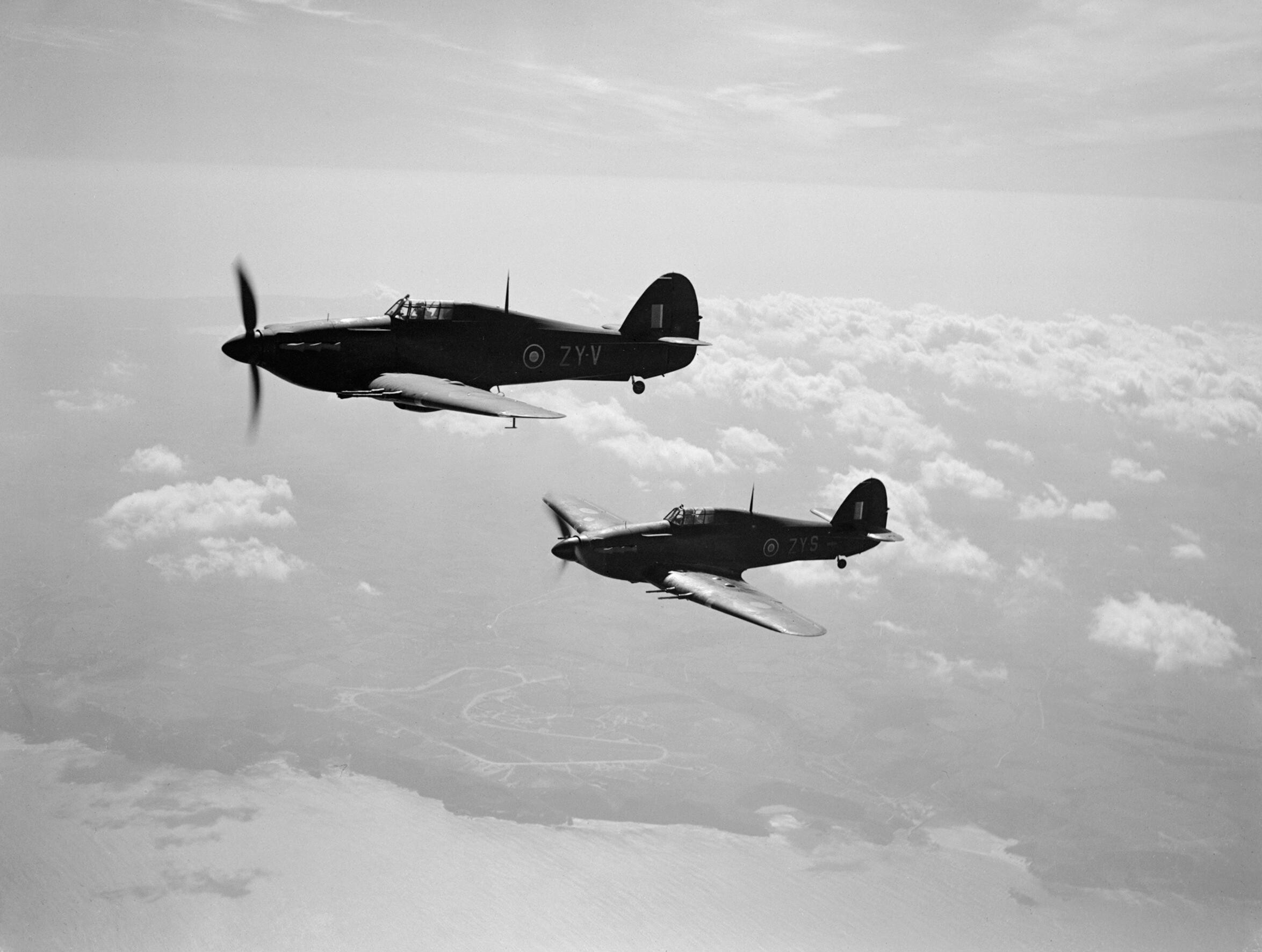
Hawker Hurricane night fighters of No. 247 Squadron during the period it was based at Predannack

On 29 September, Mackenzie was part of a sortie to Brittany in France, tasked with attacking Lannion Airfield. His Hurricane was hit by antiaircraft fire and he had to put down the aircraft off the Brittany coast. Using his emergency inflatable dinghy he made it to shore but was captured, becoming a prisoner of war (POW). While being transported to a POW camp, he briefly escaped custody in Paris but was swiftly caught.

=== Prisoner of war ===
Mackenzie was held at Oflag VI-B, at Warburg, and promptly involved himself in escape attempts. He was part of the camp's tunnelling team and at one point, in April 1942, while excavating a tunnel that had been dug to the fence a portion of it collapsed. He was fortunate in avoid being trapped. When the escape attempt was mounted through the tunnel, it was quickly detected and suppressed by the camp's guards. Mackenzie made his own attempt, with another prisoner, to escape a few weeks later by hiding in a ditch from which they were to dig under the fence. This too was detected but the two potential escapees were able to retreat back into the camp without being caught. He was subsequently transferred to Stalag Luft III at Sagan.

There, rather than attempting to actively escape, Mackenzie opted to pretend he had become insane. In October 1944, he was among several POWs that were allowed to be repatriated to the United Kingdom. By this time his substantive rank was flight lieutenant due to a promotion while he was imprisoned. After a period of leave, Mackenzie returned to active duty in December, with a posting to No. 53 OTU at Kirton-in-Lindsey as an instructor. This was a duty at which he was particularly proficient.

== Postwar career ==
After the war, Mackenzie opted to extend his service in the RAF rather than return to civilian life. He remained on instructing duties, now with No. 61 OTU at Keevil. In due course, that training unit became No. 203 Advanced Flying School and was moved to Chivenor. By this time, Mackenzie, who had attended a course at the Empire Flying School at Hullavington, held the rank of squadron leader and was commanding the school's Conversion and Tactical Squadron.

From February 1949 to July 1951 Mackenzie served at the headquarters of Fighter Command, working on fighter training, before becoming an instructor on Gloster Meteor jet fighters at No. 226 Operational Conversion Unit at Stradishall with the rank of acting wing commander. He was subsequently awarded the Air Force Cross in the 1953 New Year Honours for his work in this capacity.

In 1953, Mackenzie was posted to the headquarters of RAF Middle East, based at Ismailia. It was subsequently moved to Cyprus, by which time his substantive rank was wing commander. In 1956, he returned to the United Kingdom to serve with the Air Ministry. There he engaged in training with Coastal and Bomber Commands. He also became involved in motorsports and raced a Turner Sprint Ford at thee Goodwood Circuit in the Tourist Trophy, a round of the 1963 World Sportscar Championship, for the Royal Air Force Motorsports Association.

In November 1963, Mackenzie was posted back to the Middle East to serve with the headquarters of Near East Air Force but after two years returned to the United Kingdom to serve with Maintenance Command at Andover. In 1966, in the aftermath of Rhodesia's Unilateral Declaration of Independence, he was posted to Lusaka in Zambia, to join the headquarters of the Commander British Forces in Zambia (COMBRITZAM). This had been established as a means to control delivery of oil to Zambia, which normally received its supplies via the now sanctioned Rhodesia. As a result of his work at COMBRITZAM, Mackenzie was offered a senior post with the Zambian Air Force. He accepted the role and duly retired from the RAF at his own request in July 1967.

== Later life ==
Mackenzie served in the Zambian Air Force as its deputy commander for nearly a three-year period. In April 1970 he resigned to run Kenya Air, an airline based at Nairobi in Kenya. He retired from this endeavour in April 1973 and settled in Cyprus. In his retirement he wrote his autobiography, Hurricane Combat; The Nine Lives of a Fighter Pilot, which was published by William Kimber in 1987. This was credited as being "unvarnished sincerity". In 2000, he moved back to the United Kingdom and settled in Lutterworth in Leicestershire. He died on 4 June 2009.

A street in Lutterworth is named for Mackenzie, who had three children. He is credited with having destroyed thirteen aircraft, three shared with other pilots. He also damaged three aircraft, one of these being shared with another pilot.
