= Royal Air Force Motorsports Association =

- Abbreviation: RAFMSA
- Founded: 1961; 65 years ago
- Website: RAF Motorsports Association

The Royal Air Force Motor Sports Association (RAFMSA) is the officially recognised sports body of the Royal Air Force (RAF) that encourages participation in motor sports. As well as running its own competitions and championships, its members variously compete and officiate in other motor sports events at local, national, and international level.

Full Membership of RAFMSA is only open to serving RAF personnel; whilst RAFMSA Associate Membership is available to dependents of serving personnel, former personnel, and those having an association or working with the RAF. The supported 4-wheel disciplines include sprinting/time-trials, circuit racing, rallying, and karting; whilst the 2-wheel disciplines include road racing, trials, enduro, and motocross.

The RAFMSA is affiliated to both Motorsport UK (MSA) and the Auto-Cycle Union (ACU).

RAFMSA Karting runs the Inter-Service Kart Championship.
