= PRD Fireball =

Go-kart racing engine

The PRD Fireball is a two-stroke go-kart racing engine manufactured by Pro Racing Design Co, Ltd. Pro Racing Design is a Taipei, Taiwan based company, manufacturing an array of racing engines for use in professional go-kart racing worldwide. Pro Racing Design was founded by Chris Dell from Australia and it is now an Australian-based manufacturer. The Fireball represents an engine targeted for multiple racing classes: International Kart Federation (IKF), World Karting Association (WKA) and Touch and Go (TAG) USA. The PRD Fireball is the cheapest TAG motor available to purchase new in the USA.

== Specifications ==
- Carburetor: Tillotson HL-360A
- Cooling system: Water
- Cylinder Volume: 122.25 cc
- Bore / Stroke: 53.60 mm / 54 mm
- Horsepower / RPM: 28.5 HP / 15,580 RPM
- Oil to Fuel Ratio: 1:16 (8 oz to the gallon)
