= Taiatari =

Taiatari (体当たり, tai-atari; "body strike") is a Kendo movement, literally meaning to hit (ataru) with the body (tai). It is a collision move used to break the kamae and therefore the defense of the opponent.

A correct taiatari is executed with the sword held vertically and the fists held firmly in front of the navel or slightly higher. The force comes from the legs driving the body forward, rather than the arms pushing the opponent away. During practice, a person receiving a taiatari should hold firm. Moving back to absorb the shock could be dangerous depending on the intention of the taiatari.
