= Hybrid martial arts =

Fighting system incorporating different techniques

Hybrid martial arts, also known as hybrid fighting systems, eclectic martial arts or freestyle martial arts, are mixed martial arts or fighting systems that incorporate techniques and theories from several martial arts. While numerous martial arts borrow or adapt from other arts and to some extent could be considered hybrids, a hybrid martial art emphasizes its disparate origins. Modern examples of this approach include Hybrid Combat Systems, which integrates striking and grappling techniques from multiple martial arts into a unified training methodology."The System". Hybrid Combat System.

== History ==
The idea of hybridization or "mixing" of martial arts traditions originates in the 5th century BC. The concept rose to wide popularity during 5th century BC in Greek Olympic game Pankration, which uses aspects derived from various arts including boxing and wrestling.

== Notable hybrid martial arts ==
- Aikido S.A. (Japan)
- Akban (Israel)
- American Kenpo (United States)
- American Tang Soo Do (United States)
- ARB (martial art) (Soviet Union/Russia)
- Army Combatives (United States)
- Bartitsu (United Kingdom)
- Combat Hapkido (United States)
- Combat Hopak (Ukraine)
- Chinese Goju System (United States)
- Chun Kuk Do (United States)
- Defendo (Canada)
- Defendu (United Kingdom)
- Emerson Combat Systems (United States)
- German Ju-Jutsu (Germany)
- Gongkwon Yusul (South Korea)
- Hapkido (South Korea)
- Hokutoryu Ju-Jutsu (Finland)
- Hwa Rang Do (Korea)
- Mixed martial arts (International)
- Jailhouse rock (fighting style) (United States)
- Jeet Kune Do (United States)
- Jieitaikakutōjutsu (Japan)
- Kajukenbo (Hawaii)
- Kenko Kempo Karate (Germany)
- Kalaripayattu (India)
- Kickboxing (International)
- Koluchstyle (Poland)
- Krav Maga (Israel)
- Kūdō (Japan)
- Kuk Sool Won (South Korea)
- Kun Tai Ko
- Kuntao (Southeast Asia - Malay Archipelago)
- Kyukgido (South Korea)
- Limalama (Samoa)
- Liu Seong Kuntao (Indonesia)
- Luta Livre (Brazil)
- Marine Corps Martial Arts Program (United States)
- Okichitaw (Canada)
- Oom Yung Doe (United States)
- Pancrase (Japan)
- Real Aikido (Serbia)
- Sambo (martial art) (Russia)
- Sanda (sport) (China)
- Sanjuro (martial art) (United Kingdom)
- Sanuces Ryu (United States)
- Shaolin Kempo Karate (United States)
- Shidōkan Karate (Japan)
- Shotokan Karate (Okinawa/Japan)
- Shoot boxing (Japan)
- Shoot wrestling (Japan)
- Shootfighting (Japan)
- Shooto (Japan)
- Shorinji Kempo (Japan)
- Silat (Indonesia/Malaysia)
- Sin Moo Hapkido (South Korea)
- Small Circle JuJitsu (United States)
- SPEAR System (Canada)
- Special Combat Aggressive Reactionary System (United States)
- Striking MMA (New Zealand)
- Subak (Korea)
- Systema (Russia)
- Tang Shou Dao (Taiwan)
- Tang Soo Do (South Korea)
- Teukgong Moosool (South Korea)
- To-Shin Do (United States)
- Unified Weapons Master (Australia)
- Unifight (Russia/Germany)
- Vale Tudo (Brazil)
- Vovinam (Vietnam)
- Vee-Jitsu (Philippines)
- Wei Kuen Do (United States)
- Yaw-Yan (Philippines)
- Yongmudo (Korea)
- Yoseikan Budo (Japan/France)
- Zero Range Combat (Japan)

== See also ==
- Boxing styles and technique
- Comparison of karate styles
- Okinawan kobudō
- Styles of Chinese martial arts
- Styles of wrestling
