= Combatives =

Hand-to-hand combat training of US Army

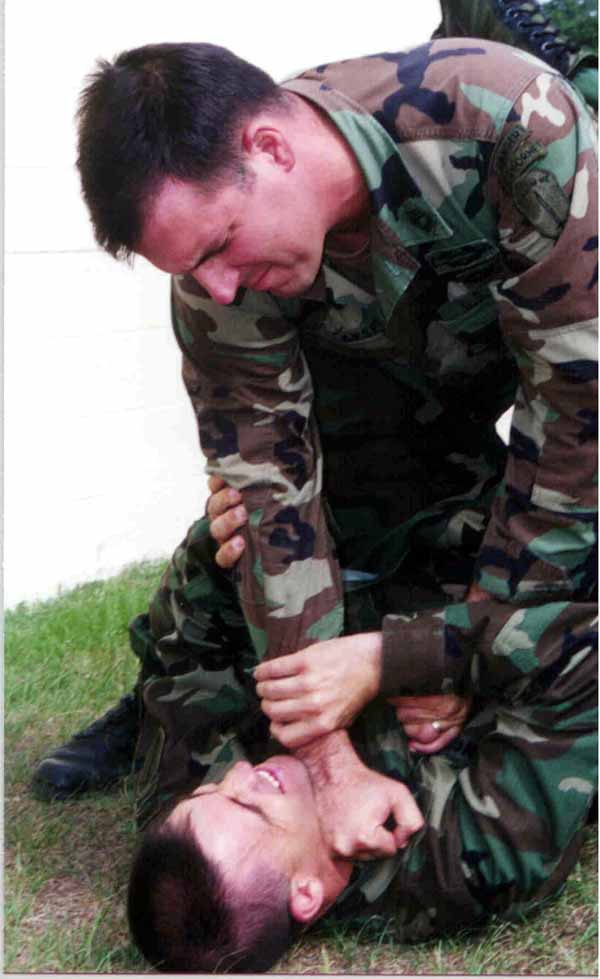
Training demonstration of a chokehold

Combatives are hand-to-hand combat systems used by members of the military and law enforcement, security personnel and corrections officers. Combatives are based in martial arts but are not distinct disciplines.

The US Modern Army Combatives Program was adopted as the basis for the US Air Force Combatives Program in January 2008. Combatives training has also been provided outside of the military, for example at Kansas State University which provided a training programme for 2 1/2 years before closing it in 2010.

== See also ==
- Marine Corps Martial Arts Program
  - Defendu
  - All-In Fighting
- ARB (martial art)
- Jieitaikakutōjutsu
- Junshi Sanda
- Krav Maga
- LINE (combat system)
- Kyeok Sul
- Sambo (martial art)
- SPEAR System
- Special Combat Aggressive Reactionary System
- Systema
