= LINE (combat system) =

Close-quarters combat method

LINE Combat System
- Also known as: Linear Involuntary Neural-override Engagement
- Focus: Hybrid
- Country of origin: United States
- Creator: Ron Donvito, USMC (Retired)
- Parenthood: various
- Olympic sport: No

LINE is a close-quarters combat system, derived from various martial arts, utilized by the United States Marine Corps between 1989 and 1998, and then from 1998 to 2007 by US Army Special Forces. It was developed by Ron Donvito, USMC (Retired).

Officially, the name stands for "Linear Involuntary Neural-override Engagement"; this is, however, a backronym coined during the project's inception.

== Design ==
The system was designed to be executed within specific and stringent combat-oriented conditions:

- all techniques must not be vision dominant; techniques may be executed effectively in low-light conditions, or other impaired visibility conditions (i.e., smoke or gas)
- extreme mental and physical fatigue
- usable by the marine / soldier while wearing full combat gear
- proper execution of the techniques must cause death to the opponent
- gender neutrality; must be usable by—and against—either gender

These parameters were viewed as the most likely conditions that a combat marine or soldier would face in close-range combat, since most close combat engagements were likely to occur at night or under reduced visibility, while the marine or soldier was fatigued and wearing their combat load, and when facing asymmetrical odds, such as a numerically superior force. These requirements meant that many flamboyant techniques, exotic kicks, or movements requiring extraordinary feats of strength or agility were excluded from consideration under the LINE system. Techniques like classic judo "hip throws", for instance, were excluded because of the possibility of entanglement on a practitioner's war-belt.

The system's techniques were designed to be easily learned and retained through repetition. The requirement and demands that the system be drilled, repeated, and constantly revisited led to some criticism since the primary users – military, including special operations, personnel – often had enormous demands upon their time, and as a consequence often lacked the ability to maintain high degrees of proficiency in the techniques.

== History ==
=== USMC ===
LINE was adopted by the Marine Corps in 1989 at a Course Content Review Board (CRB) at Quantico, Virginia. All techniques were demonstrated for and deemed medically feasible by the Armed Forces Medical Examiner (given a single attack opponent) and a board of forensic pathologists from the Armed Forces Institute of Pathology (AFIP) in 1991. LINE was replaced by the Marine Corps Martial Arts Program (MCMAP) by Marine Corps Order 1500.54, published in 2002, although it had been actually dropped in 1998, as a "revolutionary step in the development of martial arts skills for Marines and replaces all other close-combat related systems preceding its introduction."

=== US Army Special Forces ===
The LINE System was adopted in 1998 by U.S. Army Special Forces at the Special Forces Qualification Course (SFQC). Primary instruction took place during phase II and was remediated in phases III and V at Fort Bragg, North Carolina. LINE was replaced by the Modern Army Combatives Program (MACP) in October 2007.

=== US Air Forces ===
In 2007 the Chief of Staff of the Air Force read an article in the Air Force Times about Airmen training in the LINE system and ordered a review of all hand-to-hand combat in the Air Force which resulted in the Air Force adopting a program based upon the Modern Army Combatives Program (MACP).

=== Units trained ===
During its existence, units trained included (but were not limited to):

- 1st SWTG, United States Army
- United States Army Special Forces
  - 1st SFG, United States Army
  - 3rd SFG, United States Army
  - 5th SFG, United States Army
  - 7th SFG, United States Army
  - 10th SFG, United States Army
  - 19th SFG, United States Army National Guard
  - 20th SFG, United States Army National Guard
- SEAL Team II, United States Navy
- 82nd Airborne Division, United States Army
- 101st Airborne Division, United States Army
- 3rd Infantry Division, United States Army
- 4th Infantry Division, United States Army
- 172nd Infantry Brigade Stryker, United States Army
- SOC South, United States Army
- 1st COSCOM, United States Army
- 96th Civil Affairs, United States Army
- 32nd MedCom, United States Army
- 44th MedCom, United States Army
- 112th Signal Bn, United States Army
- 27th Engineer Bn, United States Army
- 8th PsyOps, United States Army
- CGSC, United States Army
- 5th ASOS, United States Air Force
- 5th CBCG, United States Air Force

== See also ==
- Combatives
- List of martial arts
- Marine Corps Martial Arts Program
- S.C.A.R.S. (military)
- SPEAR System
- Taijutsu
- United States Army Combatives School
