= Defendo =

Canadian military martial art

- Also known as: Combato, Underwood Systems
- Focus: Hybrid
- Country of origin: Canada
- Creator: Canadian Forces
- Parenthood: Jujutsu, Western Grappling, Boxing, fencing
- Olympic sport: no

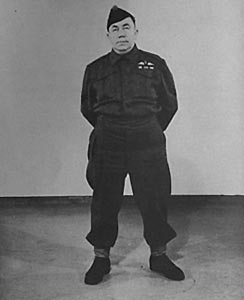
Bill Underwood

Defendo is a Canadian military martial art and a self defence system created during WWII for law enforcement structures by veteran instructors. Creator Bill Underwood had created Combato in 1910, at 15 years old. A "non-boxing or wrestling" unarmed combat system which he taught in Montreal, Quebec, and Toronto, Ontario. Underwood was the first to bring it out of the military and start teaching it as Defendo to the general public, which grew in popularity because of his efforts.

== History ==
Combato had its beginning in the Liverpool theatres with jujutsu demonstrations by travelling Japanese wrestlers, Yukio Tani and Taro Miyake. As a boy, Underwood idolized these experts, and rapidly established a comprehensive knowledge of their training

The public name Defendo was created on August 15, 1945, in New York City by Underwood's daughter, Pat. Pat worked in military procurement at Canadian Forces Base Trenton during the war until 1950, certainly the name Defendo had become common knowledge within the Canadian Forces. Underwood was a guest in the United States training U.S. Army Rangers and for the American FBI for use in unarmed combat. Underwood was frequently requested by American and Canadian law enforcement agencies to teach his Combato system during World War II, but as the war had ended he refused on the basis that Combato was too aggressive. Underwood was asked to modify the system to remove its lethal applications and instead focus on the law enforcement applications of self-defence, compliance and control tactics. He realized that he could not call this system Combato, so his daughter Pat Underwood proposed that he call the system "Defendo".

=== A new name ===
From 1945 to 1950 Underwood taught his developing self-defence system in Canada and the USA under the new name. In 1950 he published under copyright Defendo: Police System of Self-Defence, From 1950 to 1969, Underwood travelled throughout Canada, the United States and in the UK (1965), teaching his system. In 1969, under copyright Underwood published "Defendo, Occidental System of Self-Protection".

== Media ==
From 1969 to his death on February 8, 1986, in Newmarket, Ontario, Underwood was well known for his system and honoured and profiled frequently by the North American media. In 1980 a short documentary film about Underwood's life and work, entitled Don't Mess with Bill was nominated for an Oscar at the 53rd Academy Awards in 1981. The film was produced by Pen Densham and John Watson.

Between 1980 and 1981 Underwood appeared four times on The Tonight Show Starring Johnny Carson. He also appeared at that time on all of Hollywood's major talk shows, including Real People, That's Incredible, and Merv Griffin; on all occasions, promoting and teaching his system of Defendo.
