= MACP =

The abbreviation MACP can refer to:

- Master, American College of Physicians
- Master of Arts in Counseling Psychology
- Master of Arts in Community Psychology
- Military Aid to the Civil Power
- Modern Army Combatives Program
