= Oom Yung Doe =

Korean martial arts school

Oom Yung Doe 陰陽道
- “Kyong Gong Sul Bope” (경공술법 flying side kick) is an achievement claimed by John C. Kim. Here Kim leaps from the equivalent of an 8-story building.
- Focus: Hybrid martial arts
- Creator: John C. Kim
- Official website: oomyungdoe.com

Oom Yung Doe (Korean: 음양도; Hanja: 陰陽道) is a line of Korean martial arts schools founded by John C. Kim (Grandmaster "Iron" Kim). The training includes a combination of physical techniques, self-defense, meditation, breathing exercises, philosophy, and the use of traditional herbal formulas and equipment. Practitioners describe benefits including improved physical conditioning, self-defense ability, and general health. Some reports and small-scale studies have described improvements in areas such as lung capacity, as well as possible benefits for conditions including asthma, diabetes, rheumatoid arthritis, and blood pressure. Additional reports have examined outcomes related to musculoskeletal conditions such as back pain, though these findings are primarily based on student reports and limited research. The organization has also been the subject of media criticism and legal disputes, particularly during the late 1980s and 1990s.

== Lineage and history of Oom Yung Doe ==
Oom Yung Doe represents itself as a synthesis of several martial arts styles, but primarily a line of traditional Chinese martial arts known as Yin Yang Dao ("Oom Yung" is Korean for "Yin Yang"). Oom Yung Doe literature describes a legend indicating that the first generation Grandmaster in this line was an individual named "Bagwa" who developed the style of martial arts known as Bagwa or Bāguàzhǎng The article notes that the term “bagwa” (八卦) is commonly pronounced “palgwe” (팔괘) in Korean. The legend states that Bagwa was born in a remote province of China around 1,500 years ago and taught his unique style of martial arts to the military, royalty, and prominent citizens. Thomas White reports that a majority of Grandmaster “Iron” Kim’s knowledge was passed down through the seventh generation Grandmaster, “Wang Po.”[6] " White further reports that Kim received the title of Grandmaster in 1974.

Kim emigrated to the United States in the early 1970s, and opened his first American school of martial arts in 1973, teaching Kong Su in Westmont, IL. In 1976, John C. Kim began operating a line of martial arts schools called "Chung Moo Quan" (충무권), teaching the same 8 martial arts styles that are taught in modern Oom Yung Doe schools. "Chung Moo Quan" was effectively renamed to "Chung Moo Doe" (충무도) in 1989, and again to "Oom Yung Doe" in 1999; the instructor corps and training techniques for the three schools have been similar, and the schools were headed by John C. Kim. Kim died on February 14, 2016.

== Training ==
“Moo Doe” is generally translated as “traditional martial arts,” but within the school the original term is also used to distinguish Oom Yung Doe’s techniques — described as having been passed down over centuries — from many martial arts commonly taught in the U.S., which are viewed within the school as systems based on newly created, modified, or imitated movements rather than preserved traditional forms. In common martial arts, students learn "general sequences of movements; movements that are basically the same for everyone. In this case the student/practitioner can truly only 'copy' the movement and cannot truly absorb and make it 'one' with their mind and body."

In contrast, Oom Yung Doe literature states that training should be adapted to the individual practitioner and that techniques should be adjusted to fit each student’s physical characteristics and abilities rather than taught identically to all students. The main line of Oom Yung Doe training is directed by a traditional master (not a school instructor, but a 9th degree international master who is required to clearly demonstrate their skill and ability). Because the master is able to "fit" the movement to the individual, each student/practitioner can fully absorb the movement.

Training is adjusted to fit the individual student, allowing even older individuals or individuals with injuries or conditions such as arthritis to participate. In fact, instructors claim (and some students have reported) that Oom Yung Doe training can help older or disabled individuals dramatically improve their condition.

Some of the main goals of practicing moo doe are said to be:

- To develop skill and ability (speed, strength, timing, flexibility, and coordination)
- To bring the mind, body, and movement together as one
- To bring full balance to the mind and body for increased health
- To develop strong self-defense capabilities

=== 8 Martial Arts ===
According to Oom Yung Doe literature, the schools teach eight different martial arts as a unified system. These are listed as the following eight styles of martial arts:

- Hap Ki Do / Ai Ki Do
- Kong Su / Tae Kwon Do
- Udo / Ju Jitsu
- Kom Do / Samurai
- Kung Fu
- Tai Chi
- Bagwa Chung
- Ship Pal Gae

=== Tournaments ===
A 3rd degree Oom Yung Doe black belt demonstrates drunken form

Movement taught by a master is often demonstrated in a tournament. In tournaments, practitioners demonstrate movement and self-defense ability, and are judged based on:

- Strength
- Correctly connecting movements
- Speed
- Coordination
- Balance
- Accuracy
- Focus (eyes)
- Top body movement
- Middle body movement
- Lower body movement

=== Acupressure and herbal equipment ===
Herbal formulas and acupressure points are an essential part of Oom Yung Doe practice. Herbal formulas used by practitioners are said to improve circulation and remove toxins from the body, and some movements taught within the school are designed to stimulate internal pressure points (similar to acupuncture).

Critics have questioned the value of herbal products sold by Oom Yung Doe. In a television news investigation, Steve Given and Allen Sayigh examined a bag of dried herbal materials sold for fifty dollars and estimated that its contents were worth only a few dollars."

=== Medical benefits ===
Oom Yung Doe has been represented as a way to build health and longevity; students and instructors report increased physical health as a major benefit of Oom Yung Doe practice. Students report benefits such as strength, flexibility, increased energy level, and a general sense of well-being, as well as improvements in conditions such as asthma and diabetes. One study published in the Journal of Asian Martial Arts found that students practicing qi gong techniques taught within the school had significantly better lung capacity than the general population (20-25% greater for students 35 years and younger, and 30-45% greater for older students).

The school also teaches techniques designed to repair damage to the body. A retrospective study of 58 patients with herniated disks who had been treated by the school indicated significant improvement:

After 120 days, 90% of the patients had been completely free of back pain for 2 weeks; another 4% of patients had partial relief. These patients all had complete resolution of pain after 140-160 days of therapy. All patients who had taken leave from work were able to return.

Some studies and news reports have described health-related benefits associated with breathing exercises and movement training taught within the school, including increased lung capacity and improvement in certain chronic conditions. and there have also been several news reports publicizing some of the benefits described by the students.

=== Uniforms and ranking ===
Rank	Belt	Uniform	Typical Position
White belt	White	White Korean-style	Student
1st-6th section	Partially black	White Korean-style	Student
1st degree	Black	White Korean-style	Student or instructor
2nd degree	Black	White or black Korean-style	Student or instructor
3rd degree	Black	Black Korean-style	Head instructor
4th and 5th degree	Black	Black Chinese-style	Regional-level instructor
6th and 7th degree	Gold	Black Chinese-style	National-level instructor
8th degree	Gold	Black Chinese-style	National-level instructor
9th degree	Varies	Varies	Master

Beginning Oom Yung Doe practitioners are ranked into "sections" until reaching first degree black belt. Beginning students receive a white belt, sections of which are dyed black at each promotion until the rank of first degree black belt is achieved, at which point the entire belt is black. Higher-level instructors have a gold belt as part of their uniform trim, although their rank continues to be that of "nth degree black belt".

Oom Yung Doe instructors are likewise promoted through a series of instructor positions. Rank generally indicates skill and ability, while position generally indicates a practitioner's involvement with teaching. The two are independent, although there's a typical correspondence between them as indicated on the chart on the right.

All Oom Yung Doe practitioners wear standardized uniforms while practicing in the school. Students and beginning instructors wear white uniforms, and main instructors and higher-level practitioners wear black uniforms. Practitioners at 3rd degree black belt and below wear Korean-style uniforms similar to Karategi. 4th degree black belts and above wear Chinese-style ("Kung Fu") uniforms which button together at the front (similar to a button-down shirt).

== Legal Proceedings ==
=== 1989: Allegations of violating the Consumer Fraud Act in Illinois ===
In 1989, the Attorney General for the State of Illinois filed charges against the school, alleging violations of the Illinois Consumer Fraud Act related to physical fitness service contracts, including claims involving contract disclosures, cancellation notices, and escalating course fees. The case continued until 1994, when it ended without trial in a consent decree in which the defendants did not admit wrongdoing or misconduct, agreed to comply with applicable laws governing physical fitness businesses, and paid $4,000 to the State Project and Court Ordered Distribution Fund for Consumer Enforcement and Education.

=== Conviction for tax conspiracy ===
: Kim and thirteen other instructors were charged in federal court with a single count of conspiracy to defraud the United States IRS in the late 1980s. Unlike tax fraud charges, conspiracy charges do not require proof that the planned acts were actually carried out. Kim and four other defendants were convicted on December 6, 1996. For sentencing purposes, the court estimated that the conspiracy involved approximately $2,172,800 in underreported income. The four defendants were each fined $500 and sentenced to five years in prison, while Kim was fined $2,550 and sentenced to five years in prison. He was released on April 13, 2001.

== Other Controversies ==
Media reports and critics of the school have at various times accused the schools of unethical behavior and of exaggerated claims of the value of the training. Some reports from the late 1980s through the 2000s accused the school’s founder and instructors of unethical behavior, high fees, and pressure to sign long-term contracts, and several television and newspaper reports from that period described the school as a “cult”.

=== Kim's claims of achievement ===
John C. Kim claims to have competed in and won the All Asia Championship (Chung Dong Yang Moo Sul Yun Moo Dae Hwey) in 1956 in the Cho Leung area of Pusan. Internal Oom Yung Doe literature lists Wang Po as the sponsor of the tournament, and Yang Chou Fai, Wang Sei Kau, and Hwan Byung Quan as the presiding judges. Also said to be in attendance were Mok Jing Quan, Chae Jung Su, Park Hyun Su, Yu Gee Han, Chil Sung, and Park Yung-Gil. This claim has attracted criticism. Nam Tae Hi, one of the founders of modern Taekwondo who operated a competing school in Chicago at the time, stated during a television investigation that becoming “champion of all Asia” in the 1950s was “not possible.” The report also noted that martial arts credentials can be difficult to verify because there are no recognized boards in the United States to approve schools or certify instructors.

Another achievement claimed by Kim is a technique he refers to as "Kyong Gong Sul Bope" (경공술법 or flying side kick) which he states involved jumping from the equivalent of an 11-story building. Kim also claimed that, while in the United States in 1972, he performed the technique again by jumping from the equivalent of an 8-story building and landing without injury on a sloped surface.

Critics have disputed these claims and characterized them as exaggerated or legendary.

=== Cost of Training ===
Critics in the early 2000s alleged that the school’s training was expensive and that students were pressured into paying for additional courses or seminars. Even some critics of the school, however, acknowledged that the rigorous training included valuable self-defense skills, and students reported additional benefits such as improved health and recovery from injury or illness. One student described the training as “like paying for therapy and personal trainers and a gym and all of that stuff rolled into one”,, while another stated that Oom Yung Doe charges “twice what other [schools] charge. But what they teach there is 10 times more than what they teach at other schools.”
