= Hwa Rang Do =

Korean martial art

- Focus: Striking, Grappling, Hybrid, and Weapons
- Hardness: Semi-Full Contact
- Country of origin: Korea
- Creator: Joo Bang Lee, Joo Sang Lee
- Parenthood: Korean martial arts
- Ancestor arts: Originally (in 1960s): Hapkido, Judo, Kumdo Later in 21st century: Submission wrestling and Kickboxing
- Olympic sport: No

- Hwa Rang Do
- Hangul: 화랑도
- Hanja: 花郞道
- RR: Hwarangdo
- MR: Hwarangdo

Hwa Rang Do (Korean: 화랑도; Hanja: 花郞道), also known as "The Way of the Flowering Knights", is a comprehensive Korean martial art that was developed in the 1960s by Joo Bang Lee and his brother Joo Sang Lee. World Hwa Rang Do Association claims lineage to ancient Hwarang from Silla, but no surviving records of Hwarang's martial art exists today. Originally as a traditional martial art, it has multiple areas of focus, including stand-up fighting with open-hand striking, weapons, throws, joint locks, various meditative practices, intellectual and character development, and artistic and cultural pursuits while focusing on self-defense. However, this art continues to develop in the 21st century, now even adopting aspects of modern combat sports, such as ground fighting sparring/competition and kickboxing.

== History ==
=== Ancient Hwarang ===
The martial art of Hwa Rang Do was named after a buddhist elite youth order of the Silla kingdom during the Three-Kingdoms period in what is now South Korea. These young men known as Hwarang (화랑; 花郎) were cultivated from a young age to fill significant roles in politics, civil service, and military duties. These individuals were selected exclusively from the royal family and aristocracy and led members of the broader public who were described as Nangdo (Rang-do: 낭도; 郎徒). This group through various names lasted through the Koryŏ dynasty until they were officially disbanded at the beginning of the Joseon dynasty.

Ancient Hwarang and Hwa Rang Do have no relations. There are claims of lineage to Hwarang from Silla Dynasty, but the fighting methods of ancient Hwarang do not have any surviving records by 20th century.

=== Origins ===
1960s was most likely the time when the name, Hwa Rang Do, was created. During that time, since it was after the Japanese occupation, many Hapkido schools considered changing their name since the names, Hapkido and Aikido, are identical if written in Chinese characters. Influenced by a desire to distance themselves from the heavy Japanese linguistic connotations of the term "Hapkido", several Hapkido schools and practitioners actively sought alternative terminology rooted in Korean cultural identity, leading to the establishment of systems like Hwarangdo and Kuk Sool Won. Joo Bang Lee was one of the recognized and well-respected Hapkido masters in Korea in the 20th century. Hwa Rang Do, in Korea, is still considered as a style of Hapkido.

=== Founding of the modern art (according to World Hwa Rang Do Association) ===
The modern martial art of Hwa Rang Do was founded by two Korean brothers, Joo Bang Lee and Joo Sang Lee, who started their martial art training with their father who taught them Judo and Kumdo at a young age. In 1942, their father worked out a deal with a monk who was locally known as Suahm Dosa to educate his sons in traditional Korean cultural training. Suahm Dosa claimed to practice within a tradition that had its roots with the ancient Hwarang, which he called Um-Yang Kwon (음양권; 陰陽拳). (Note that "Dosa" is actually his title, not his name. It is roughly equivalent to "hermit sage expert".) Both Joo Bang Lee and his brother Joo Sang Lee trained with Suahm Dosa at the Sogwangsa Temple in the Kangwon Province (North Korea), before the breakout of the Korean War and they had to flee south to avoid the communist military. The Lee family relocated to Seoul and Suahm Dosa, according to the Lee family, relocated to Odae Mountain.

The Lee brothers continued their training with Suahm Dosa when they could until around 1950 when their family moved further south to Daegu. Being too far away to continue their training, they began to be involved with the local martial art communities in the area. There, they met a martial artist named Choi Yong-sool, a practitioner of Daitō-ryū Aiki-jūjutsu and who is recognized as the father of modern Hapkido. They continued their training with Choi through the 1950s and became registered Hapkido instructors in Seoul in the early 1960s. It was also around 1960 when the Lee brothers became involved with Suh In-Hyuk, who is the founder of Kuk Sool Won. Their involvement with Suh In-Hyuk ended in the mid-'60s and the Lee brothers continued to work within the Hapkido community until 1968.

In 1968, Suahm Dosa died and left the title of "Do Ju" to Joo Bang Lee, as well as designating him as the 58th successive holder of this title. The two brothers then took all their martial arts knowledge and generated the Hwa Rang Do syllabus. They established the name "Hwa Rang Do" as its own entity separate from their involvement with the Hapkido community (earlier versions of their school's name included Hwarang-Kwon and Hwarang-Hapkido) and they continued with their Hwarang teachings. In 1969, Joo Sang Lee moved to the United States to start a school and in 1972, Joo Bang Lee followed, taking the World Headquarters of Hwa Rang Do with him.

=== Early days in America ===
Through the 1970s and 1980s, Hwa Rang Do grew throughout California and the adjacent states as well as making its mark on the international martial art scene. Both Joo Bang Lee and Joo Sang Lee performed in expo style demonstrations in the south west United States, particularity in California and Arizona, as well as on TV shows including “That's Incredible!” and “Unknown Powers”. Notably, Hwa Rang Do students who trained under the Lee brothers like Vietnam veteran Michael Echanis (1950–1978), were fundamental with Hwa Rang Do's involvement with the US Army Rangers and Special Forces, thus bringing additional credibility to Hwa Rang Do's martial art training. In addition, because of what was being offered within Hwa Rang Do, many martial artists during this time became interested in what the art had to offer. Notable names included Graciela Casillas, who trained in Hwa Rang Do for a short while and who later through her involvement with Kempo-Karate, became the first female World Champion of professional full-contact Karate.

In the 1980s into the early 1990s, Hwa Rang Do continued to grow in the United States as well as the South-East Pacific. Joo Bang Lee's sons, Henry Taejoon Lee and Eric Taehyun Lee moved into the spotlight by performing at martial art expos and demonstrations throughout the US and Europe. Henry Taejoon Lee was also involved with expanding Hwa Rang Do in college clubs throughout southern California by establishing the Intercollegiate Hwarang Society. This sub-group of the World Hwa Rang Do Association was in operation from the mid-1980s to the early to mid-1990s. Their main focus was to introduce college students to Hwa Rang Do and foster a sense of community and brotherhood within a college environment. Towards the early to mid 1990s, other universities in the US used the Intercollegiate Hwarang Society as a model to set up their own college clubs, especially where black sashes were either going to school or were employed as professors, with the same goals as the Intercollegiate Hwarang Society.

=== Time of change and development ===
As Hwa Rang Do moved into the 1990s and the new millennium, the younger generation began to make its mark on the art.

In the 1990s, Hwa Rang Do schools, while continuing to grow in the United States and the South-East Pacific, began to expand throughout Europe. Because of the demonstrations presented by the Lee family in Europe through the 1980s as well as students who had been traveling to train with Joo Bang Lee, schools were opening up in countries like Italy, the Netherlands, and Germany. Because of the amount of travel, Henry Taejoon Lee was involved in much of these developments making trips to Europe to help with the growth and development there. Today, Italy is one of the largest centers of Hwa Rang Do in the world with over a dozen Academies and clubs.

It was also in 1990 that the World Hwa Rang Do Association introduced an introductory program to help new students learn and develop their skills in a more sport-like atmosphere. The program was named Tae Soo Do (Way of the Warrior Spirit: 태수도; 太手道). Students who learn Tae Soo Do learn the basic fundamentals of kicking and punching. They are also introduced to beginner level sweeps, throws, and locks. A black belt in Tae Soo Do has the same level of quality as a black belt in other martial arts including Tae Kwon Do and Karate. Once a student has a Black belt, they receive an honorary Yellow sash in the color ranks of Hwa Rang Do.

=== Modernization in the 21st century ===
The founder, Joo Bang Lee, indicated in an interview with Black Belt magazine in 2000 that Hwa Rang Do shares similar soft-style joint locks, grappling techniques, and throws with Hapkido and Daitō-ryū Aiki-jūjutsu. However in the following years of 2000s, Henry Taejoon Lee headed operations to expand and grow the application programs within Hwa Rang Do to add aspects of modern combat sports (such as kickboxing and ground grappling sparring/competition) to keep their students competitive with the larger martial art community and to expand their understanding beyond the aspects of the traditional core material, which were historically more similar to other traditional martial arts like Hapkido.

- Gotoogi: Solid Fighting Skill (고투기; 固鬪技): Gotoogi is a grappling program that was introduced to teach students fundamentals of ground fighting, opponent control, throws and takedowns, and lockouts in a competitive setting. Unlike the traditional techniques and training methods of Hwarangdo, Gotoogi avoids dangerous techniques like small joint manipulation and focuses on sparring and competition.
- Gumtoogi: Blade Fighting Skill (검투기; 劍鬪技): Gumtoogi is a sword sparring program similar to Korean Kumdo, but with leg strikes and spin attacks. Students who participate in Gumtoogi use similar equipment that they use in Kumdo, but with additional armor added to protect the legs. Both long sword (Juk-do) and twin swords (ssang kum) are used within competition.
- Bongtoogi: Stick Fighting Skill (봉투기; 棒鬪技): Bongtoogi is a stick sparring program that allows students to learn how to fight with both long staff (Jang Bong) and double mid-sticks (ssang bong) within a competitive setting. Students who train in Bongtoogi use the same uniforms and armor as students who train in Gumtoogi.

Depending on the strengths of the instructors at the academies, certain programs will have a larger emphasis than others. However, these programs are standard with all WHRDA licensed academies.

=== 2010 to present ===
Depending on the school, Hwa Rang Do academies and clubs will either stay truer to the traditional aspects of the art, focusing more on the core material and traditional self-defense or they will embrace the expanded application programs and work to grow their skills within a competitive sport environment. Many clubs and academies, however, look to find a balance between the two. WHRDA has continued its development of the sports applications by improving the quality of the Gotoogi, Gumtoogi, and Bongtoogi programs as well as introducing an advanced sparring program called Yongtoogi (Courageous Fighting Skill: 용투기; 勇鬪技). Yongtoogi was initially introduced in 2012 and has become the standard for all Hwa Rang Do color sash and black sash sparring. Yongtoogi consist of full round, semi-contact sparring, with kickboxing, throws, and ground submissions. Also in 2011, the World Hwa Rang Do Association applied for 501c3 not-for-profit tax status. “Our desire to expand our humanitarian work around the globe led to the change,” said Grandmaster Taejoon Lee, President of the World Hwa Rang Do Association. Many of the members of WHRDA participate in public self-defense clinics, humanitarian organizations like the Peace Corp, as well as other independent humanitarian missions both locally and internationally to help with this cause.

== Philosophy ==
=== Hwa Rang Do Maeng Se ===
Hwa Rang Do, in addition to its martial training, teaches moral principles with the belief that those who receive martial arts training must also be taught to use their skills responsibly. The foundation of Hwa Rang Do's code of ethics is the Hwa Rang Do Maeng Se (맹세), composed of the O Gye, and the Gyo Hun. The Hwarang O Gye is rooted in the ancient warrior code originally developed by a Buddhist monk known as Won Gwang Beop Sa in the Three Kingdoms period. This code included loyalty to one's Lord, piety to your parents, trust among friends, courage in battle, and discrimination in killing. Because of the changes in political structures in both Korea and the Americas, Joo Bang Lee updated the English translation to reflect modern society. In addition to these five rules, he developed the Gyo Hun to support the O Gye.

The five rules and nine philosophical principles of Hwa Rang Do.

O Gye: 오계 (Five Rules of Hwa Rang Do)
Numbers (1-5)	Rules in Korean (Hangul)	Translation
Il	사군이충: Sa Gun I Chung	Loyalty to one's country
I	사친이효: Sa Chin I Hyo	Loyalty to one's parents and teachers
Sam	교우이신: Gyo U I Sin	Trust and brotherhood among friends
Sa	임전무퇴: Im Jeon Mu Toe	Courage never to retreat in the face of the enemy
O	살생유택: Sal Saeng Yu Taek	Justice never to take a life without a cause

Gyo Hun: 교훈 (Nine Virtues of Hwa Rang Do)
Korean (Hangul)	English
인: In	Humanity
의: Ui	Justice
예: Ye	Courtesy
지: Ji	Wisdom
신: Sin	Trust
선: Seon	Goodness
덕: Deok	Virtue
충: Chung	Loyalty
용: Yong	Courage

=== Seven principles of training ===
In addition to the Maeng Se, the Mul Sul practices of Hwa Rang Do follow what is known as the Seven Principles of Training. They are:

1. Concentration
2. Patience and Endurance
3. Sincerity in Practice
4. Speed
5. Conservation of Energy
6. Respect and Obedience
7. Humility (Lack of vanity)

== Martial system overview: Mu Sul ==
=== Four categories of training ===
Within the martial systems known as Mu Sul, a practitioner will learn various forms, techniques, and sparring methods. They will also learn meditation methods and mental-character development. The core traditional Mu Sul practices are divided into four categories:

Nae Gong (internal power): Nae Gong involves specific meditation practices that help with relaxation, building power, and increasing one's physical performance of the art. These meditation methods are divided into both passive (Eum) and active (Yang) methods. These meditative practices are seen as ways for practitioners to break past their perceived limitations and perform extraordinary feats!

Oe Gong (external power): Oe Gong is the physical part of the martial art where one takes what one has cultivated through Nae Gong practices and applies them. Oe Gong is divided into 21 areas of focus, including long and short forms, basic striking techniques, kicking test, and various self-defense techniques including defense against grabs and holds, defense against kicks, joint locks, throws, sweeps, and open handed defenses against various types of weapons. In addition to these, practitioners of Hwa Rang Do take advantage of the various sparring systems to truly test their skills in a dynamic and non-staged environment. These systems include sport-like point sparring system, situational awareness defense drills, full round semi-full contact sparring (Yongtoogi), and ground fighting with throws (Gotoogi).

Mugi Gong (weapons power): Mugi Gong is the weapons training portion of Hwa Rang Do. Various techniques and forms using weapons are taught including Ssang Jeol Bong (nunchaku), Jang Bong (long staff), and the Jang Geom (sword). Defense against other weapons, such as the knife (Dan Geom), short stick (Dan Bong), and cane are taught, but training with those weapons does not occur until black sash ranks. Traditionally, there are 20 different weapon categories that are taught at the master levels whose methods can be expanded out to include 108 traditional weapons. To keep up with their skills in weapons, there are also various sparring programs that students can use to test their skills. These include situational awareness defense drills, traditional Asian sword sparring (Gumtoogi) and Asian stick sparring (Bongtoogi).

Sin Gong (mental power): Sin Gong involves developing control over the human mind by cultivating focus and concentration, awareness of both yourself and others, and personal character development within the Hwarang honor systems. In addition to coming to a deeper understanding of Hwa Rang Do's Maeng Se, there are traditionally 13 sub-categories of Sin Gong which include learning basic Asian emergency medical practices, methods of hermitage, methods of concealment as well as studying Asian models of psychology and philosophy.

=== Curriculum: belt/sash rank system ===
Unlike many other martial arts, Hwa Rang Do, with the Tae Soo Do introductory program, has three levels of training. Each level has its own curriculum and belt ranking system. With this structure, a student will receive a black belt upon graduating into the next tier of training (excluding the Black Sash Ranks in the upper tier).

Color belts & sashes
Mu Geup
Pal Geup
Chil Geup
Yuk Geup
O Geup
Sa Geup
Sam Geup
I Geup
Il Geup

Tae Soo Do Belt Ranks:

Within the Tae Soo Do program, practitioners will have belts to mark their progression in the art. The belt system in Tae Soo Do consists of 9 ranks, each with its own curriculum. Training at this level can take 3–5 years before a student receives their black belt and students work to not only develop an understanding of the fundamentals in the martial program, but they actively train to apply what they learn through various application methods. These belt ranks include:

- White Belt: Mu Geup (ninth grade)
- Orange Belt: Pal Geup (eighth grade)
- Yellow Belt: Chil Geup (seventh grade)
- Green Belt: Yuk Geup (sixth grade)
- Purple Belt: O Geup (fifth grade)
- Blue Belt: Sa Geup (fourth grade)
- Brown Belt: Sam Geup (third grade)
- Red Belt: I Geup (second grade)
- Half-black Belt: Il Geup (first grade)

Each Belt consists of an open hand long form, basic attack techniques, kicking test, sets of defensive techniques, weapons forms at Yellow Belt, Blue Belt, and Half-Black Belt, as well as sparring methods which include a sport-like point sparring program and a ground fighting grappling program (Gotoogi). There is also weapons sparring available to Tae Soo Do students, but this is optional depending on the school and academy.

Hwa Rang Do Color Sash Ranks:

Once a student has graduated the Tae Soo Do program, they receive their black belt and begin the color sash ranks in Hwa Rang Do. Once a student begins their training in Hwa Rang Do, the focus of the training shifts to provide a deeper understanding of the material and show a greater diversity of applications one can use. At one point, there were 9 ranks of color sashes, but with the inclusion of Tae Soo Do, much of the material that was in the first two sashes were similar to Tae Soo Do, so advancements through those ranks were removed. Students are still required to learn the material, but the information is now part of the training at Yellow Sash. Depending on the student, training at this level can take 7–12 years before a student can become a Cho Dan (First degree Black Sash). The color sash rank system includes:

- Yellow Sash: Chil Geup (seventh grade)
- Green Sash: Yuk Geup (sixth grade)
- Purple Sash: O Geup (fifth grade)
- Blue Sash: Sa Geup (fourth grade)
- Brown Sash: Sam Geup (third grade)
- Red Sash: I Geup (second grade)
- Half-black sash: Il Geup (first grade)

Each Sash consist of an open hand long form, basic attack techniques, a set of defensive techniques, kicking test, short forms, and sparring methods, which will include full round semi-contact sparring, submission grappling (Gotoogi), and weapons sparring with blades and sticks. There are also weapons forms at Yellow sash, Blue Sash, and Half-Black sash as it is in Tae Soo Do.

Black sash ranks
Cho Dan
I Dan
Sam Dan
Sa Dan
O Dan
Yuk Dan
Chil Dan
Pal Dan

Hwa Rang Do Black Sash Ranks:

After receiving a black sash, a practitioner earns the title Jo Gyo Nim (assistant instructor). In addition, every degree of black sash has its own title and has its respective knowledge level with curriculum. Note: Ninth and tenth degrees black sashes are honorary positions and there can only ever be one of each at any one time within the organization.

- First degree black sash. Title: Jo Gyo Nim (Assistant Instructor)
- Second degree black sash. Title: Gyo Sa Nim (Junior Instructor/ Teacher)
- Third degree black sash. Title: Sa Beom Nim (Main Instructor)
- Fourth degree black sash. Title: Suseok Sa Beom Nim (Head/ Chief Instructor)
- Fifth degree black sash. Title: Gwan Jang Nim (Master)
- Sixth degree black sash. Title: Gwan Jang Nim or Do Sa Nim, or Dosa (Different types of Masters)
- Seventh degree black sash. Title: Suseok Gwan Jang Nim (Head/ Chief Master)
- Eighth degree black sash. Title: Guk Sa Nim or Chong Gwan Jang Nim (Grandmaster)
- Ninth degree black sash (Gu Dan). Title: Guk Seon Nim (Head Grandmaster, Honorary)
- Tenth degree black sash (Sip Dan). Title: Do Ju Nim (Supreme Grandmaster, Keeper of the Way, Honorary)

When a student moves into the Black Sash ranks, they dive deeper into the material they have learned up to this point and there is a stronger emphasis on weapons training, meditation practices, and specialized skill sets in various area of training. The material at each sash at this point can vary greatly, but will at least consist of an open hand long form and various sets of defensive techniques.

=== Tournaments and competitions ===
Students in Hwa Rang Do and Tae Soo Do have the opportunity to compete in tournaments throughout the year. In the United States, tournaments are performed by academies and are hosted on a local and state level. There are also regional and national tournaments in the US and in other countries. Once a year, the World Hwa Rang Do Association host the Hwa Rang Do World Tournaments which coincides with their World Conferences each summer. The format and divisions for tournaments are determined by WHRDA with many different options for competition. Students are not required to compete in all divisions, but they are encouraged to participate in as much as possible. Tournament divisions include:

- Open-hand Forms
- Weapons Forms
- Tae Soo Do Point Sparring
- Hwa Rang Do Yongtoogi (full round, semi-contact) Sparring
- Gotoogi Position and Submission Grappling
- Gumtoogi and Bongtoogi Weapons Sparring
- Shibum Free Form Demo Competition

All rules and regulations are presented in the Hwa Rang Do M.A.S.T.E.R. Rules, Gotoogi Rules, and the Shibum Rules.

== Meditative and healing practices: Ki Gong and In Sul ==
Hwa Rang Do, in addition to its martial practices also includes various types of traditional Korean meditation practices that have various functions as well as introductory training in Asian Medicine. The meditation methods are divided into active (Yang) and passive (Um) practices.

=== Active meditation: Yang Ki Gong ===
The active meditation practices are developed to help practitioners build physical strength, flexibility, and intensity in focus through isometric practices. Within the curriculum, there are 7 different methods used.

=== Passive meditation: Um Ki Gong ===
The passive meditation practices are developed to help practitioners focus the mind, cultivate stillness, and help relax the body. These practices are similar to Korean Buddhist and Taoist meditation practices, which include 5 different postures or mantras to represent the 5 elements in Taoist philosophy.

=== Healing methods: In Sul ===
Joo Bang Lee has stated that if you learn to cause harm, you must also learn how to heal. Hwa Rang Do also offers training in Traditional Asian Medicine through its World Headquarters. Whether an individual club or academy offers such training though depends on the Head Instructor and whether they are certified to teach such practices. The healing skills in Hwa Rang Do are divided into 6 categories:

- Ji Ap Sul – Acupressure
- Chim Gu Sul – Acupuncture and Moxibustion
- Yak Bang Beop – Herbal Medicine
- Jeop Gol Sul – Bone Setting
- Hwal Beop – Special Aids
- Gi Ryeok Sul – Ki Power healing

Through the study of both the martial and healing skills in Hwa Rang Do, a practitioner will have an understanding of the strengths and weaknesses of the human body. This will not only help in a self-defense situation, but will also help the practitioner to understand and appreciate the value of human life and this type of understanding is crucial to the further development of their character.
