= Kenko Kempo Karate =

Hybrid martial art system

Kenko Kempo Karate is a hybrid martial art system aimed at people over 40 years of age. It is a methodology to adapt Eastern martial arts to the needs of persons of advanced age, for both novices as well as experienced practitioners. It aims at health, wellness, and self-defense. The system can be adapted to most martial arts but consistently uses tai chi forms as part of the training program.

Kenko Kempo Karate is registered as an association in Germany as well as the Netherlands where the Netherlands Federation for Martial Arts accepted it within its elderly martial arts initiative.

== History ==
Kenko Kempo Karate was formed in Germany in 2011 by Erich B. Ries. Ries, founded it to improve the accessibility of martial arts for novices and advanced practitioners, who want to work towards a black belt, when this is not possible in the classical Eastern martial arts. Kenko Kempo Karate is a hybrid martial art with hard martial arts techniques in addition to qigong and tai chi. Kenko Kempo Karate intends to function in the field of preventive healthcare for the second half of life (with self-defence), as a health-supportive lifelong training program. Kenko Kempo Karate does not intend to be of therapeutic value, as Ai Chi does, which also includes qigong and tai chi.

Teachers of Kenko Kempo Karate are certified by the professional organisation Kenko Kempo Karate Organisation e.V. (KKKO), with contact persons in Austria, parts of Germany and the Netherlands.

== Characteristics ==
Kenko Kempo Karate shares the autonomy of the certified teacher with Kajukenbo, another hybrid martial arts system. The cross-style methodology of Kenko Kempo Karate is reflected in the schools and styles that use it for teaching: jiu-jitsu, judo, kenjutsu, quan-fa, taekwon-do, wing chun, and Shotokan karate.

The Kenko Kempo Karate curriculum combines techniques of internal and external Martial Arts in each training session with content based on four pillars:

- QiGong exercises;
- Adapted gymnastics and warming-up;
- A short tai chi form: 9-Yang and one short self-defense kata Kenko Kempo;
- Basic Martial Arts techniques, including easy but effective self-protection.

The program includes the whole road from white belt to 3rd black belt, aiming at pleasure, safety and health while taking into account possible restrictions experienced by the individual practitioner. It may be characterized as follows:

1. The aim of training is wellness, physical, mental and social health and self-protection;
2. Individual aspirations and restrictions of the participants form the basis of a training in Kenko Kempo Karate;
3. The warming-up phase of weekly group training is at least 20 minutes in each session;
4. In each training session external techniques alternate with internal Martial Arts techniques;
5. High and twisting kicks are omitted to protect the joints of ankle, knee and hip;
6. No peak load on the heart-lung system during training;
7. Participants are stimulated to train daily the internal techniques of qigong and tai chi for 10 minutes or more;
8. Grading depends on individual growth in skill and knowledge and NOT on a fixed list of required techniques for all;
9. Evaluation for a higher kyu is made by one's own teacher, because s/he was able to observe the personal growth in skill and knowledge;
10. There are no competitions.

== See also ==
- Hybrid martial arts
- Kajukenbo
