= Graciela Casillas =

American boxer and kickboxer

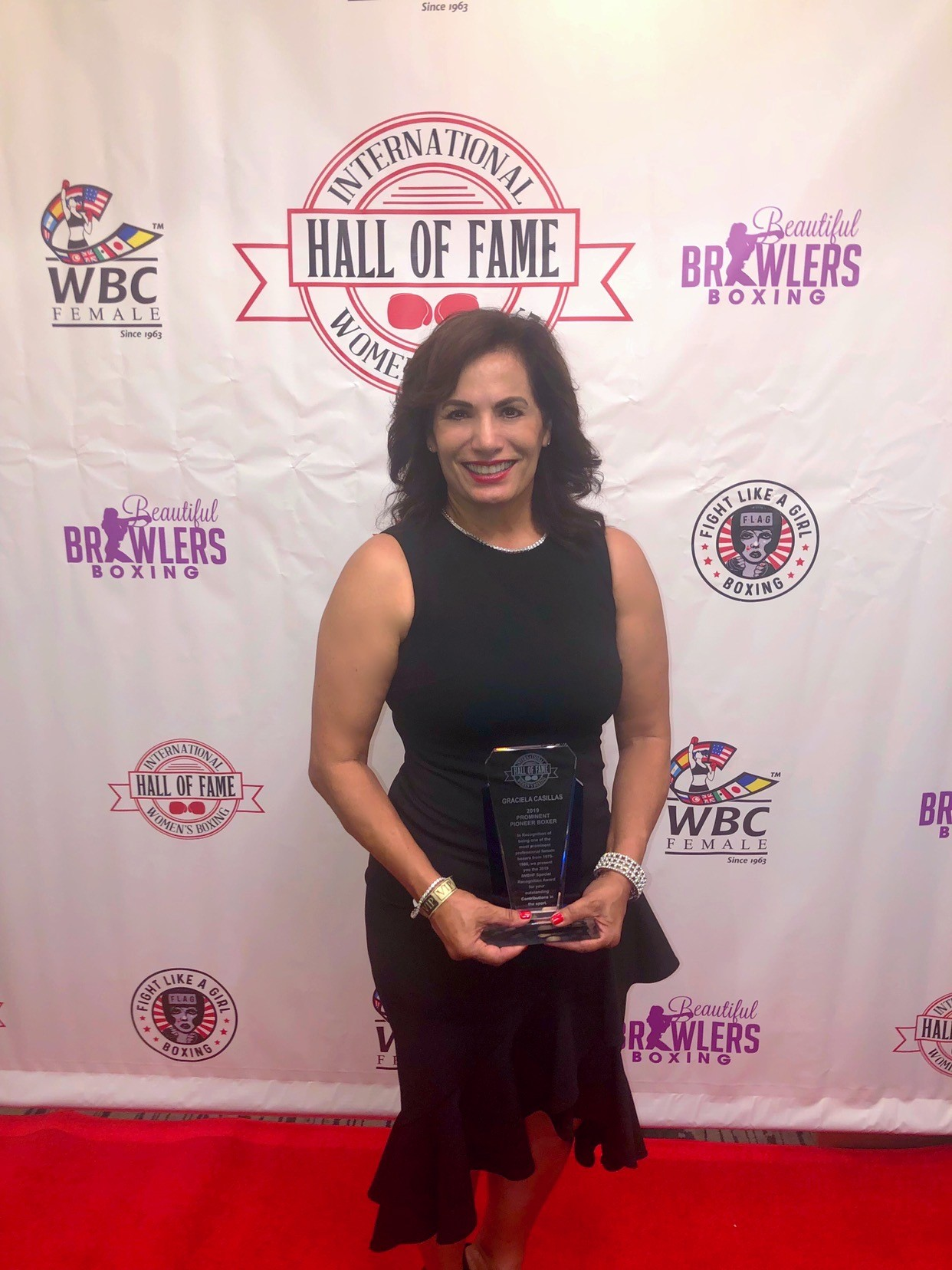
- Casillas at Women's Boxing International Hall of Fame
- Born: 1957 (age 68–69); Oxnard, California, United States
- Other names: The Goddess
- Height: 1.63 m (5 ft 4 in)
- Weight: 53 kg (117 lb; 8.3 st)
- Division: Bantamweight
- Style: Kickboxing, Shen Chun Do, American Kenpo, Jeet Kune Do, Hwa Rang Do, Eskrima, Jujutsu, Taekwondo, Boxing
- Fighting out of: Santa Monica, California
- Team: Olympic Gym
- Trainer: Jimmy Montoya
- Rank: 3rd degree black belt in American Kenpo; 3rd degree black belt in Kodenkan Jujutsu; 10th degree black belt in Shen Chun Do
- Years active: 1976-1986

Professional boxing record
- Total: 6
- Wins: 5
- By knockout: 2
- Losses: 0
- Draws: 1

Kickboxing record
- Total: 32
- Wins: 31
- By knockout: 18
- Losses: 0
- Draws: 1

Graciela Casillas (born 1957) is an American former boxer and kickboxer who competed in the bantamweight division. After training in several traditional martial arts, Casillas began competing as a kickboxer in 1976, and in 1979 she became the first fighter to hold world titles in both boxing and kickboxing by taking the World Women's Boxing Association's and the World Kickboxing Association's bantamweight championships. Although Casillas' Boxrec record is 5–0, Black Belt Magazine reported in May 1984 that she had 27 boxing matches, winning 15 by KO up to that point.

Noted for her punching power and also as one of the first American fighters to incorporate low kicks into their arsenal, Casillas retired undefeated in 1986. She is considered a pioneer of women's combat sports. Casillas was inducted into the International Women's Boxing Hall of Fame in 2020.

== Early life ==
Casillas was born as one of eleven children to Mexican parents in Oxnard, California. She took up taekwondo at the age of fifteen when the church she attended began offering self-defense classes. After the classes were discontinued, she began training in Hwa Rang Do and then American Kenpo karate. It was at her karate school where she was introduced to kickboxing.

== Career ==
After going 6–0 with all of her wins by knockout as an amateur, Casillas turned professional in 1977. On June 13, 1979, after winning her first eight professional full contact karate fights, she defeated Karen Bennett by unanimous decision at the Grand Olympic Auditorium in Los Angeles, California to win the WWBA World Bantamweight (-53.525 kg/118 lb) Championship in what was her professional boxing debut.

Later that year, on December 23, she beat Irene Garcia to take the WKA Women's World Bantamweight (-53.5 kg/117.9 lb) title in Las Vegas, Nevada. This made her the first person to hold world titles in boxing and kickboxing simultaneously.

In a controversial bout in Chicago, Illinois on October 6, 1981, Casillas went the distance with Cheryl Wheeler. Initially, it was announced that Wheeler won on the judges' scorecards to take the WKA bantamweight title but it was later overturned to a win for Casillas.

She retired undefeated in 1986 with a record of 31–0, 18 KOs.

After, retirement Casillas taught martial arts at Oxnard College. She also pursued a different career route when she decided to go into the counseling department at Oxnard College. Now, Casillas is the Counseling Dept Chair at Oxnard College, and occasionally teaches courses in the PE Department.

== Personal life ==
Casillas has spent the years following her retirement from competition developing her own eclectic martial art of Shen Chun Do, "the way of the warrior spirit".

Originally a student of taekwondo and full-contact karate she earned a 3rd degree black belt in Kenpo as well as Kodenkan Jujitsu. Casillas trained under Grandmaster Angel Cabales and became the first woman instructor for Cabales Serrada Eskrima. She later studied Jeet Kune Do under Sifu Dan Inosanto and Arnis under Grandmaster Bobby Taboada and her husband Sensei Ernie Boggs. She has been President of the United States Sport Jujitsu Trade Association and an assistant coach to the USA Jujitsu Team. She was awarded Black Belt Magazine's and Inside Kung-Fu Magazine's "Woman of the Year" in 1989 and inducted into the Martial Arts Hall of Fame. In 2020, she was inducted into the International Women's Boxing Hall of Fame. She has been credited as the designer of the Boxing Skirt.

In 1996 Casillas designed a knife known as the Ladyhawk, manufactured by Masters of Defense (MOD) as a collaboration with Microtech Knives and marketed as a self-defense knife designed for women. Impetus for this design came after Casillas stabbed one of two attempted rapists, using the thug's own knife after disarming him.

Casillas has appeared in the films Full Impact (1993) and Fire in the Night (1986).

== Championships and awards ==
=== Boxing ===
- World Women's Boxing Association
  - WWBA World Bantamweight (-53.525 kg/118 lb) Championship

=== Kickboxing ===
- World Kickboxing Association
  - WKA Women's World Bantamweight (-53.5 kg/117.9 lb) Championship

== Boxing record ==
Boxing record
5 wins (2 KOs), 0 losses, 1 draw
Date	Result	Opponent	Venue	Location	Method	Round	Time	Record
1986-02-25	Win	(United States) Tanya McCloud	The Forum	Inglewood, California, US	Decision (unanimous)	4	2:00	5-0-1
1983-01-27	Win	(United States) Lanay Browning		Las Vegas, Nevada, US	KO	3		4-0-1
1980-09-18	Win	(United States) Debra Wright		Tucson, Arizona, US	KO	3		3-0-1
1980-06-25	Win	(United States) Anna Pascal	Silver Slipper	Paradise, Nevada, US	Decision (unanimous)	6	2:00	2-0-1
1979-11-23	Draw	(United States) Karen Bennett	San Diego Coliseum	San Diego, California, US	Draw			1-0-1
1979-07-13	Win	(United States) Karen Bennett	Grand Olympic Auditorium	Los Angeles, California, US	Decision (unanimous)	6	2:00	1-0
Wins the WWBA World Bantamweight (-53.525 kg/118 lb) Championship.
Legend: Win Loss Draw/No contest Notes

== Kickboxing record ==
Kickboxing record
31 wins (18 KOs), 0 losses, 1 draw
Date	Result	Opponent	Event	Location	Method	Round	Time
1981-10-06	Win	(United States) Cheryl Wheeler		Chicago, Illinois, US	Decision	7	2:00
Retains the WKA Women's World Bantamweight (-53.5 kg/117.9 lb) Championship.
1981-04-09	Win	(Hong Kong) Chan Lai Yin		Hong Kong	TKO		
1981-03-10	Win	(United States) Cookie Melendez			Decision	7	2:00
Retains the WKA Women's World Bantamweight (-53.5 kg/117.9 lb) Championship.
1980-10-18	Win	(United States) Darlina Valdez			Decision	7	2:00
Retains the WKA Women's World Bantamweight (-53.5 kg/117.9 lb) Championship.
1980-06-16	Win	(Mexico) Darlena Valdez		Mexico	Decision	7	2:00
Retains the WKA Women's World Bantamweight (-53.5 kg/117.9 lb) Championship.
1980-03-29	Win	(United States) Rochelle Reggsdale			TKO		
Retains the WKA Women's World Bantamweight (-53.5 kg/117.9 lb) Championship.
1979-12-23	Win	(United States) Irene Garcia		Las Vegas, Nevada, US	Decision	7	2:00
Wins the WKA Women's World Bantamweight (-53.5 kg/117.9 lb) Championship.
1979-11-16	Win	(United States) Gina Troy			Decision		
1978-12-29	Win	(United States) Gina Troy			TKO		
1978-09-01	Draw	(United States) Valerie Gardner			Draw		
1978-07-29	Win	(United States) Linda Costineda			TKO		
1978-01-21	Win	(United States) Jeanie Harris			TKO		
1977-06-26	Win	(United States) Cheryl Altmore			KO		
1977-05-14	Win	(United States) Ana Maria Garza			TKO		
1977-02-12	Win	(United States) Joanna Mitchell			TKO		
1976-10-23	Win	(United States) Crystal Lee			TKO		
Legend: Win Loss Draw/No contest Notes

== See also ==
- List of female boxers
- List of female kickboxers
