= Unified Weapons Master =

- Focus: Hybrid weapons-based combat
- Creator: Chiron Global

Unified Weapons Master, or UWM, is a hybrid martial art developed by the Australian start-up firm Chiron Global using Smart technology in a gladiator-style, carbon-fiber armored suit. UWM is the first sport that combines Gaming technology with weapons-based Combat sports. The armored suit technology, also known as “The Lorica suit”, completely protects its user's body while electronic sensors record an opponent's strike position and power on the body. Opponents use a variety of martial arts and weaponry to attack each other and software keeps score of the damage that would have been done to an unprotected body.

The Lorica suit derives its name from the Latin word Lorica literally meaning “body armor”. Also, the name references various armor types of the Roman army such as the Lorica segmentata.

== Background ==
Forsell first envisioned UWM when attending while training krabi-krabong at the Buddhai Swan Sword Fencing Institute in Bangkok. While there, Forsell envisioned a forum for all the world's myriad weapons-based martial arts to be practiced at once. Weapons-based martial arts have been practiced globally throughout history and, although most have died out due to modernizing warfare, there are ninety-six arts still practiced. Yet there is no platform for cross-discipline challenges to objectively determine a winner. In addition, full-contact fighters using weapons are near impossible since, “barring all-out death matches, there’s really no way for weapons based martial artists to really test their skills.” The founders therefore sought to establish one single arena for comprehensive competition.

== Team ==
Unified Weapons Master was founded by David Pysden, J Forsell and Samantha English, each with backgrounds in several industries including martial arts and software engineering. Forsell specifically has extensive background in full-contact, semi-contact and weapons-based martial arts. Other technical experts include gaming and film consultants, as well as medical consultants with anatomical expertise. Pysden has stated "Our vision is to reignite interest in weapons-based martial arts that have been practised and developed over thousands of years". The suit developers include experienced armorers, prop-makers, and mold makers, while the software is run by several engineers and programmers.

== Business model ==
Pysden has stated that UWM's investors are private and has not disclosed the series A funding amount. As of July 2014, UWM had completed a series A round of funding, also for an undisclosed amount. In 2015, Chiron launched a project titled “Indiegogo” to raise additional capital while raising awareness. To date it has raised around USD $50,000 of their goal of $72,000.

== Lorica technology ==
UWM features “The Lorica” combat suit: an intelligent carbon-fiber suit of armor with advanced levels of protection and biometrics to measure heart-rate and temperature. In addition the suit includes forty electronic pressure sensors on the inside which record any strikes made against the armor. The armor software calculates the force and location of each strike on the suit and calculates the damage that would be done on an unarmored body, which is recorded in real-time. The software uses an anatomical fracture profile and a database of body injuries to determine and display in-match damage.

The UWM Lorica suit will allow weapons-based competitions to be held for any martial artist. Competitors are designated a “life force” for each round which is diminished with each successful strike from the opponent. Bouts end when one competitor's life force falls to zero or if time runs out, in which case the competitor with more life force left is the winner.

A helmet camera and microphone allow viewers to witness the full experience of combatants. It also allows communication between competitors and coaches.

== Goals ==
UWM is hopeful that the first competitions will be held before the end of 2015. Initially these will be smaller events to serve as beta-testing to search for bugs in the software. Once improved, UWM intends to launch on a larger, eventually global scale. Psyden has also expressed his belief that UWN will “instantly resonate with a television audience”.

Competitors from any martial arts discipline can compete around the globe. UWM hopes to become a worldwide sport to be practiced among martial arts experts to seek champions across all disciplines. In addition, the Lorica can allow for competition between martial artists of all levels. Pysden has also stated “the Lorica suit is the first opportunity to see some of the most ancient weapons-based martial arts showcased in the modern era”.

Pysden has also stated that besides the immediate use of weapons-based martial arts, there are long term applications among military and law enforcement training. "In the longer term we could see this even going into gyms," Pysden has said.

Chiron intends to create a next generation of The Lorica that is about a third the weight of the current generation. Once challenge the Chiron team faces is implementing edged weapons into its metrics. Blunted weapons are easily recorded in their anatomical metrics, whereas edged weapons will require further development.
