= Tae Soo Do =

Martial art systems or martial arts program

- Also known as: Taekwondo Hwa Rang Do
- Country of origin: Korea

- Tae Soo Do
- Hangul: 태수도
- RR: Taesudo
- MR: T'aesudo

Tae Soo Do is a name that has been used over the years by both the Taekwondo and the Hwa Rang Do communities. In relation to Taekwondo, it was the name that some major schools in South Korea agreed to call their martial art systems due to reactions to controversies within the Taekwondo communities in the early 1960s. In relation to Hwa Rang Do, Tae Soo Do is the name of their introductory program to help students develop their fundamentals and help prepare them for their training in Hwa Rang Do. Modern day Tae Soo Do/ Hwa Rang Do has no connection with Taekwondo and one should not be mistaken for the other.

== Previous Use in Relation to Taekwondo ==
In 1961, the name Taekwondo was temporarily dropped by members of the Taekwondo community due to controversies that arose between various schools and practitioners. In response to these controversies, several of the schools choose to change the name of their art to Tae Soo Do and The Korea Tae Soo Do Association submitted its documented to the Ministry of Education on September 22, 1961. A general in the Korean military and a predominant member of the Taekwondo community, Choi Hong Hi, was unhappy with this change and in 1965, he succeeded in changing the name of the art back to Taekwondo with the reformation of The Korean Taekwondo Association.

Today, the name Tae Soo Do is no longer used by Taekwondo practitioners or schools. Very few people who practice Taekwondo today will recognize the name except for its modern use with the Hwa Rang Do community. In the west, the art was always referred to as "Tae Kwon Do" (or "Taekwondo", the western form of the name), due to that the controversies that happened in Korea during the early 1960s never made their way over to the United States aside from a very select few, who chose to watch eastern culture and events closely in order to keep traditions alive and accurate.

== Modern Use in Relation to Hwa Rang Do ==
Today, the name Tae Soo Do (Way of the Warrior Spirit, Korean: 태수도; Hanja: 太手道) refers to a martial art program created in 1990 by the World Hwa Rang Do Association as a beginners program to the martial art system Hwa Rang Do. The World Hwa Rang Do Association decided to use the name because functionally it expressed what they were working to achieve with the students who participate within the program and since it had been rejected outright by General Choi and the Taekwondo community decades earlier, they didn't see an issue using it.
