= Special Combat Aggressive Reactionary System =

Self defense method

S.C.A.R.S.
- Symbol for the S.C.A.R.S. program
- Also known as: Special Combat Aggressive Reactionary Systems
- Focus: Combat Fighting
- Country of origin: United States
- Creator: Jerry L. Peterson
- Olympic sport: No
- Official website: SCARS

Special Combat Aggressive Reactionary Systems (SCARS) is an American combat fighting system created by Jerry L. Peterson.

== History ==
SCARS is based on sciences of psychology, physiology, physical movement as well as research on the nervous system. SCARS was developed by Peterson after serving two tours in the US Army 173rd Airborne Brigade during the Vietnam War. It was debuted in 1987, and began to be taught to various military, law enforcement, and security units, such as the Arizona State police. Currently, SCARS is taught through private seminars, larger scale contracts, online training and DVDs. It contains no defensive actions, as all checks against the enemy's kicks or punches are delivered as strikes to vulnerable nerves.

The program is based upon the idea that every human body reacts in the same way to specific injuries, and the program puts together various strikes to specific nerves, bones, and organs in order to debilitate an aggressive individual. The goal is to produce an "autokinematic reaction", creating a spinal reflex that happens in all humans. For example, if struck with kinetic force above the solar plexus, the upper body will react moving backwards. If struck below the solar plexus in the same way with kinetic force the body will buckle or the head will come forward. This reaction has nothing to do with pain, although it may hurt after the spinal reflex. It has everything to do with your spine reacting to protect your body. The three main elements of SCARS are geometry, physiology, and physics, and avoids the spiritual aspect that is prevalent in many martial arts.

=== Government personnel training programs ===
SCARS manual cover

SCARS was initially presented to the Department of the Navy in 1988. SCARS Institute of Combat Sciences has developed training courses for the US Army and Air Force, as well as foreign governments and various law enforcement agencies. For the first seven years the fighting system remained exclusively known to and practiced by US Special Forces. The program was taught via seminars, government contracts, and also the SCARS Institute of Combative Sciences, once known as "the most expensive school in the world".

The US Navy developed a training manual for teaching SCARS to members of the Navy and SEALs. It states in its introduction that it was used as "an educational system dealing primarily with the thought process in high risk areas of combat" and meant to "increase an individual's decision making skills in high stress areas of conflict".

=== Public education ===
In 1993, the company produced video programming to teach its techniques to the general public. Live seminars are also available to the public in which are taught reliable hand to hand, and hand to weapons combat techniques over the span of three days. The remainder of the Navy program was not released to the public in the videos or otherwise. The videos were first distributed in 1993 as the most expensive collection of defense videos ever produced; however, they sold a large number of copies, and grossed $1 million in the first nine months. In 1999 a SCARS TV program was scripted and cast, though it was not produced. Blake Peterson also published the book Attention! Teachers, Students and Parents! Survive the Unsurvivable! - What Science Tells Us About Fear, Self-Defense, School Shootings and Why Guns in Schools Might Not Be the Best Solution in 2013, using SCARS as the basis for teaching supervisory figures how to deal with the increasing gun violence in US schools.

=== Cancellation by US Military ===
By March 1998, internal Naval Special Warfare Command documents confirmed that the time commitment for the 30-day course meant that no units of Naval Special Warfare Command had been trained in the SCARS system in over two years; on April 17, 1998, the SCARS course was cancelled by Naval Special Warfare Command. As of 2011, the Naval Special Warfare Command had implemented mixed martial arts inspired combat training.

== See also ==
- Modern Army Combatives
- Close-quarters combat
- Hand-to-hand combat
- LINE (combat system)
- Marine Corps Martial Arts Program
