= Hand-to-hand combat =

Fighting without ranged weapons

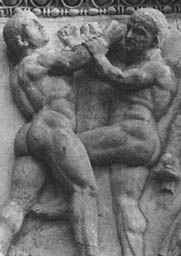
Pankratiasts portrayed on a Roman relief. 2nd or 3rd century A.D.

Hand-to-hand combat is a physical confrontation between two or more persons at short range (grappling distance or within the reach of a handheld weapon). Handheld weapons may include knives, swords, clubs, spears, axes, or improvised weapons such as entrenching tools. While the term "hand-to-hand combat" originally referred principally to engagements by combatants on the battlefield, it can also refer to any personal physical engagement by two or more people, including law enforcement officers, civilians, and criminals.

Combat within close quarters, to a range just beyond grappling distance, is commonly termed close combat or close-quarters combat. It may include lethal and non-lethal weapons and methods, depending upon restrictions imposed by civilian law, military rules of engagement, or ethical codes. Close combat using firearms or other distance weapons by military combatants at the tactical level is referred to in contemporary parlance as close-quarters battle. The United States Army uses the term combatives to describe various military fighting systems used in hand-to-hand combat training, systems which may incorporate eclectic techniques from several different martial arts and combat sports.

== History ==
Hand-to-hand combat is the most ancient form of fighting known. A majority of cultures have their own particular histories related to close combat, and their own methods of practice. The pankration, which was practiced in Ancient Greece and Rome, is an example of a form which involved nearly all strikes and holds, with biting and gouging being the only exceptions (although allowed in Sparta). Many modern varieties of martial arts and combat sports, such as some boxing styles, wrestling and MMA, were also practiced historically. For example, Celtic wrestling is mentioned in the Tailteann Games dating back from somewhere between 1839 BC to 632 BC (academics disagree) to the 12th century AD when the Normans invaded. Other historical forms of close combat include the gladiator spectacles of ancient Rome and medieval tournament events such as jousting or medieval martial arts.

Military organizations have always taught some sort of unarmed combat for conditioning and as a supplement to armed combat. Soldiers in China were trained in unarmed combat as early as the Zhou dynasty (1022 BCE to 256 BCE).

Despite major technological changes such as the use of gunpowder, the machine gun in the Russo-Japanese War and the trench warfare of World War I, hand-to-hand fighting methods with the knife and bayonet remain common in modern military training, though the importance of formal training declined after 1918. By 1944 some German rifles were being produced without bayonet lugs.

=== Modern hand-to-hand combat techniques ===
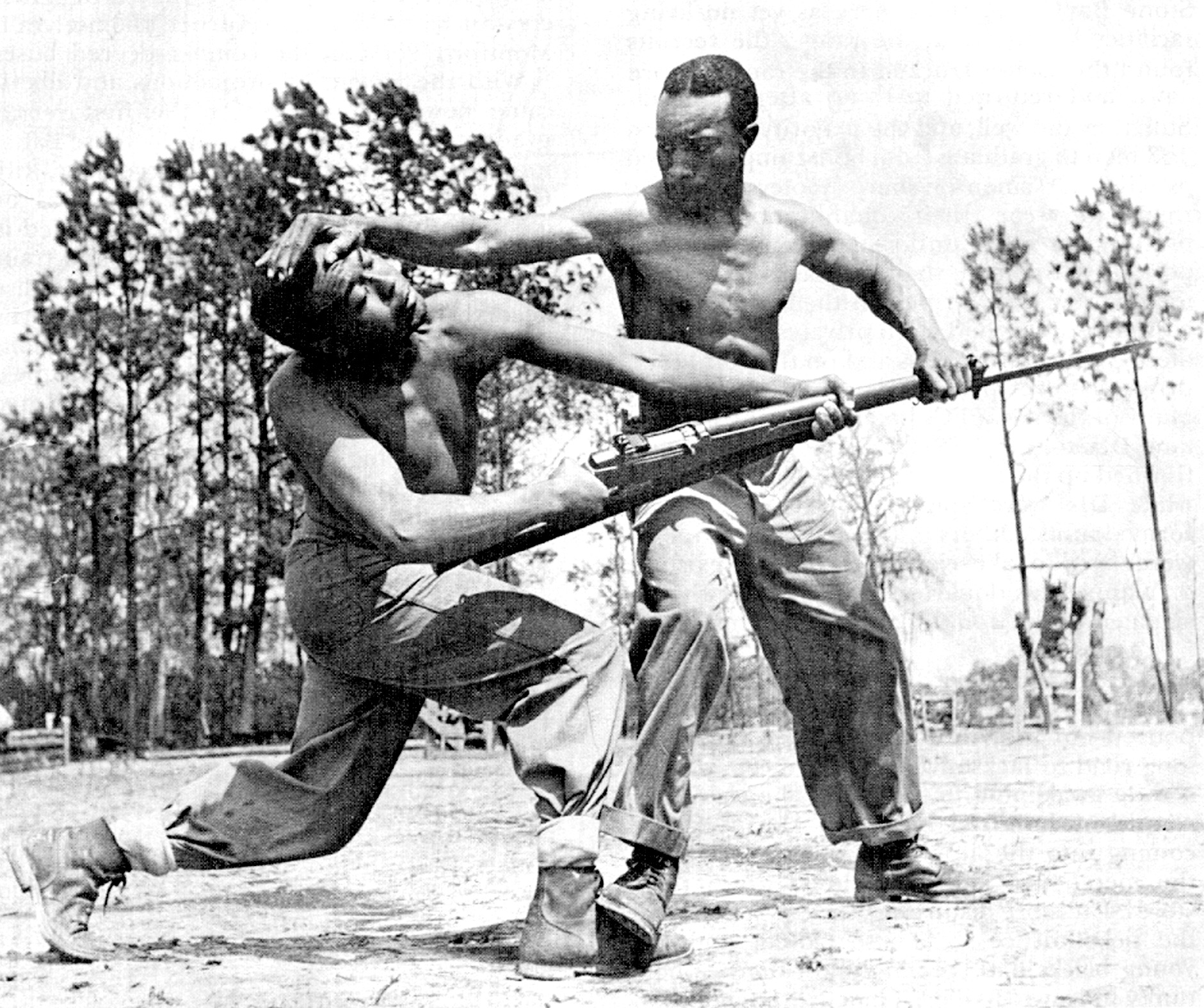
Corporal Alvin "Tony" Ghazlo, the senior bayonet and unarmed combat instructor at Montford Point, demonstrates a disarming technique on his assistant, Private Ernest "Judo" Jones.

Close-quarters combat (CQC), or World War II combatives, was largely codified by William Ewart Fairbairn and Eric Anthony Sykes. Also known for their eponymous Fairbairn–Sykes fighting knife, Fairbairn and Sykes had worked in the Shanghai Municipal Police of the International Settlement (1854–1943) of Shanghai in the 1920s, widely acknowledged as the most dangerous port city in the world due to a heavy opium trade run by organized crime (the Chinese Triads). CQC was derived from a mixture of judo, jujutsu, boxing, savate, wrestling and street fighting.

After the May Thirtieth Movement, Fairbairn was charged with developing an auxiliary squad for riot control. After absorbing the most appropriate elements from a variety of martial arts experts, from China, Japan and elsewhere, he condensed these arts into a practical combat system he called Defendu. He and his police team went on to field test these skills on the streets of Shanghai; Fairbairn himself used his combat system effectively in over 2,000 documented encounters, including over 600 lethal-force engagements. The aim of his combat system was simply to be as brutally effective as possible. It was also a system that, unlike traditional Eastern martial-arts that required years of intensive training, could be digested by recruits relatively quickly. The method incorporated training in point shooting and gun combat techniques, as well as the effective use of more ad hoc weapons such as chairs or table legs.

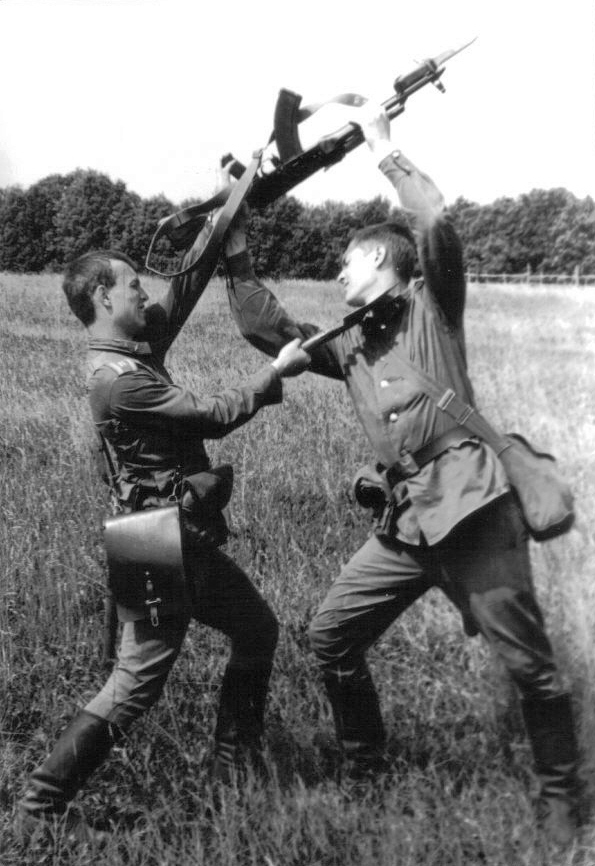
Hand-to-hand combat training in the Soviet Army, 1976

During the Second World War, Fairbairn was brought back to Britain, and, after demonstrating the effectiveness of his techniques, was recruited to train the British Commandos in his combat method. During this period, he expanded his 'Shanghai Method' into the 'Silent Killing Close Quarters Combat method' for military application. This became standard combat training for all British Special Operations personnel. He also designed the pioneering Fairbairn–Sykes fighting knife, which was adopted for use by British and American Special Forces. In 1942, he published a textbook for close quarters combat training called Get Tough.

U.S. Army officers Rex Applegate and Anthony Biddle were taught Fairbairn's methods at a training facility in Scotland, and adopted the program for the training of OSS operatives at a newly opened camp near Lake Ontario in Canada. Applegate published his work in 1943, called Kill or Get Killed. During the war, training was provided to British Commandos, the Devil's Brigade, OSS, U.S. Army Rangers and Marine Raiders.

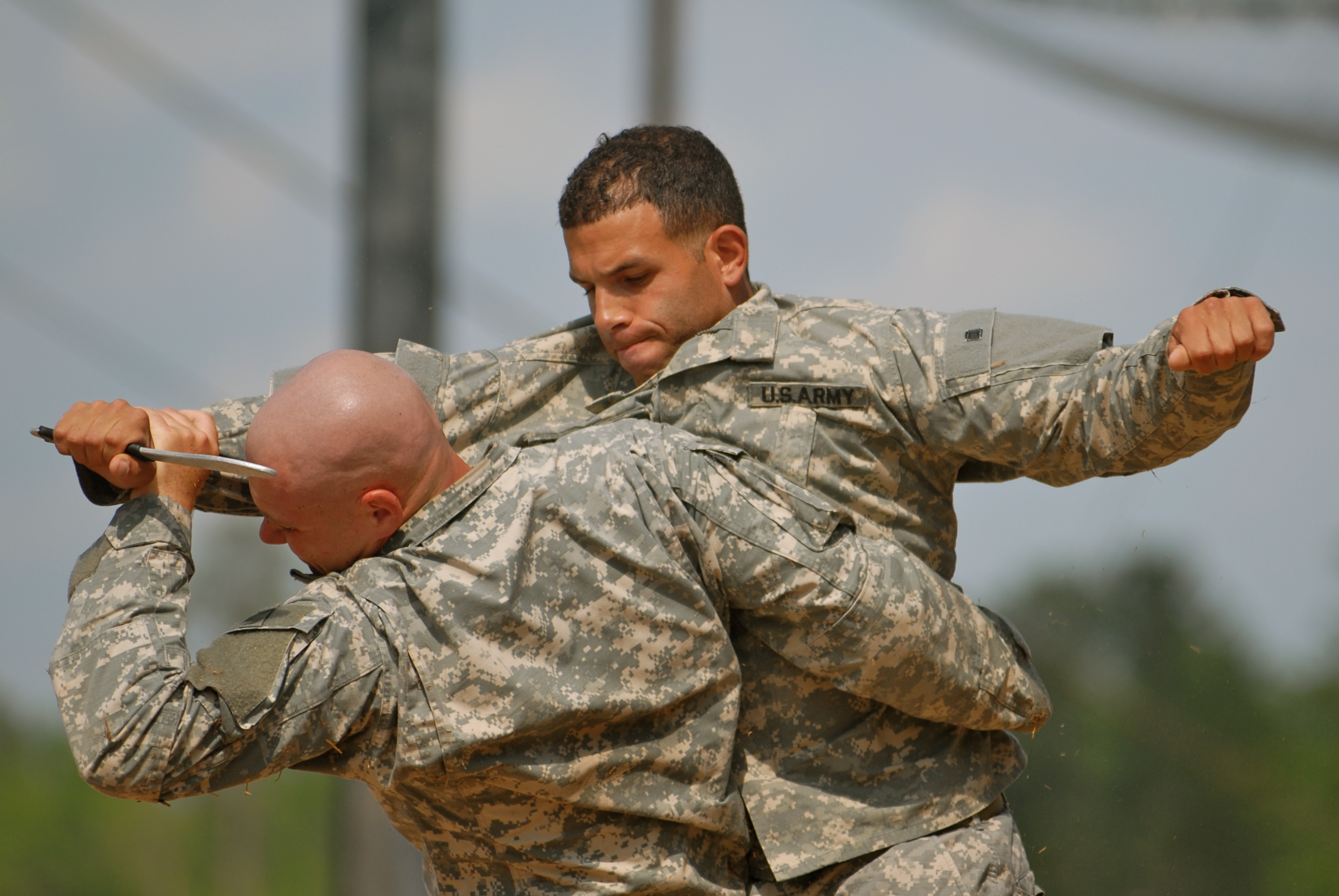
Rangers in Action 10-African Land Forces Summit, US Army Africa, 2010

Other combat systems designed for military combat were introduced elsewhere, including European Unifight, Soviet/Russian Sambo, Army hand-to-hand fight, Chinese military Sanshou/Sanda, Israeli Kapap and Krav Maga. The prevalence and style of hand-to-hand combat training often changes based on perceived need. Elite units such as special forces and commando units tend to place higher emphasis on hand-to-hand combat training.

Although hand-to-hand fighting was accorded less importance in major militaries after World War II, insurgency conflicts such as the Vietnam War, low intensity conflict and urban warfare have prompted many armies to pay more attention to this form of combat. When such fighting includes firearms designed for close-in fighting, it is often referred to as Close Quarters Battle (CQB) at the platoon or squad level, or Military Operations on Urban Terrain (MOUT) at higher tactical levels. A 2023 study using data from the Iraq and Afghanistan wars found that the majority of hand-to-hand combat involved grappling techniques instead of striking.

=== Sport ===
Hand-to-hand combat is a significant feature of most combat sports.

== Modern usage ==
A 2014 study found that, amongst US soldiers deployed to Iraq and Afghanistan between 2004 and 2008, 19% reported the use of hand-to-hand techniques in at least one encounter, in a variety of circumstances and contexts (such as close combat, prisoner handling, crowd control and security checkpoints), supporting prior research that indicated that, despite advances in technology, hand-to-hand combat remained a persistent aspect of modern warfare.

Hand-to-hand combat is the principal form of combat during skirmishes between Indian Army and Chinese People's Liberation Army soldiers along the disputed Himalayan border between India and the People's Republic of China. While Chinese and Indian soldiers carry firearms, due to decades of tradition designed to reduce the possibility of an escalation, agreements disallow usage of firearms along this border. In the 2020 China–India skirmishes, hand-to-hand combat involving stones, batons, iron rods, and other makeshift weapons resulted in the deaths of over 50 soldiers on both sides over six hours of fighting.

=== Military systems ===
- In the Soviet Union, sambo (self-defence without weapons) began development in the 1920s for the military and secret police as a fighting system based on indigenous and foreign martial arts. It has since become a combat sport, an international style of wrestling, and foundation for many MMA fighters.
  - ARB (Army Hand-to-Hand Combat) is a Soviet martial art based on sambo that began development for the military in 1979. It has since become a popular combat sport in Russia.
- Krav Maga is an Israeli martial art that was used by Zionist paramilitary groups and subsequently adopted by the Israeli military when it was founded in 1948.
- Jieitaikakutōjutsu is a military self-defence and fighting system developed for JSDF personnel. The system primarily consists of hand-to-hand combat, bayonet and knife fighting principles.
- In 2002, the U.S. Army adopted the Modern Army Combatives (MAC) hand-to-hand combat training program with the publishing of U.S. Army field manual (FM 3-25.150) and the establishment of the U.S. Army Combatives School at Ft Benning, Georgia.
  - The U.S. Air Force adopted MAC as its hand-to-hand combat system in early 2008.
- In the U.S. Marine Corps, Marine Corps Martial Arts Program (MCMAP) replaced the Marine Corps LINE combat system in 2002. Each Marine keeps a record book that records their training, and a colored belt system (tan, gray, green, brown, and black in order of precedence) is used to denote experience and skill level, similar to many Asian martial arts.

== Federation ==
The International Federation for Hand-to-Hand-Fighting (HSIF) was founded in 2006 in Moscow.

== See also ==
- Boxing (disambiguation)
- Knife fight
