= Lorica =

Lorica (Latin pronunciation: [loːˈriːka]), a Latin word literally meaning "body armour", may refer to:

== Ancient Roman military clothing ==
- Lorica hamata, a hauberk of mail
- Lorica manica, a type of iron or bronze arm guard
- Lorica musculata, the Latin name for a muscle cuirass
- Lorica plumata, a shirt of ribbed scales resembling feathers
- Lorica segmentata, a cuirass of metal plates
- Lorica squamata, a shirt of metal scales

== Biology ==
- Lorica (biology), a protective outer covering secreted by loriciferans and some protozoans
- Lorica (chiton), a genus of chiton
- Ranoidea lorica, a species of frog

== Locations ==
- Loriga, a freguesia and town in Seia, Portugal, originally named Lorica by the ancient Romans
- Santa Cruz de Lorica, a municipality and town in the Córdoba Department, Colombia

== Other uses ==
- Lorica (prayer), a protective prayer in the Irish Christian monasticism
- Leiden Riddle, a riddle by Aldhelm
