= SPEAR System =

Personal self-defense system

- Also known as: Spontaneous Protection Enabling Accelerated Response
- Focus: Hybrid
- Country of origin: Canada
- Creator: Tony Blauer
- Olympic sport: No
- Official website: http://blauerspear.com

The SPEAR System (an acronym for Spontaneous Protection Enabling Accelerated Response) is a close-quarter protection system that uses a person's reflex action in threatening situations as a basis for defence. The founder, Tony Blauer, developed the SPEAR System in Canada during the 1980s.

== History ==
The SPEAR System's origin began in 1982 with the developed "Panic Attack" drill that attempts to mirror the physiological response of a sudden ambush.

The "Panic Attack" study developed into the "Be Your Own Bodyguard" program and the present day SPEAR and Personal Defense Readiness ("PDR") programs.

In 2007 UK's Association of Chief Police Officers approved SPEAR for inclusion in the Personal Safety Training Manual for the British police.

The Scottish Prison Service uses a modified version of SPEAR in its Personal Protective Techniques.

In 2010 an English Mental Health NHS Trust piloted the first ever SPEAR training programme for staff working with mentally disordered offenders.

== See also ==
- List of martial arts
- Krav Maga
- Combatives
- Self-defense
- S.C.A.R.S. (military)
