= United States Army Combatives School =

Martial arts school

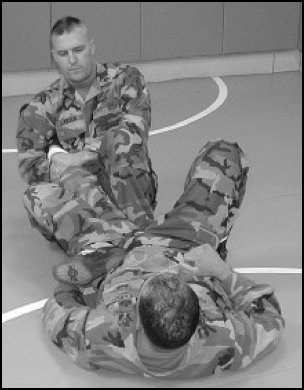
Matt Larsen demonstrating a straight ankle lock

The US Army Combatives School was founded in 2000 by then Sergeant First Class Matt Larsen and is located at building 69, Fort Benning, Georgia. It teaches a martial art unique to the United States Army called Modern Army Combatives (MAC).

== History ==
After years of developing the elite 75th Ranger Regiment's hand to hand program, Larsen was assigned to the Ranger Training Brigade, the combatives proponent at the time, to rewrite the Field Manual FM 21-150. Upon finishing this, it was published in 2002 as FM 3-25.150 (Combatives), he was asked by the 11th Infantry Regiment (a TRADOC unit) to develop a training course for their cadre. Advocacy for the combatives doctrine was transferred to the 11th Infantry Regiment to follow SFC Larsen. An old, disused warehouse in Fort Benning, Georgia became the site of the school. Soon, units from around the Army were sending Soldiers to this course. Over the next several years the program was developed around the idea of building virtually self-sustaining combatives programs within units by training cadres of instructors indigenous to each unit. With the continued success of this approach, the school became the recognized source of instruction for the entire US Army.

== Training ==
Larsen recognized in the development of the Modern Army Combatives Program that previous programs had suffered from the same problems. Invariably, the approach had been to pick a small set of what were deemed simple, effective, easy to learn techniques and train them in whatever finite amount of time was granted on a training calendar. This “terminal training” approach, which offered no follow-on training plan other than continued practice of the same limited number of techniques, had failed in the past because it did not provide an avenue or the motivation for continued training.

Instead, his approach was to use the limited amount of institutional training time to lay a foundation for ever more realistic training around the Army. Basic techniques were selected not simply because they were simple and effective, but also because they were representative of classes of techniques. These basic techniques were put together in a series of simple drills so that through repetition, such as during daily physical training or as a warm-up exercise, Soldiers could be expected to not only memorize but master the basic techniques.

=== Drills ===
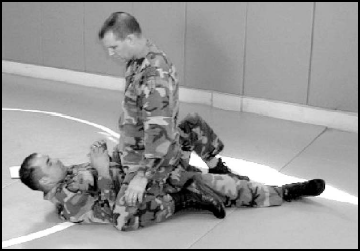
Matt Larsen demonstrating the mount

Drills were designed to rapidly teach core concepts to students. The first and most widely taught drill is known as Drill One and is as follows:

- Student A starts in the mount on student B
- B escapes from the mount by trapping one of A's arms and rolling him to his back
- A holds B in his guard
- B passes A's guard to side control
- B achieves the mount
- B is now in the same position that A was in the beginning of the drill
- The drill is repeated, with the roles reversed

Such drills serve many pedagogical functions. They instill basic movement patterns and so internalize the concept of a hierarchy of dominant positions. When used as a part of a warm-up they maximize the use of available training time, allowing instructors to review the details of the basic techniques without taking time away from more advanced training. New techniques can be taught in context, for example a new choke can be practiced every time the appropriate position is reached. They allow students of different levels to work together. An advanced student will not necessarily pass the guard or achieve the mount in the same way as a beginner but the drill still functions as a framework for practice. The drills also allow combatives training to become a routine part of every Soldiers day. During physical training for instance Soldiers could be asked to perform the drills interchangeable with callisthenic exercises.

=== Submission techniques ===
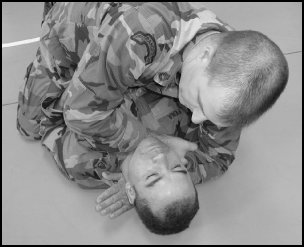
A sleeve choke executed from the mount

Since submission techniques can often directly end a fight or cause an immediate benefit for the soldier that successfully applies them, they are very much preferred over striking. Critics argue that focusing on submission techniques could be hazardous for soldiers in combat zones (as opposed to controlled tournament-type fights), as it temporarily prevents forward motion and increases vulnerability to multiple attackers.

The most beneficial category of submission technique is the chokehold. Students are taught a variety of different chokes and are taught how a properly applied choke feels so that they know the difference between a choke that they must break or submit to immediately and one that they can safely ignore if they have an opening for a submission hold of their own. A properly applied blood choke will prevent the flow of blood to and from the brain, resulting in unconsciousness in approximately 4–10 seconds. The best known example of this is the rear naked choke.

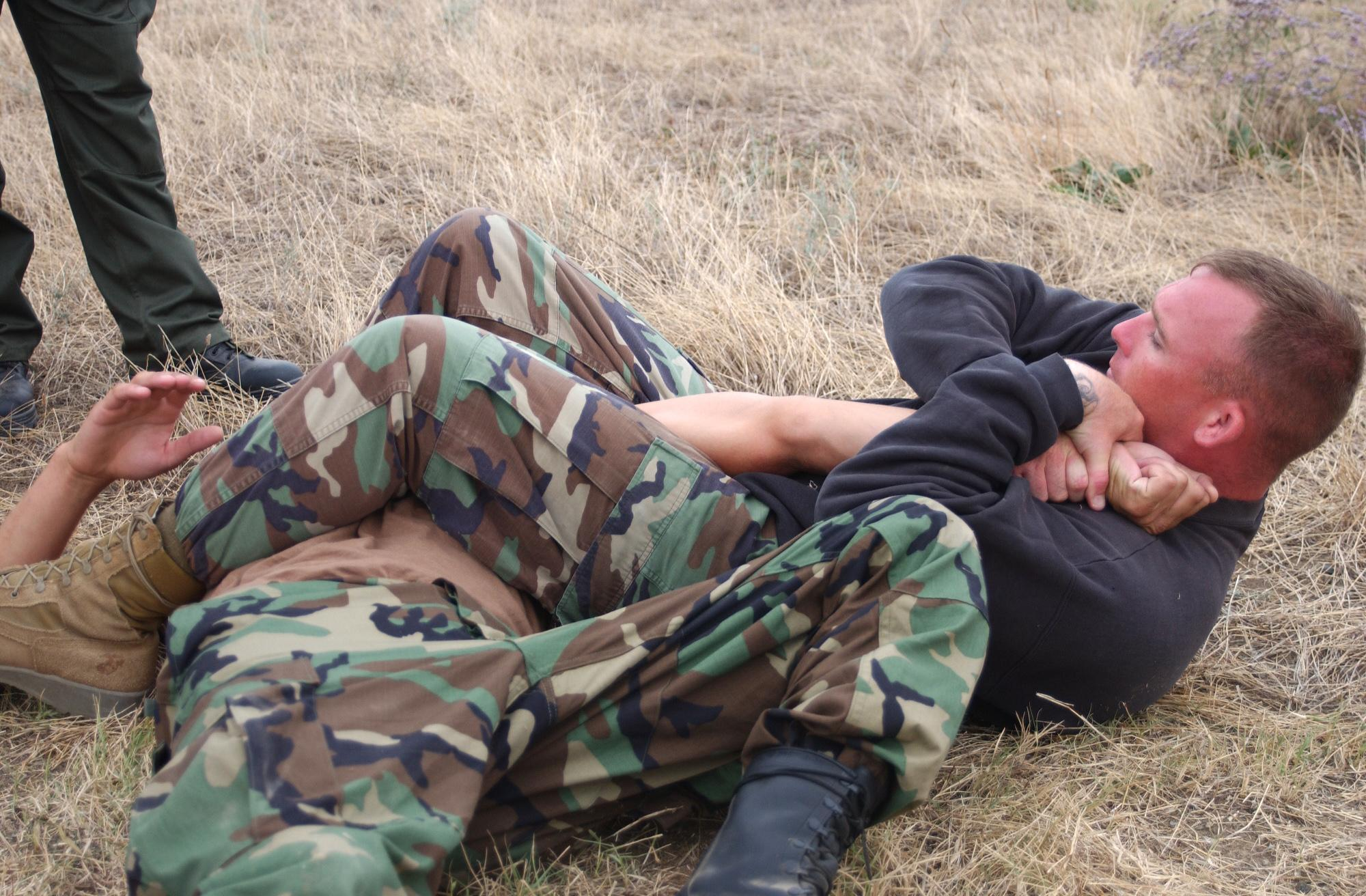
The straight armbar, also known as juji-gatame

Less preferred, but also effective techniques are joint locks. Joint locks are not the preferred method for attacking an enemy, because they do not completely disable the enemy. Joints locks do inflict large amounts of pain and can secure compliance from the enemy. This makes them especially useful in controlling opponents during crowd control operations or when someone is being clearly threatening, but the rules of engagement prohibit killing them. If compliance cannot be secured or is not desired, the joint lock can be extended fully, breaking the applicable joint. Students are taught the difference between pain that signals a joint lock is in progress and simple discomfort. The most common joint lock in combatives is the straight armbar.

While small joint locks and spinal locks are applicable, they are generally not taught in the combatives courses. Small joint locks are not proven methods of ending fights, nor are they especially disabling. While spinal locks can completely disable or kill an enemy, practicing these methods are not safe and thus are not taught.

== Competitions ==
One of the fundamental aspects of Modern Army Combatives training is the use of competitions as a tool to motivate Soldiers to train. Realizing the inherent problem with competitive systems, that competitors will focus their training on winning and therefore only train the techniques that are allowed in competition, Larsen designed a system of graduated rules. More liberal rules are used for higher level of competitions.

There are four levels of competition;

- Basic: For competition for new soldiers, such as basic trainees or for squad and platoon level, competitors start grappling from their knees and no leg locks are allowed.
- Standard: For company level competition and for preliminary bouts in any tournament above company level, competitors begin from their feet. Straight leg and foot locks are allowed, and points are awarded in a scoring system based the way takedowns are scored in collegiate wrestling and positional dominance in ground grappling from Brazilian jiu-jitsu.
- Intermediate: For the finals at battalion and brigade level and semi-finals at division and above, Intermediate rules allow limited striking. Open hand strikes are allowed to the head and closed fist strikes to the body. Kicks are allowed to any target except the groin while standing and knee strikes are allowed to the body while standing and to the legs while on the ground. The fight consists of one ten minute round.
- Advanced: For finals at division level and above, the advanced rules are essentially those of mixed martial arts.

== See also ==
- List of martial arts
- LINE (combat system)
- Marine Corps Martial Arts Program
- SPEAR System
- Special Combat Aggressive Reactionary System
- Taijutsu
