= ARB (martial art) =

Soviet martial art

Armeyskiy Rukopashniy Boy (ARB)
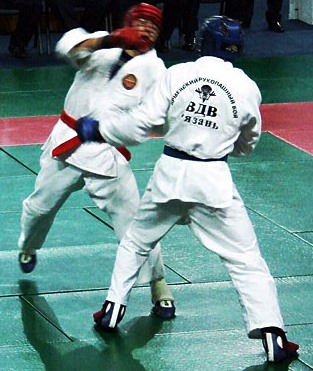
- Also known as: Army Hand-to-Hand Combat
- Focus: Striking, Grappling
- Hardness: full contact
- Country of origin: Soviet Union
- Creator: Soviet Armed Forces (Soviet Union); Soviet Airborne Troops
- Parenthood: Sport Sambo, Wrestling, Judo, Boxing, Kickboxing, Catch Wrestling

ARB (Russian: Армейский Рукопашный Бой; Armeyskiy Rukopashniy Boy; 'Army Hand-to-Hand Combat') is a Soviet martial art which was developed for the military in the late 1970s and tested with the Soviet Airborne Troops, utilising both striking and grappling techniques with an emphasis on stand-up fighting and use of throws to take an opponent down quickly. It incorporated many functional elements from an arsenal of army-style hand-to-hand combat and martial arts styles from around the world, and has been intended for use in a combat environment. It is a relatively modern and quickly developing style of martial arts, and, as a combat sport, it has become popular for its full-contact sparring while offering a relatively modest risk of injury. Contrary to Combat Sambo contests, which are being held at a standard wrestling mat, ARB contests require a 10×10 m (33×33 ft) tatami-like squared area.

== History ==
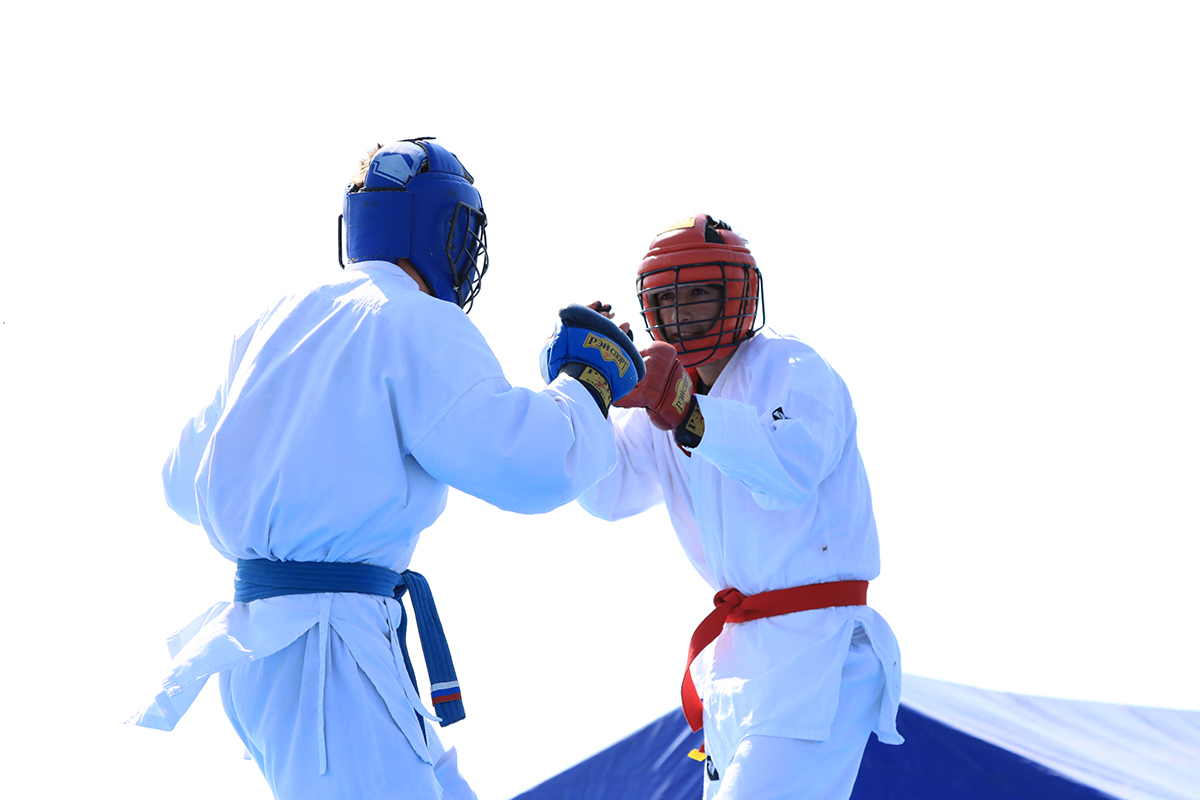
Competitions in army hand-to-hand combat at the international competition «Excellent students of military intelligence». September 3, 2020

ARB's origin as a military-applied martial art dates back to 1979 when the city of Kaunas (the settlement Gaižiūnai, military unit no. 42235) held the first championship for Airborne troops on the sports base of the 7th Guards Airborne Division. Since then, the Airborne troops' ARB championships have been held annually. ARB was created by experts and enthusiasts of physical preparation and was played as a sport of the Soviet Army. It was also successfully introduced into the Soviet army to train soldiers.

Carrying out of the first championship on ARB would not have been possible without long-term practice and experiments with various kinds of single combat. Black belt-rated sportsmen and prize-winners of competitions in sambo, boxing, wrestling, judo and other fighting sports were carefully selected to participate in a game of ARB. Methodical work of fighters and commanders, has also impulsed to the origin of the martial art which is nowadays widely known under the name "Army Hand-to-Hand Combat". At that point in time (the beginning of the 1970s) actual training of regular soldiers for hand-to-hand combat was named as "the Program of preparation of instructors in sports and special receptions of a landing".

== Rules ==
A distinctive part of ARB that sets it apart from other full contact single combat martial arts is the possibility of finishing with the opponent on hands and feet from a standing position. The opponent may call "Stop", as some kicks on the head of the opponent may not be protected by a helmet, and can lead to heavy damages that interrupt the match immediately. Blows of the opponent by a foot in a head is a knock-down to the fighter who has performed such a blow.

=== General rules ===
- Fights are played on a square carpet that is no smaller than 14×14 meters. Fights occur on the square with the border of the fight zone at 8×8 m or 10×10 m. The "external zone" of the carpet serves for the safety of sportsmen and is no less than 3 meters in size. On a knockout of a fighter the carpet fight stops and a command "Stop" is issued. The judge will then issue a "Fighters to the middle" command, which directs sportsmen to go to the center (middle) of the carpet. Thus, if a knockout of one or more fighters has happened on the carpet (including on the safety zone), and the combat's termination has occurred outside of the fighting square, such reception is estimated, and the combat stops by the general rules.
- Fighters break on age (concerning fighters till 18 years and division into age categories depends on Position about competitions) and weight categories beginning from weight to 60 kg and to weight over 90 kg with step of 5 kg. Sometimes, under the preliminary coordination, can be only two weight categories—to 75 kg and over 75 kg (only at adults on local tournaments).
- Fighters are divided into the fighter with a red and dark blue belt, and in certain cases—the fighter in black or white gi. The fighter whose surname is specified the first in the summary table—dresses a red belt (black kimono).
- the Fighter needs a second who is responsible for ammunition of the sportsman during a duel ("to tie up a helmet, to fix overlays, a protector, to tie up a belt kimono and another") as fighter not in condition independently to solve these problems in taken away on the amendment of ammunition time. During a duel the second settles down on a chair behind a place of the fighter. Thus during a duel it is forbidden to second to give to the fighter any commands or councils. For conversations with the second to the fighter the remark can be made, and at repeated infringement—prevention.
- At competitions the following equipment is used: a kimono, foot protection of a heel and lifting of foot, an overlay on the shins, a cup on the groin, a protective waistcoat (protector), gloves, knee protection, forearm and elbow protection, a helmet with a metal lattice ". The protective regimentals (except gloves and a helmet) put on under the kimono.
- Fight consists of one round and lasts: at teenagers, young men and juniors—2 minutes of pure time, at men (and all final fights)—3 minutes of pure time. At girls and women duration of duels can decrease at pre-tournament meeting of representatives of commands.
- such technical actions, as Are estimated: blows by hands, blows by feet, throws and painful receptions. Blows and struggle in "orchestra" it is not estimated, but it is privately considered at equality of points (as activity in Sambo-wrestling).
- forbidden tricks concern: drawing of blows by fingers in eyes; carrying out of suffocating captures and painful receptions on a neck, backbone, a brush, foot; jumps feet and stamping blows on the lying contender; blows in a groin, a neck, on joints of feet and hands, a nape and a backbone; painful receptions in a rack; capture for a helmet or a helmet lattice.
- the victory is awarded:
  - on points "(the decision of judges)";
  - behind a clear advantage "(when the opponent ceases to resist to attack or during attack has turned to the opponent a back)";
  - in connection with refusal of the opponent to continue a duel "(reception of the trauma which have been not connected with infringement corrected the opponent, weariness and so forth)";
  - absence of the opponent on a duel;
  - delivery of the opponent as a result of carrying out of painful reception;
  - at two knock-downs of one fighter during one duel "(to avoid an unjustified traumatism)";
  - at disqualification of the opponent "(three preventions, unsportsmanlike behaviour in exceptional cases, drawing to the opponent of foul blows after which that can't continue a duel [i.e., strikes to the groin])".

== See also ==
- Hand-to-hand combat
- Combat Sambo
