= Marine Corps Martial Arts Program =

US military combat system training

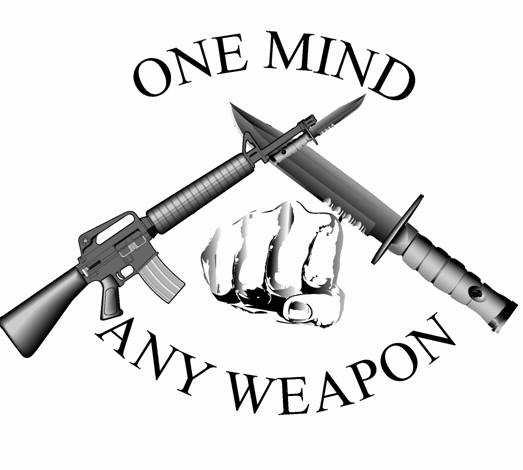
- MCMAP logo
- Focus: Hybrid
- Country of origin: United States
- Creator: United States Marine Corps
- Parenthood: Real life-based combat gun training and weapon training

The Marine Corps Martial Arts Program (MCMAP, /ˈmɪkmæp/) is a combat system developed by the United States Marine Corps to combine existing and new hand-to-hand and close quarters combat techniques with morale and team-building functions and instruction in the warrior ethos. The program, which began in 2001, trains Marines (and U.S. Navy personnel attached to Marine units) in unarmed combat, edged weapons, weapons of opportunity, and rifle and bayonet techniques.

It also stresses mental and character development, including the responsible use of force, leadership, and teamwork.

The MCMAP is also known by the nickname Semper Fu, a wordplay on Semper Fi—a shortened version of the motto of the USMC, Semper Fidelis—and kung fu, one of the martial arts disciplines which the program is based on.

== History ==
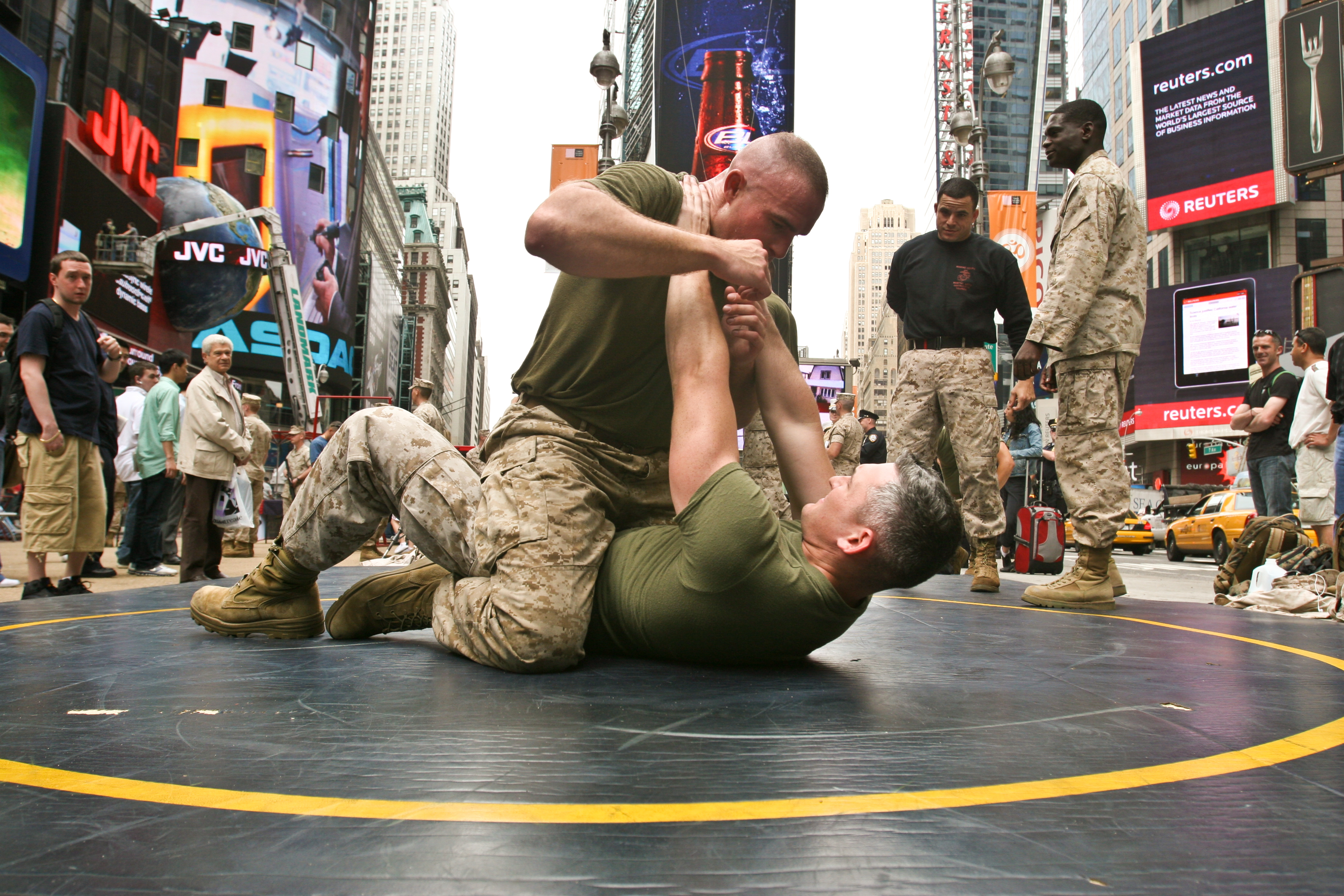
Marines demonstrate MCMAP in Times Square for Fleet Week 2010

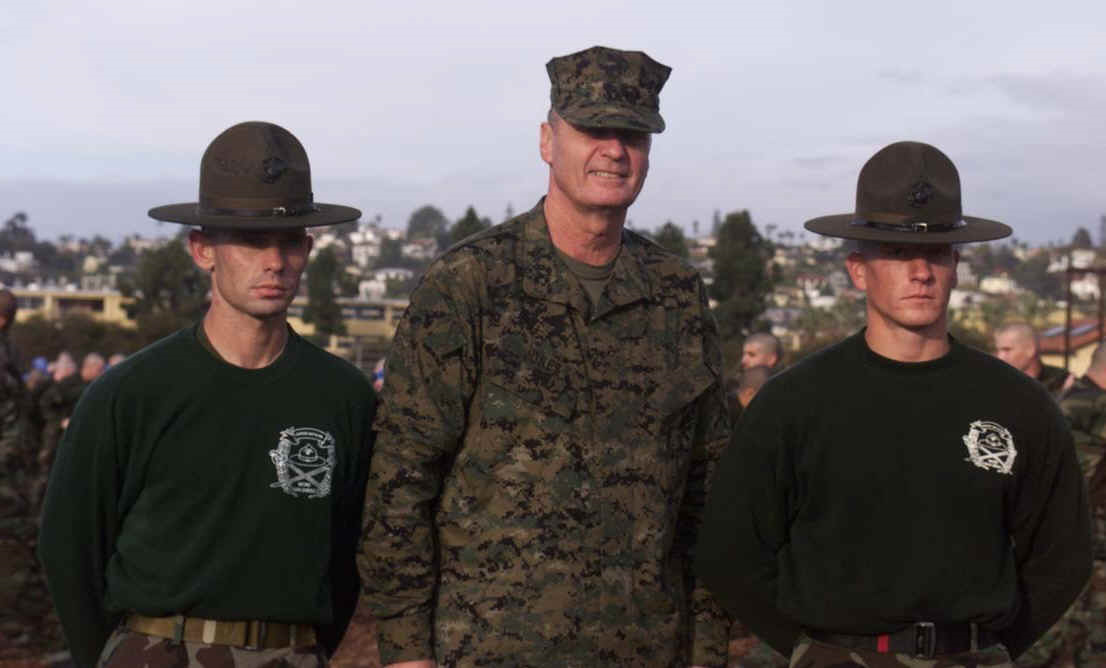
2 MCMAP instructors with General James L. Jones in January 2002 at MCRD San Diego

The MCMAP was officially created by Marine Corps Order 1500.54, published in 2002, as a "revolutionary step in the development of martial arts skills for Marines and replaces all other close-combat related systems preceding its introduction." MCMAP comes from an evolution dating back to the creation of the Marine Corps, beginning with the martial abilities of Marine boarding parties, who often had to rely on bayonet and cutlass techniques. During World War I these bayonet techniques were supplemented with unarmed combat techniques, which often proved useful in trench warfare. Between the world wars, Colonel Anthony J. Biddle began the creation of standardized bayonet and close combat techniques based on boxing, wrestling, savate and fencing. Also during this period, Captains Wallace M. Greene and Samuel B. Griffith learned Kung Fu techniques from Chinese American Marines and brought this knowledge to other Marines throughout the Marine Corps.

In 1956, at Marine Corps Recruit Depot (MCRD) San Diego, Lieutenant Colonel Ralph Hayward (captain of the Judo team at MCRD) made Gunnery Sergeant Bill Miller the new Non-Commissioned Officer in Charge of hand-to-hand combat. Miller was ordered to develop a new curriculum that any Marine could use to quickly kill the enemy. Miller created the program from various martial arts such as Okinawan karate, judo, taekwondo, boxing, and jujutsu. Every Marine recruit that went through MCRD was instructed in Miller's combat curriculum. This also included special operations forces from all branches of the military and civilian entities. Later in 2001, retired Gunnery Sergeant Bill Miller was awarded the Black Belt Emeritus "for pioneering Martial Arts in the United States Marine Corps."

Eventually these different techniques evolved into the LINE System in the early 1980s. Later, the system was found to be lacking in flexibility and techniques for use in situations that did not require lethal force, such as peacekeeping operations. The Marine Corps began searching for a more effective system. The result was the Marine Corps close combat training program implemented in 1997–1999. MCMAP was implemented as part of a Commandant of the Marine Corps initiative in summer 2000. Commandant James L. Jones assigned Lieutenant Colonel George Bristol and Master Gunnery Sergeant Cardo Urso, with almost 70 years of martial arts experience between them, to establish the new MCMAP curriculum.

== Structure and belt system ==
MCMAP Belts

The program uses an advancement system of colored belts similar to that of most martial arts. The different levels of belts are:

- Tan belt, the lowest color belt and conducted during entry-level training, signifies the basic understanding of the mental, physical, and character disciplines. It is the minimum requirement of all Marines with a training time of 27.5 hours and has no prerequisites. Recruits receive these belts after completion of a practical application test on all of the basic techniques of the Tan Belt.
- Gray belt is the second belt attained after 25 hours of training. It signifies an intermediate understanding of the basic disciplines.
- Green belt is the third belt, requiring 25 hours of training. This belt signifies understanding of the intermediate fundamentals of the different disciplines. This is the first belt level in which one can become an instructor, which allows him or her to teach tan, grey, and green belt techniques with the power to award the appropriate belt. The prerequisites for this belt include a recommendation from reporting senior.
- Brown belt is the fourth belt level requiring 33 hours of training. It introduces Marines to the advanced fundamentals of each discipline. In addition, as with green belts, they may be certified as instructors and teach tan through brown techniques. Prerequisites for this belt include recommendation of reporting senior.
- Black belt 1st degree is the highest belt color and requires 40 hours of supervised training. It signifies knowledge of the advanced fundamentals of the different disciplines. A 1st degree black belt instructor may teach fundamentals from tan to black belt and award the appropriate belt. In addition, a black belt can become an instructor-trainer, which authorizes them to teach and award all belts, as well as teach and certify instructors. Prerequisites include recommendation of reporting senior.

There are an additional five degrees of black belt, with several of the same common prerequisites, including recommendation of reporting senior, appropriate level of professional military education completed, and current instructor status. Black belt 2nd degree to 6th degree signify that the holder is an authority in the Marine Corps Martial Arts Program. In addition to the above prerequisite, each belt also has its own rank requirements.

Because the belts are worn with the Marine Corps Combat Utility Uniform, the complete range of belt colors such as red, yellow, or purple are excluded as a practical consideration. Once Marines obtain their green belt, they can attend an additional training course (such as those at the two Schools of Infantry) to become a martial arts instructor (secondary Military Occupational Specialty (MOS) 0916, formerly 8551).

MCMAP instructors can train and certify other Marines up to their current belt level. The instructor status is signified by one vertical tan stripe on the MCMAP belt. A Marine must have attended at least the Martial Arts Instructor (MAI) course to advance beyond first degree black belt. The only one who can train a Marine to be an instructor are black belt Martial Arts Instructor-Trainers (MAIT). An instructor-trainer's status is signified by a vertical red stripe on the MCMAP belt and a secondary MOS of 0917 (formerly 8552). To become a MAIT, a Marine must have already completed a local MAI course. The Marine then attends the MAIT course at the Martial Arts Center of Excellence located at Raider Hall at Marine Corps Base Quantico.

MCMAP techniques can be taught to other services and to foreign military members, and belts are awarded to those who complete the course.

== Disciplines ==
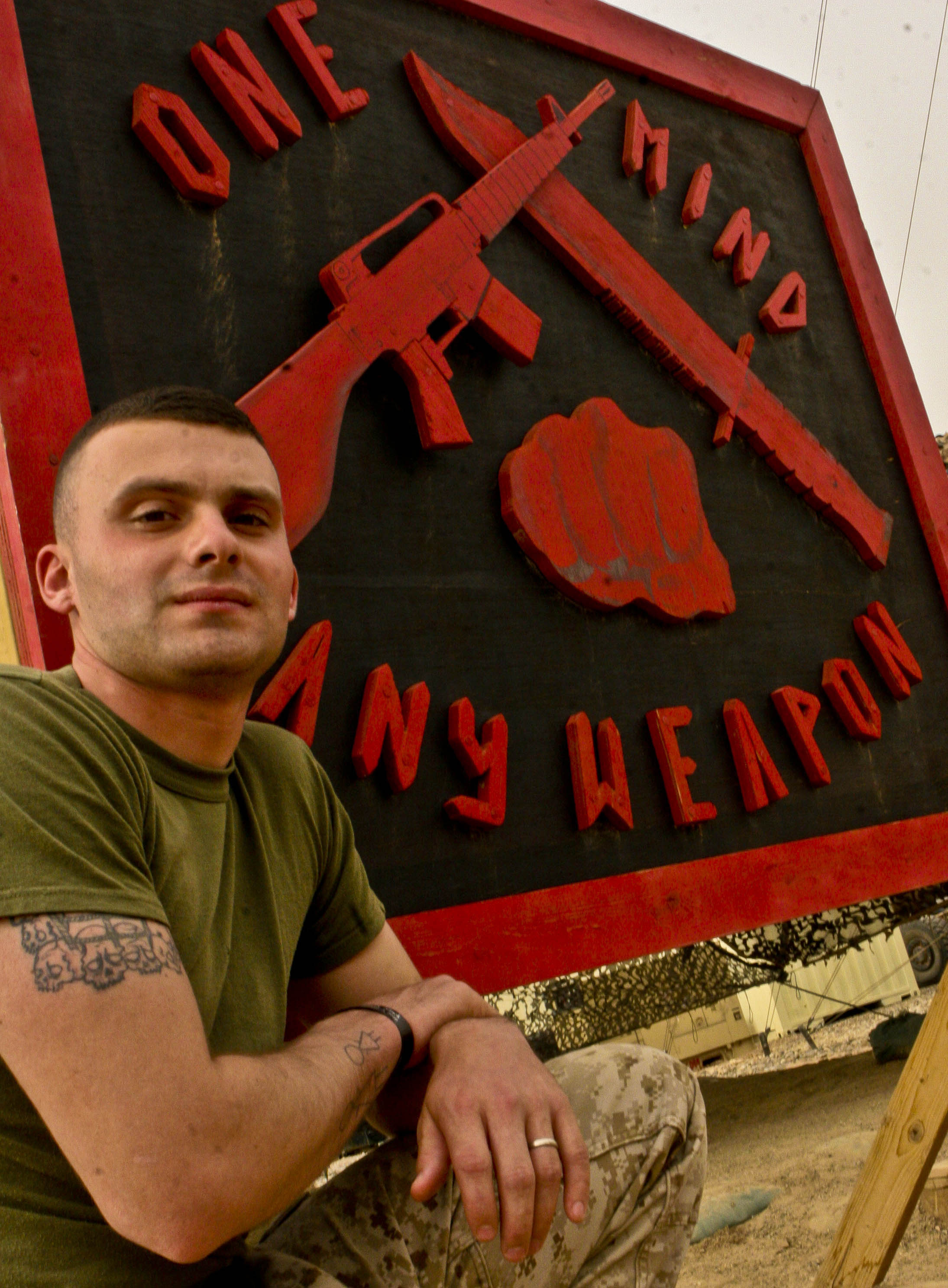
“One mind, any weapon.” The motto focuses on developing mental strength as well as physical

"MCMAP is a synergy of mental, character, and physical disciplines with application across the full spectrum of violence." The disciplines are the foundation of the MCMAP system, as it serves a dual purpose. MCMAP was implemented to increase the combat efficiency, as well as to increase the confidence and leadership abilities, of Marines. Marines are required to develop the mind, body and spirit simultaneously and equally. Safety is also of importance, so equipment such as mouthguards and pads are used in conjunction with techniques such as half-speed practice and break-falls to prevent injury.

The Commandant of the Marine Corps determined that the disciplines studied in MCMAP are integral to the function of Marines and had ordered that all Marines attain a tan belt qualification by the end of 2007. Additionally, all infantry Marines are required to attain a green belt qualification, and other combat arms must attain a gray belt.

=== Mental ===
Warrior Studies focus on individuals that have shown exemplary service on the battlefield, as well as discussion and analysis of combat citations. Martial culture studies focus on societies that produce warriors either primarily or exclusively. Some of the martial cultures that are studied are the Marine Raiders, Spartans, Zulu and Apache. By studying these cultures, Marines learn fundamental tactics and methods of the past and reconnect themselves with the warrior ethos of the Marine Corps. Combative behavior studies interpersonal violence, as well as rules of engagement and the force continuum (which dictates when and how much force can be used in response to the mission, up to and including lethal force). The development of this discipline also stresses situational awareness, tactical and strategic decision-making, and operational risk management.

=== Character ===
The purpose of this discipline is to create "ethical warriors." It involves discussion on Marine Corps core values, ethics, and good citizenship. An instructor can fail a Marine if he or she feels that the student does not adequately possess honor, courage, and commitment. Some belts also require the approval of the commanding officer before being awarded. The force continuum is discussed, allowing a Marine to responsibly use the minimum amount of force necessary, including lethal force. Leadership qualities are also stressed.

=== Physical ===
In MCMAP, only a third of the training involves techniques and physical development. The physical discipline includes the training of fighting techniques, strength, and endurance. This discipline also includes sustainment of skills and techniques already taught, in order to improve skill as well as develop weak-side proficiency. Ground fighting, grappling, pugil bouts, bayonet dummies, and other techniques are used to familiarize Marines with the application of the techniques used. In addition, physical strength and endurance are tested and improved with various techniques that often require teamwork or competition, such as calisthenics, running with full gear, log carries, and boxing matches. Techniques can also be practiced in water or in low-light conditions to simulate combat stress.

== Techniques ==
MCMAP draws influences from several disciplines including Brazilian jiu-jitsu, Wrestling, Judo, Capoeira, Sambo, Bujinkan Budo Taijutsu, boxing, Savate, kickboxing, Isshin-ryū Karate, Muay Thai, Taekwondo, Kung Fu, Aikido, Hapkido, Eskrima, Sayoc Kali, Jujutsu, Krav Maga, Iaido, Kendo, and Kobudo.

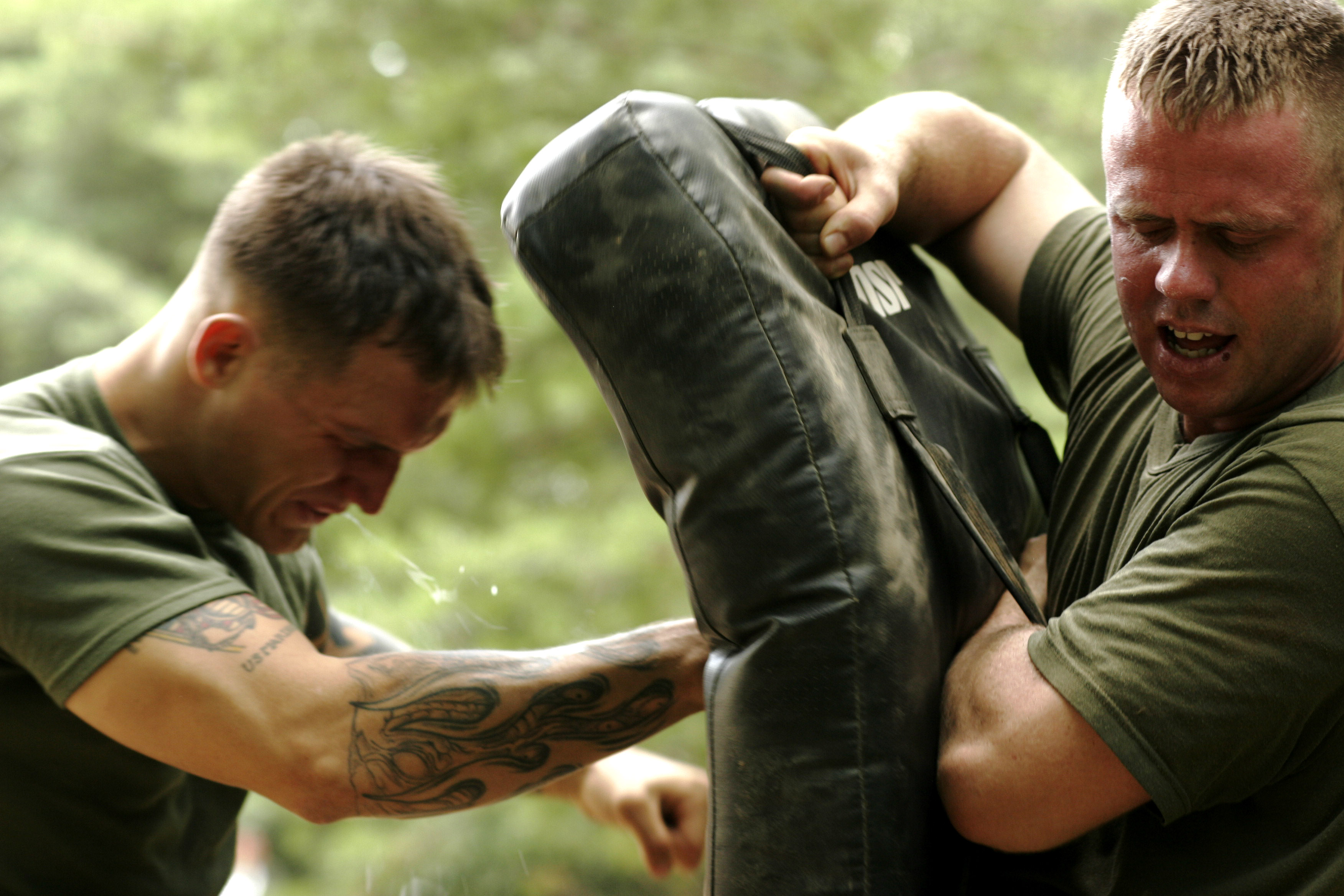
Marines practice MCMAP after being exposed to Pepper spray.

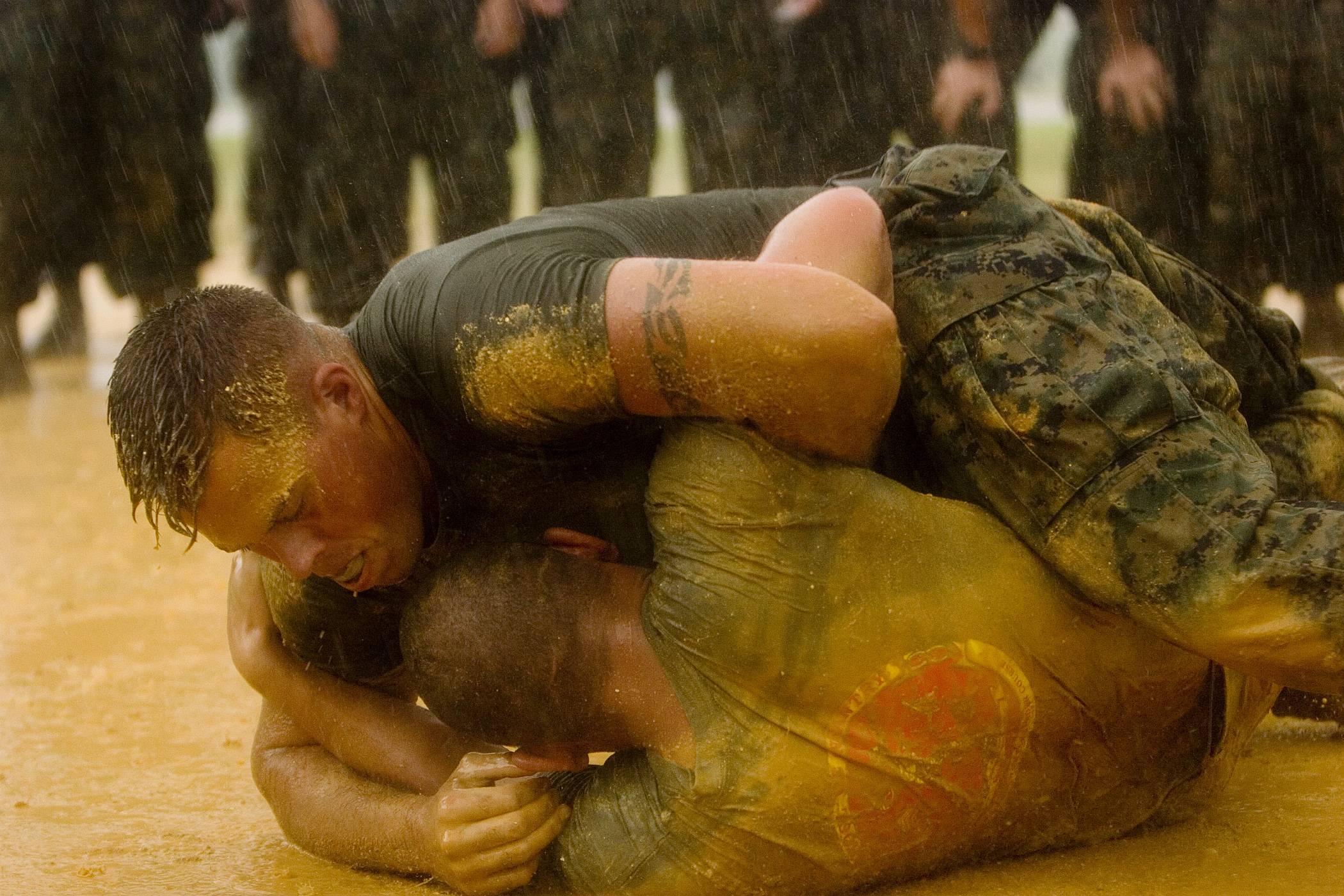
Marines practice ground fighting in the rain.

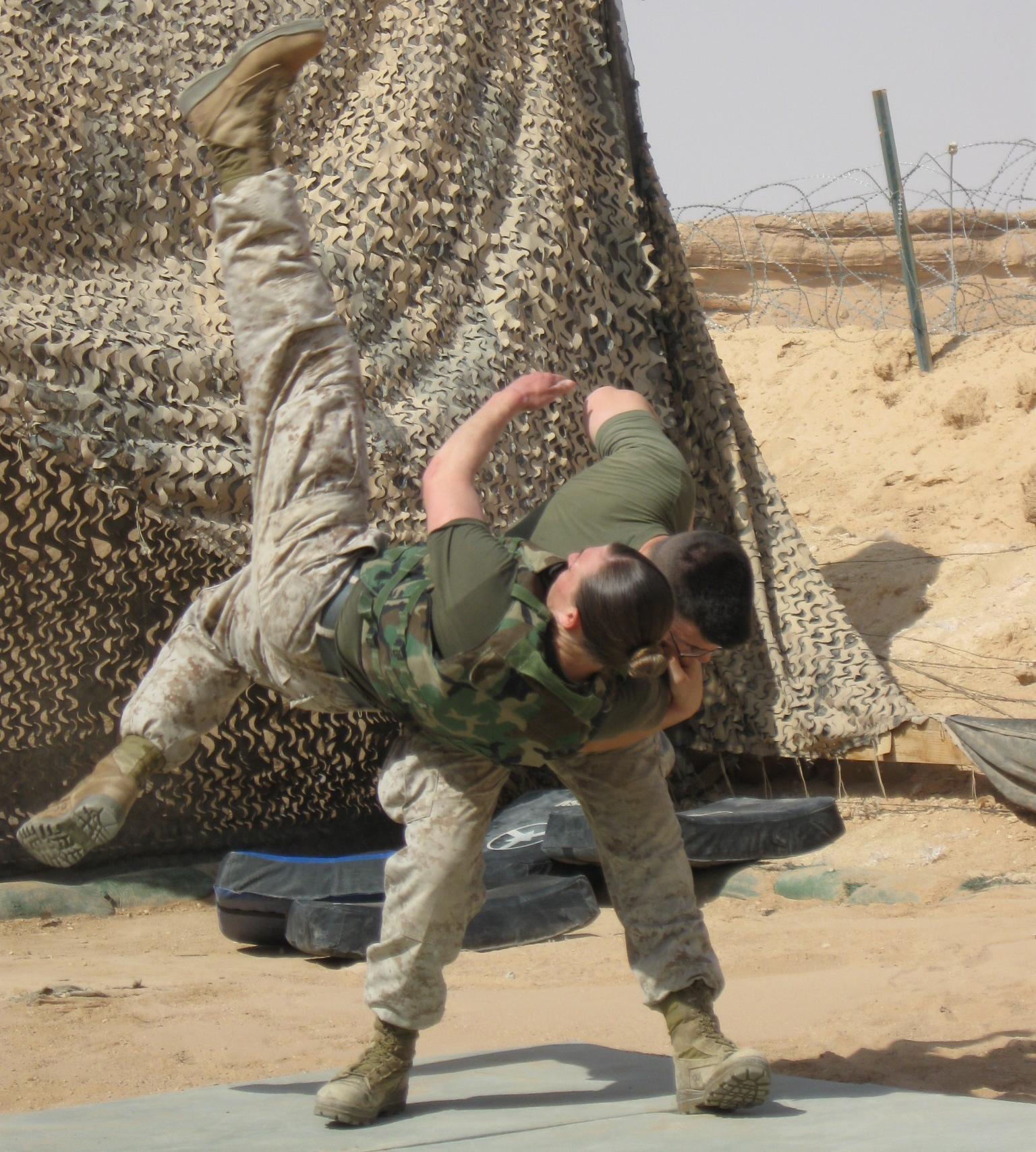
Marines practice throws.

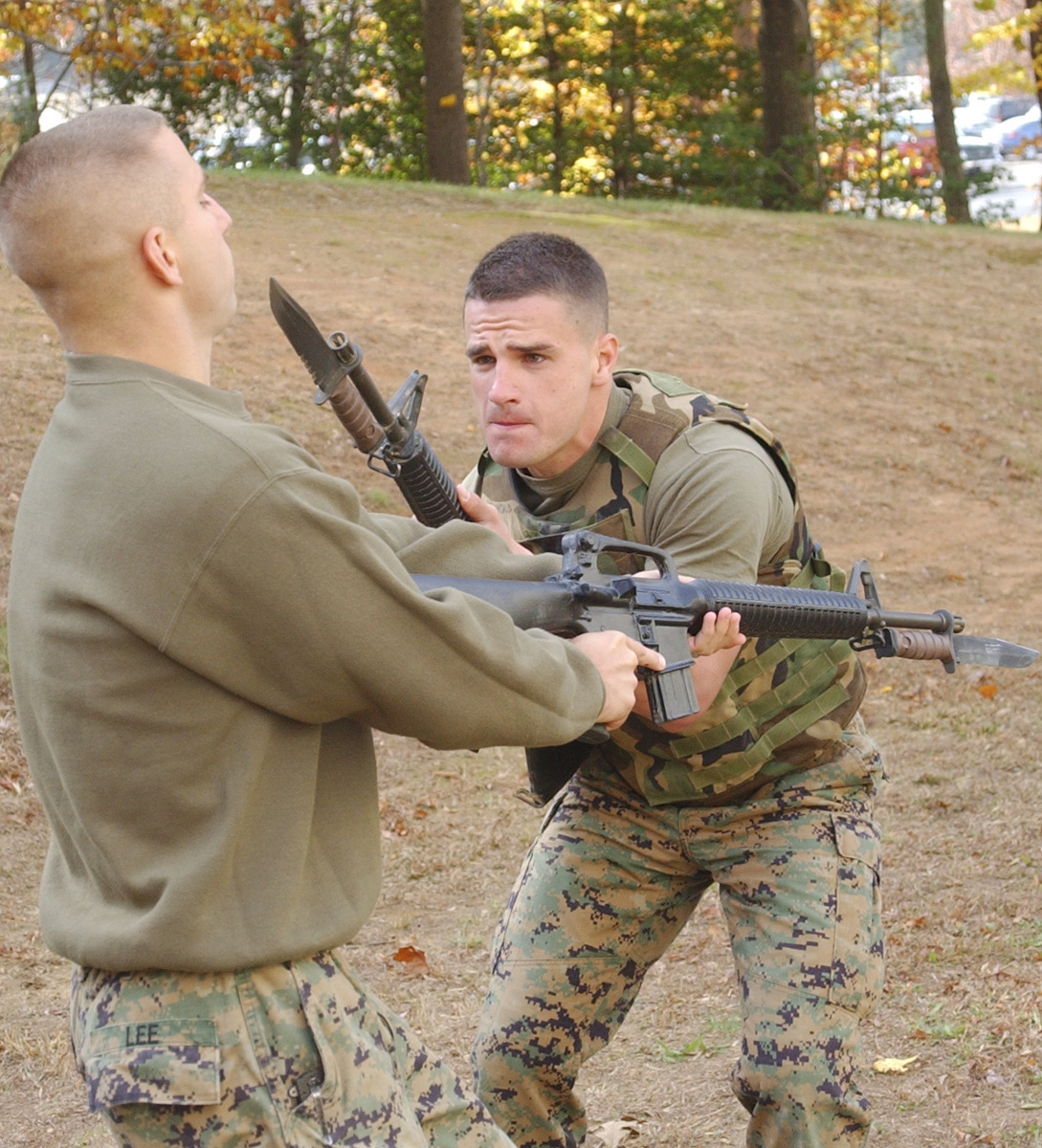
Marines practice bayonet techniques.

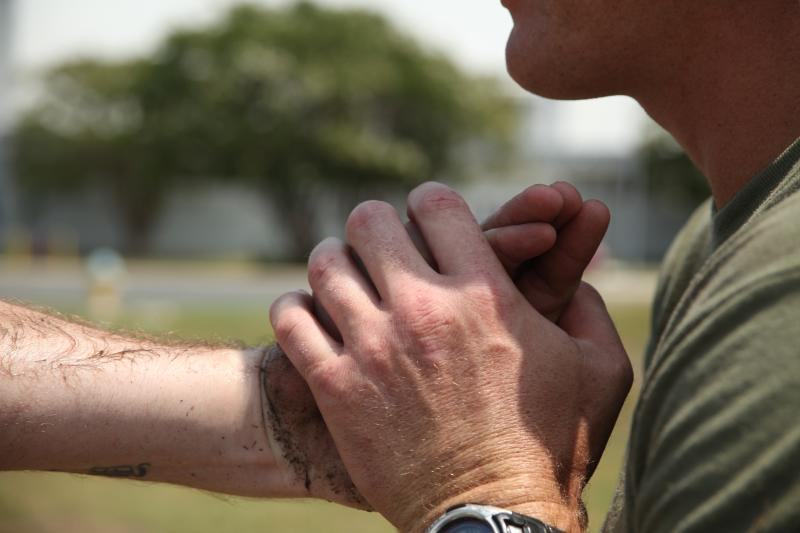
Marines practice unarmed manipulations.

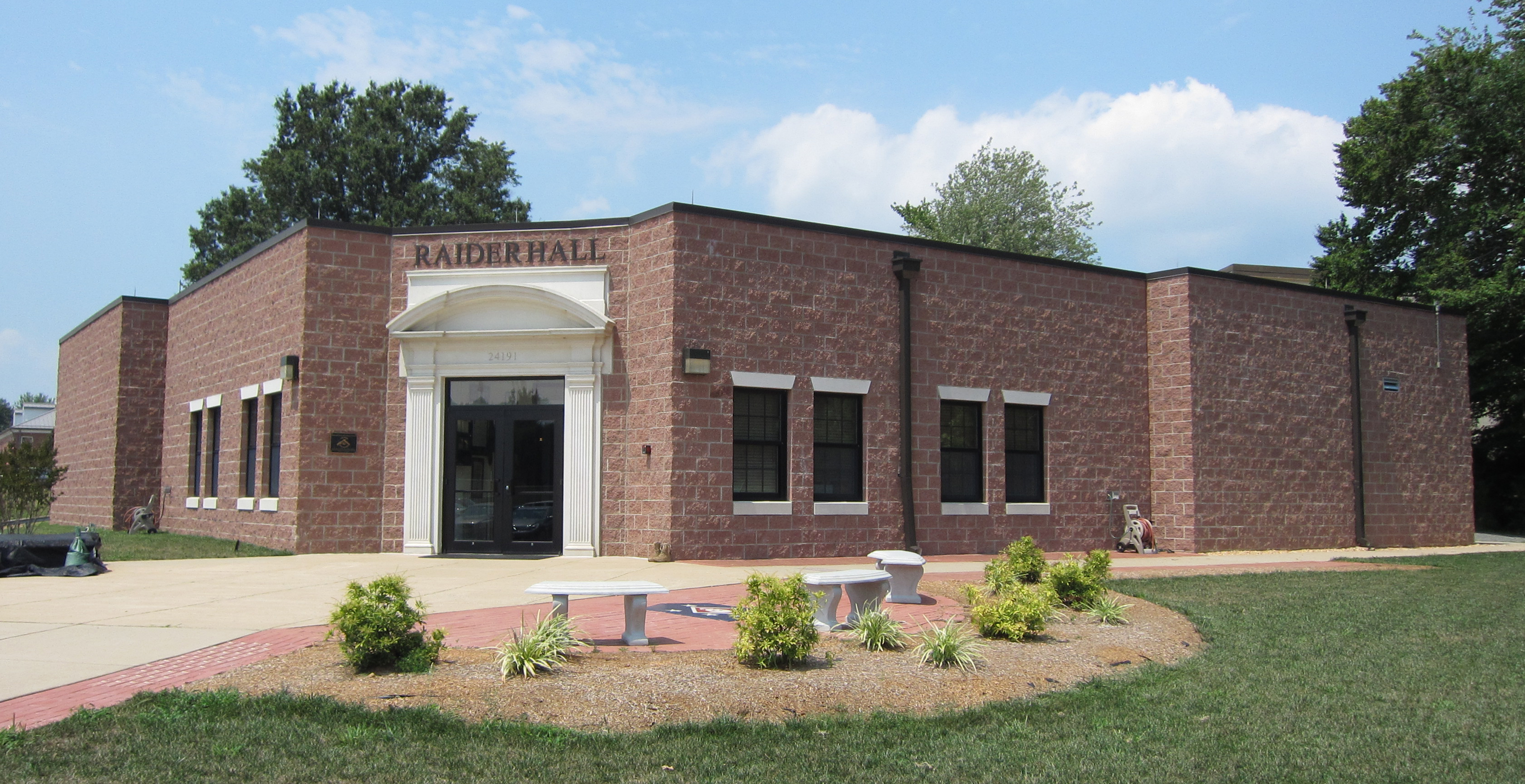
Raider Hall, home of Marine Corps Martial Arts Center of Excellence.

The techniques used by MCMAP vary in degrees of lethality, allowing the user to select the most appropriate (usually the least) amount of force. For example, a Marine facing a nonviolent but noncompliant subject can use an unarmed restraint to force compliance with minimal damage and pain. A more aggressive subject could be met with a choke, hold, or a strike. Lethal force can be used on a subject as a last resort. The majority of techniques can be defensive or offensive in use, with or without a weapon; allowing Marines flexibility in combat and operations other than war (such as civil control or humanitarian missions, as well as self-defense). An instructor can augment the circumstances of training to better fit the unit's mission, such as military police practicing after being exposed to pepper spray.

=== Tan Belt ===
The tan belt syllabus focuses on the development of the basics of armed and unarmed combat. Students start with the basic warrior stance and break-falls are taught for safety, then move to:

- Basic punches, uppercuts, and hooks
- Basic upper-body strikes, including the eye gouge, hammer fists, and elbow strikes
- Basic lower-body strikes, including kicks, knee strikes, and stomps
- Basic bayonet techniques
- Basic chokes, joint locks, and throws
- Counters to strikes, chokes, and holds
- Basic unarmed restraints and armed manipulations
- Basic knife techniques
- Basic weapons of opportunity

In order to obtain a tan belt the student must score 80 %, students can fail no more than 10 techniques. If a student fails testing, he/she must wait a minimum of 24 hours before retesting. The tan belt syllabus is part of The Basic School and recruit training curriculum.

=== Gray Belt ===
The gray belt syllabus expands on the basic techniques with:

- Intermediate bayonet techniques
- Intermediate upper-body strikes including knife-hands (karate chops) and elbow strikes
- Intermediate lower-body strikes including kicks, knee strikes, and stomps
- Intermediate chokes, joint locks, and throws
- Counters to strikes, chokes, and holds
- Intermediate unarmed restraints and arm/wrist manipulations
- Intermediate knife techniques
- Basic ground fighting
- Intermediate weapons of opportunity

In addition to the new techniques learned, the student must show knowledge of the previous belt by executing 5 techniques from tan belt. If a student performs any of the 5 techniques incorrectly, the student fails the testing evaluation. In order to obtain a gray belt the student must score 80%, students can fail no more than 10 techniques. If a student fails testing, he/she must wait a minimum of 24 hours before retesting.

=== Green Belt ===
- Intermediate knife techniques
- Intermediate weapon of opportunity techniques (blocking)
- Intermediate ground fighting with arm bars
- Intermediate bayonet training
- Intermediate chokes (from the side)
- Intermediate throws from the shoulder
- Lower body strikes
- Counters to strikes
- Unarmed joint manipulations with enhanced pain compliance

=== Brown Belt ===
- advanced bayonet techniques
- advanced ground fighting and chokes
- advanced throws
- unarmed vs. handheld weapons
- firearm retention
- firearm disarmament
- advanced knife techniques

=== Black Belt 1st Degree ===
- advanced bayonet techniques
- advanced chokes, holds, and throws
- advanced ground fighting
- basic counter-firearm techniques
- advanced upper-body strikes, including strikes and smashes
- advanced knife techniques
- pressure points
- improvised weapons
- counterattacks

=== Black Belt 2nd Degree ===
- rifle vs. rifle
- short weapon vs. rifle
- unarmed vs. rifle
