= David Dangerfield =

Australian matrial arts instructor

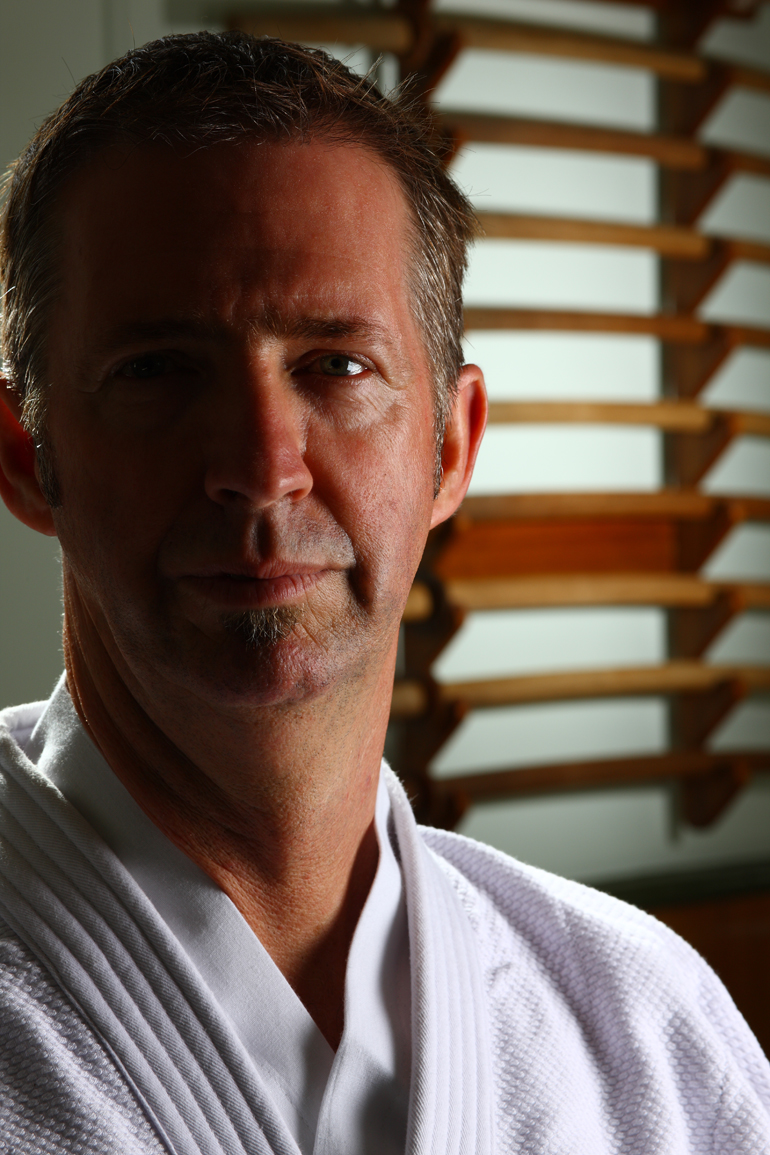
- Born: David Graydon Dangerfield; Brisbane, Australia
- Nationality: (Australia) Australian
- Style: Kenshinkan Aikido, Shinto Muso Ryu
- Teachers: Nishioka Tsuneo, Tsutomu Chida, Morihiro Saito, Kyoichi Inoue, Gozo Shioda
- Rank: Kancho (6th Dan, Aikido); Shomokuroku (Shinto Muso Ryu)
- Years active: 1974–present

Other information
- Occupation: Kenshinryu Chief Instructor; The Compass Institute CEO
- Website: http://www.kenshin.com.au http://www.compassinc.org.au
- Last updated on: 3 June 2013

David Graydon Dangerfield (Born in Brisbane, Australia) is a prominent Japanese martial arts instructor.

== Martial arts history ==
In 1984, David Dangerfield had his first encounter with Aikido. Upon seeing a demonstration, he was immediately attracted to the formal and structured nature of the art, combined with its visual beauty and obvious potential effectiveness. Dangerfield had been training in various martial arts since 1974, including Shotokan karate and Chinese boxing, and had experience in the security industry. In 1986 he began training in the Aikikai style of Aikido. He learned from various instructors, the most memorable being the occasional seminars with Takeda Sensei. In 1990 he obtained his Shodan (first degree of black belt).

In 1991, Dangerfield began his study of Yoshinkan Aikido with Joe Thambu Shihan of Aikido Shudokan. Dangerfield officially founded the Aikido Institute Inc. in 1991 as a nonprofit organization to train martial artists on Queensland's Sunshine Coast. The Aikido Institute was a full-time dojo that provided alternative educational programs based on Aikido for young people in local schools. Dangerfield earned his nidan (second black belt) in 1993, at which time Dangerfield began traveling to Japan to deepen his understanding of Aikido and Budo in general. Twice a year, he traveled to Japan for month-long training trips, where he trained at the Yoshinkan Hombu Dojo under Inoue Kyoichi Sensei and Chida Tsutomu Sensei. He also traveled occasionally to the Aikikai Hombu Dojo in Tokyo and several times to Iwama, where he trained with Saito Morihiro Sensei.

In 1996, Dangerfield received his sandan, by which time he had been teaching full-time for 4 years. In 1997, Dangerfield met Nishioka Tsuneo Sensei, a senior master of Shintō Musō-ryū. This meeting had a great impact on Dangerfield, and he found his personal direction and 'style' becoming clearer. 2000 marked the year he was accepted as a student of Nishioka Sensei and continued his studies in that Kobudo.

In 2003 Nishioka Sensei awarded Dangerfield Oku Iri Sho and in 2006 he became one of the few people to receive the traditional certification 'Shomokuroku' from Nishioka Sensei. That same year, he received his yondan (4th degree black belt) in Yoshinkan Aikido. Most recently, Dangerfield was promoted to rokudan (6th degree black belt) in the art of Aikido during the 2012 celebration of the 100th anniversary of Aikido in Malaysia.

Due to changes in the Yoshinkai Foundation, Dangerfield and other notable Yoshinkan teachers around the world resigned from the organization. Since then, Dangerfield has practiced and taught both Aikido and Shinto Muso Ryu under the Kenshinryu 剣神流. He is currently the Head Master of the Kenshinryu and CEO of Compass.

In 2014, Dangerfield's first book: Martial Reflections - In Search of Wisdom was published by Icon Publishing. It is a collection of short stories that combine practicality, Budo philosophy, and poetic imagery. In 2014, David was also awarded the Sunshine Coast Australian Citizen of the Year award for his pioneering work with at-risk youth, alternative education, and for his contribution to the disability field.

Also in 2014, Compass Institute was named the winner of the Knowledge Industries & Professional Services Large Business Award at the Sunshine Coast Business Awards.

== Budo and education ==
A college-trained instructor with more than 20 years of experience, Dangerfield has combined his martial arts skills with education in a variety of ways. David Dangerfield pioneered the use of Aikido as an alternative educational framework in Australia with intensive behavior management programs for at-risk youth that expanded to include leadership development, special needs, personal safety, and teacher training. Between 1992 and 2006, more than 7,000 students participated in Aikido-based life skills programs in schools in southeast Queensland. Topics covered in the programs include martial values, time management, self-identity, nutrition, relationship management and, of course, personal safety and self-defense. In 2001, Dangerfield conducted a series of workshops for many of Queensland's Paralympic athletes, teaching them the technical and psycho-emotional training aspects of Aikido.

== Budo and business ==
Dangerfield has also taught workshops in the corporate sector.

== Budo and people with disabilities ==
In 2003 David Dangerfield founded The Compass Institute Inc, Australia's first accredited disability service based on the principles of Japanese Budo. The Compass Institute Inc. provides after-school educational, training and vocational opportunities to young people with mental and/or physical disabilities. The curriculum for the centers includes regular training in Aikido and Shinto Muso Ryu Jodo. In 2015, The Compass Institute Inc. is a registered charity that employs more than 40 professionals and supports over 90 young people with mental and/or physical disabilities in 6 centers from Caboolture to Gladstone. One of these centers is the working farm where about 40 young people have access to further training in animal husbandry, horticulture, gardening and grounds maintenance.

== Awards and honors ==
- Citizen of the Year Award- Sunshine Coast Australia Day Awards 2014
- Community Group or organization Nominee- Sunshine Coast Australia Day Awards 2014 (Compass)
- Shomokuroku- Awarded by Nishioka Tsuneo Sensei 2006
- 6th Dan in the Art of Aikido- Awarded by Thamby Raja Sensei Malaysia 2012
- Outstanding Service Provider 2004 (Compass)
- Leadership Award - Sunshine Coast Business Awards 2015
- Not for Profit Business Award - Sunshine Coast Business Awards 2015 (Compass)
- Social Responsibility Award - Sunshine Coast Business Awards 2015 (Compass)
