= Aikido styles =

Styles of the Japanese martial art

Though the art of aikido is characteristically different from other Japanese martial arts, it has a variety of identifiable styles within the family of organizations descending from the teachings of Morihei Ueshiba.

== Pre-war aikido ==
In the pre-war period, aikido was still in formation and had not yet established itself as a separate art from that of Daito-ryu aiki-jujutsu. However, it was fast attaining an identity of its own. In 1942, the Dai Nippon Butoku Kai, in its efforts to standardize Japanese martial arts, came to an agreement with representatives of Ueshiba's school that the name aikido would be used to refer to the jujitsu derived art form Ueshiba had brought to prominence.

The first style derived from Ueshiba's aikido was:

- Yoseikan aikido, begun by Minoru Mochizuki in 1931.

== Post-war aikido (first 40 years) ==
In the post war period, the Aikikai Foundation led by the Ueshiba family has become the most successful organisation in terms of growth in numbers and prominence in the public eye. However, it was not the first to bring aikido to prominence in Japan in the immediate post-war period.

Immediately after the war, due to the ban on martial arts imposed by occupying US forces, aikido was not being taught in Tokyo. A number of students including Koichi Tohei and Gozo Shioda took it upon themselves to become active in disseminating aikido. Some years later, Kisshomaru Ueshiba, the Founder's son, began to actively revive the Aikikai Headquarters in Tokyo.

From the post-war period until the 1980s, numerous aikido organizations evolved in parallel to the main branch led by the Ueshiba family.

The earliest independent styles to emerge were

- Yoshinkan aikido, founded by Gozo Shioda in 1955,
- Shodokan Aikido, founded by Kenji Tomiki in 1967.
- Shin'ei Taidō (親英体道) is a style closely related to aikido, founded in 1956 by Noriaki Inoue (井上 鑑昭 Inoue Noriaki, 1902–1994), a nephew and pre-war student of Morihei Ueshiba.

The emergence of these styles pre-dated Ueshiba's death and did not cause any major upheavals when they were formalized. Shodokan aikido did cause some controversy as it introduced a unique rule-based competition that some felt was contrary to the spirit of aikido.

After Ueshiba's death, more senior students branched out on their own to establish independent schools.

- Iwama Ryu - This style evolved from Ueshiba's retirement in Iwama, Japan, and the teaching methodology of long-term student Morihiro Saito. It is unofficially referred to as the "Iwama style". Saito's students have split into two groups; one remaining with the Aikikai and the other forming the independent organization Shinshin Aikishuren Kai (神信合気修練会) in 2004 around Saito's son Hitohiro Saito (斎藤 仁弘 Saitō Hitohiro, born 1957).
- Ki Society - Another event that caused significant controversy was the departure of the Aikikai Hombu Dojo's chief instructor Koichi Tohei, in 1974. Tohei left as a result of a disagreement with the son of the founder, Kisshomaru Ueshiba (植芝 吉祥丸 Ueshiba Kisshōmaru, 1921–1999), who at that time headed the Aikikai Foundation. The disagreement was over the proper role of ki development in regular aikido training. After Tohei left, he formed his own style, called Shin Shin Toitsu aikido, and the organization which governs it, the Ki Society.

Other important styles and organizations include:

- Yamaguchi Style, referring to the highly influential Seigo Yamaguchi.
- Manseikan Aikido, founded by Kanshu Sunadomari.
- Nishio Style, referring to the style of Shoji Nishio.
- Wadokai Aikido - Suenaka-ha Tetsugaku-ho, founded by Roy Suenaka in 1975.
- The Kokusai Aikidō Kenshūkai Kobayashi Hirokazu Ha, or Kobayashi aikido, founded by Hirokazu Kobayashi.
- Tendoryu aikido (天道流合気道 Tendō-ryū Aikidō), founded by Kenji Shimizu (清水 健二 Shimizu Kenji, born 1940) in 1982. He founded the "Shimizu Dojo" in 1969 and renamed it the Tendokan (天道館 Tendōkan) in 1975.
- Shingu Style, referring to the students of Michio Hikitsuchi.

== Aikido of the modern period (1980 - present) ==
Today, the Aikikai Foundation is an umbrella organization, home to numerous senior teachers and sub-organizations with their own teaching methods and technical characteristics. Leadership of the group has remained centered on the Ueshiba family, and is currently headed by the founder's grandson, Moriteru Ueshiba (植芝 守央 Ueshiba Moriteru, born 1951).

The current generation of senior teachers continue to branch out on their own, with the senior students of the senior students of the Founder (grand-students) coming to prominence in their own right.

- Kokikai Aikido International, founded in 1986 by Shuji Maruyama (Maruyama Shuji, born 1940).
- Yoshokai, Renshinkai and Shinwakan, founded by senior instructors from the Yoshinkan.
- Fugakukai International Association, founded in 1982, has roots in the Shodokan style but without the competition element.
- Aikido Yuishinkai, founded in 1996 by Koretoshi Maruyama (born 1936), a former Ki Society chief instructor.
- Keijutsukai Aikido (警術会合気道), established in February 1980 by Thomas H. Makiyama.
- Seidokan Aikido, founded in 1981 by Roderick Kobayashi, a former top Ki Society instructor.
- The independent Nippon Kan, founded by Gaku Homma with emphasis on "community support".

== Martial arts that use the term "aikido" but are different ==
The above styles can trace their lineage through senior students back to the founder of aikido, Morihei Ueshiba. Two other prominent martial arts use the name aikido but are not directly related. They are Korindo aikido founded by Minoru Hirai (平井 稔 Hirai Minoru, 1903–1998) and Nihon Goshin aikido (日本護身合気道 Nihon Goshin Aikidō) founded by Shodo Morita 書道森田. This school teaches select standing techniques of the Daitoryu Aikijujutsu Hiden Mokuroku and the striking techniques that are very similar to the Okinawan forms of karate such as Gojuryu. There is currently one large main group and several small groups teaching this style. (Though some speculate that Shodo Morita may have known or even trained with Morihei Ueshiba, we have no evidence)(Morita Shodo, fl. c. 1930s–1962). These schools, with some historical justification, suggest that the name aikido is not the exclusive domain of arts derived from the teachings of Morihei Ueshiba.

=== Shoot Aikido ===
Shoot Aikido (シュート・アイキドウ, Shūto aikidou) is a style founded Fumio Sakurai and promoted by Aikido S.A., International Practical Aikido Federation . (Note: 国際実践合気道連盟 合気道S.A., Kokusai jissen aikidō renmei aikidō S. A.) A descendant style of Yoshinkan Aikido, Fumio Sakurai was a student of Gozo Shioda. It aims to create a more realistic combat version of Aikido and promotes tournaments where practitioners from styles other than Aikido are welcome.

=== Full Contact Aikido ===
Full Contact Aikido (フルコンタクト合気道, Furukontakuto aikidō) is a style advocated by Hatenkai (覇天会 or はてんかい), an aikido organization based in Yokohama which hosts the International Aikido Federation. It is characterized as a "fusion of aikido technique and full contact fighting".
