= Jacques Payet =

French aikido practitioner

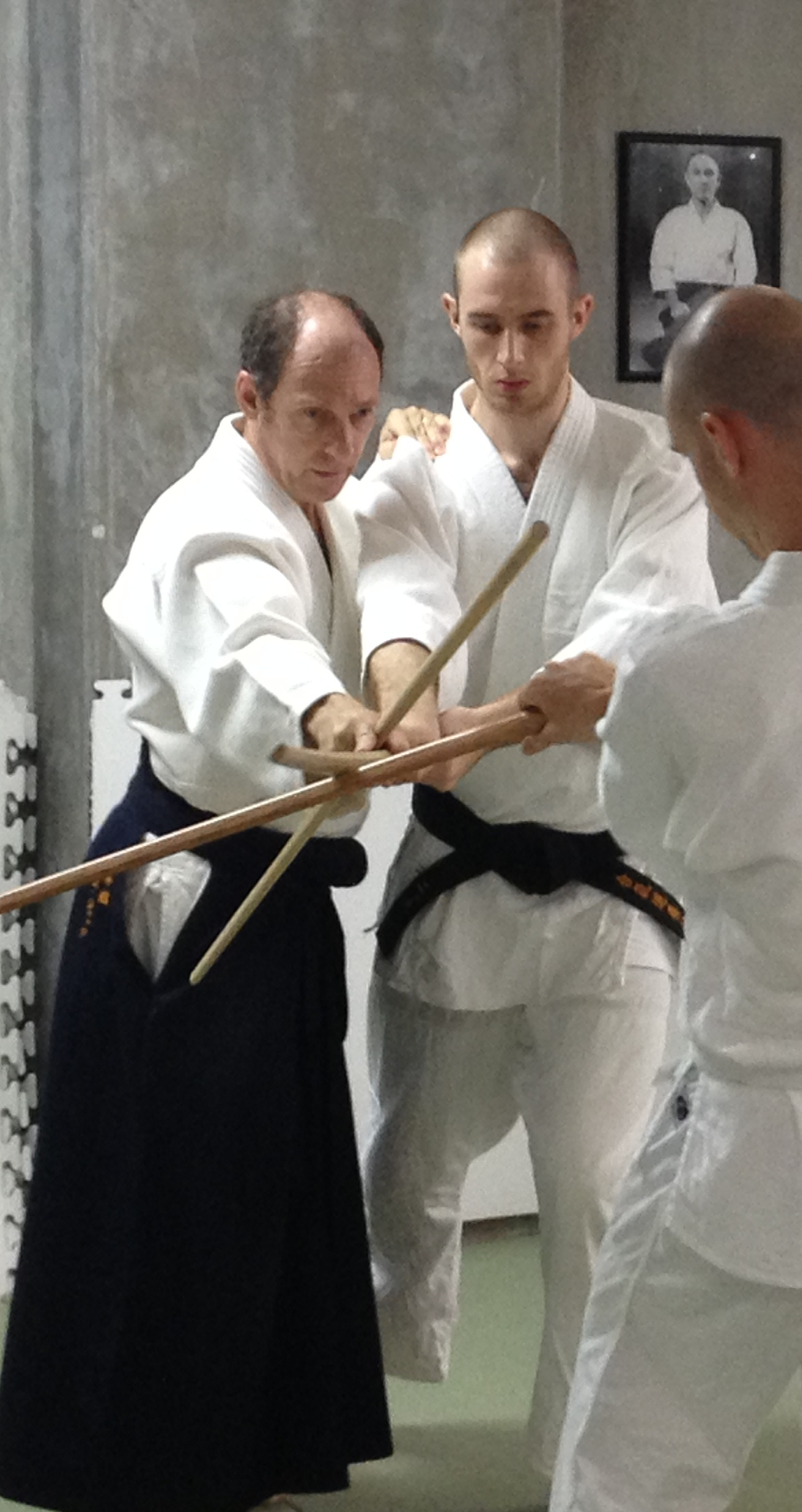
- Payet teaching at Mugenjuku dojo in Kyoto
- Born: August 24, 1957 (age 69); Réunion, France
- Other names: ジャック・パイエ, Жак Пайе
- Nationality: French
- Style: Yoshinkan aikido (養神館 合気道)
- Teachers: Gozo Shioda (塩田 剛三), Takafumi Takeno (竹野 髙文)
- Rank: 8th-degree black belt (八段, hachidan), Shihan (師範, shihan)
- Years active: 1980–1994, 2000-present

Other information
- Website: www.aikidomugenjuku.com
- Last updated on: September 9, 2014

Jacques Payet (ジャック・パイエ, born August 24, 1957) is a practitioner of Yoshinkan-style aikido. He was the longest-serving non-Japanese uchi-deshi of Yoshinkan founder Gozo Shioda and is ranked Hachidan (八段; "8th degree") in the Yoshinkan organization, with the honorific Shihan (師範; "mentor and model"). He is the founder and head instructor of Mugenjuku dojo and the Mugenjuku Kenshusei program in Kyoto, Japan. He is also the originator of the well-known Senshusei Course, a translator of several important works in aikido, and a guest instructor in demand around the world.

== Early life ==
Payet was born and grew up in the commune of Saint-Leu in the French region of Réunion, an island in the Indian Ocean near Mauritius. As a boy, he became interested in Bruce Lee and studied karate.

In 1976 he was a teacher in the Saint-Leu neighborhood of Le Plate but decided to pursue his education further by attending the Université de Lyon, where he did an IUT, which he followed by conscription service in the French army in 1979–1980.

== Training at the Yoshinkan dojo ==
While finishing academic studies in France, Payet was practicing jujutsu and attended a seminar in 1978 at which he saw a film of Yoshinkan founder Gozo Shioda, whom he believed to be a jujutsu practitioner due to a language barrier. Determined to meet Shioda, Payet traveled to Japan in September 1980. He arrived without any information about Shioda's location but was able to find the Yoshinkan dojo with the assistance of a French speaking Japanese student at Tokyo University.

=== Uchi-deshi of Gozo Shioda ===
When Payet arrived at the Yoshinkan in 1980, most classes were taught by Takafumi Takeno. Although regular students at the Yoshinkan did not have an opportunity to train with him, Payet was introduced to Gozo Shioda by his son, Yasuhisa Shioda. Following the introduction, Payet was offered the opportunity to live and train in the dojo full-time for a few months. His stay was extended several times until the beginning of the dojo's next special police training course in April 1981, at which time Payet officially became an uchi-deshi in the Yoshinkan dojo. Payet was Shioda's deshi from that time until Shioda's death in 1994. He lived in Japan as a direct disciple of Shioda for two periods, 1980 - 1985 and 1989 - 1993.

As an uchi-deshi, Payet trained 6 hours per day plus time spent providing services for the dojo. He also trained with the Kidotai (警視庁 機動隊, Keishichō Kidōtai; Tokyo Metropolitan Riot Police) 2-3 times per week for 3 years and 5 days per week for 1 year. At the time, the Senshusei Course did not exist, but the Yoshinkan dojo trained the Kidotai, and uchi-deshi filled in when any of the police were absent.

== Overseas instruction ==
=== France and England ===
After living as uchi-deshi to Gozo Shioda for 5 years, Payet returned to France in 1986 with the intention of teaching aikido. However, the legal and political situation in France at the time made it prohibitively difficult to teach aikido. As a result, when he had the opportunity in 1987, he moved to England, where he had been teaching for two years already. He lived in London from 1987 to 1988 and was appointed technical director of the English Aikido Yoshinkan Federation. However, in 1988, Payet decided he was unsatisfied with his own practice of aikido and requested that he be allowed to return to Japan to continue studying at the Yoshinkan dojo.

=== United States ===
From 2000 to 2005, Payet lived and taught in the United States. On moving to the US, Payet made a tour of the country, visiting dojos and observing the state of aikido practice and aikido instruction throughout the country. He initially settled in Minnesota but eventually moved to California, where he taught in the University of California system. In 2001, with the assistance of Kevin Pickard, he founded Mugenjuku dojo in Los Angeles (now "Aikido on Ventura" dojo under David Fryberger, 5th-dan).

=== Annual seminars ===
Payet is a popular seminar instructor and makes trips to dojos in the United States, England and Russia annually in addition to giving seminars at corporations and universities in Japan. He was present at Gozo Shioda's last overseas demonstration in Germany in 1988. He travels once every two months for about 1–2 weeks, and, in addition to the US, Europe and Russia, he has given seminars in Israel, Qatar, Canada, Poland, Germany, Italy, and Ukraine.

In addition to travel seminars, Payet has developed relationships with dojos and individuals around the world, and people occasionally travel to Kyoto for special training or rank testing under his supervision.

== Business and higher education ==
After moving to Europe in the 1980s, Payet represented several Japanese companies in France and England. In the 1990s, he worked in a government tourism office and opened his own company.

From 1997, he attended the Centre d’Enseignement et de Recherche Appliqués au Management (CERAM) in Sophia Antipolis, near Nice, majoring in Business Management. While in Nice, he also worked for the Institute for Advanced Research Minoru (IMRA), a Japanese cold fusion research lab.

Eventually, he moved to the United States and began teaching in the University of California higher education system. While teaching, he opened two dojos, in Orange County and near Hollywood.

=== Mugenjuku dojo ===
Payet's Studio City dojo on Ventura Boulevard near Hollywood opened in 2001 and was named Mugenjuku (無限塾, mugen-juku; lit. "no-limits-coaching-school"). The Japanese word juku (塾) has the connotation of a small, intimate school with a limited number of students and close contact with the teacher (as contrasted with, for example, a university lecture); it is typically used in Japan to describe specialized preparatory schools and is often translated into English as "cram school". Mugen (無限) means "infinite". The name can interpreted as à double entente, meaning either "the school of endless training" or "the school for learning how to go beyond limitations". When Payet moved to Kyoto in 2005, leadership of that school passed to David Fryberger, Yoshinkan 5th-dan, and the school's name is now "Aikido on Ventura".

== Kyoto, Japan ==
Payet returned to Japan in May 2005, settling in Kyoto as the assistant director of ITEC (Institute for Technology, Enterprise and Competitiveness) at Doshisha University. In Kyoto, Payet initially pursued aikido training on his own without taking on students. However, while training in Doshisha athletic facilities, he attracted the attention of onlookers and eventually began teaching aikido in Kyoto informally in 2007.

=== Kyoto Mugenjuku dojo ===
In 2008, Payet opened a formal dojo in Kyoto with the assistance of shidoin (指導員, shidōin; "instructors") Yutaka Kikuchi and Masahiro Nakatsuka. The name of the dojo was originally "Mugenjuku-Kyoto" (京都 合気道無限塾, Kyōto aikidō-mugenjuku) to distinguish it from the Los Angeles branch. Payet wanted a traditional facility rather than a gymnasium for training and found Shiramine Jingū, which has a dojo on its grounds. Payet performs an embu (演武, enbu; "budo demonstration") there every year at the shrine's Budo Festival (武道奨励繁栄祭, Budō shōrei han'ei-sai; lit. "martial arts encourage prosperity festival").

Since 2009, branch dojos have opened in Osaka and in Kyoto at Kamigamo Shrine, near Fushimi-Inari Shrine, in the Kojinguchi neighborhood and near the Shijo-Karasuma intersection.

In February 2013, the branch dojos were amalgamated into a facility at the corner of Marutamachi and Kamanza streets, to form the Marutamachi Dojo. This Honbu dojo was again relocated next to Karasuma-Oike Station in 2020. The current name of the dojo is simply Aikido Mugenjuku, and current main shidoin are Yasuda Atsushi, 5th-dan (who graduated from the first year of the Kenshusei Course) and Aoi Kataoka, 5th-dan (a long time member of the weekend kenshusei course).

In March 2019, Mugenjuku dojo hosted a 10th-year anniversary demonstration at the Kyoto Butokuden. This demonstration was joined by Aikido officials and Shihan from more than 10 different countries, Kyoto city officials, and hundreds of Aikido practitioners. All who attended celebrated the life and teaching of Payet Sensei and their connection and fellowship through Mugenjuku dojo.

== Yoshinkan Senshusei Course ==
Payet designed and organised the original international Senshusei Course (専修生 コース, senshūsei kōsu), in which foreign students can enroll in the special training course given to the Kidotai (警視庁 機動隊, Keishichō Kidōtai; Tokyo Metropolitan Riot Police). Prior to 1991, the special riot police training was available to Japanese and to uchi-deshi but not to regular foreign students training at the Yoshinkan dojo. Payet observed that most foreign students could achieve technical proficiency up through the 1st or 2nd dan ranks, but did not have an opportunity to advance after that. Payet conceived of the Course and the IYAF (International Yoshinkan Aikido Federation) as a way of building up qualified foreign instructors who could promote the Yoshinkan style of aikido outside Japan. With the approval of Gozo Shioda, Payet developed a plan for a foreign instructor training course to run concurrently with the special police course. The plan was approved, and Payet organised 12 students for the first course, which was held in 1991–1992.

== Translation and Publications ==
While at the Yoshinkan dojo, Payet acted as a translator during the visit of foreign guests, including the famous visit of boxing champion Mike Tyson and his promoter Don King. He also took care of foreign correspondence for the dojo and served on the staff of the Aikido Yoshinkan International Newsletter.

- Shioda, G. Aikido Shugyo: Harmony in Confrontation. Trans J.Payet & C.Johnston. Shindokan Books: 2002. ISBN 0-9687791-2-3.
- Shioda, G. Aikido Jinsei: My Life in Aikido. Trans C.Johnston & J.Payet. Shindokan Books: 2011. ISBN 978-1-77084-229-8.
- Shioda, G. Aikido: My Spiritual Journey. Afterword Y.Shioda. Kodansha USA: 2013. ISBN 978-1-56836-411-7.
- Payet, J. Uchideshi: Walking with the Master - Learning What Cannot Be Taught. Shindokan Books: 2020. ISBN 978-0-2285-0319-4.

=== Aikido Shugyo ===
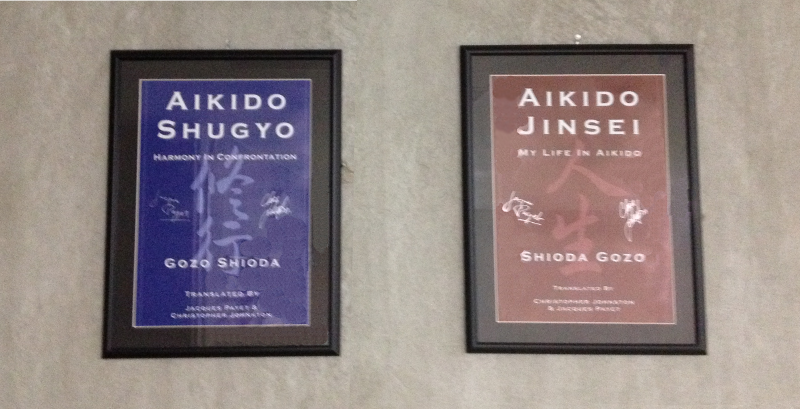
Framed cover designs for Aikido Shugyo and Aikido Jinsei autographed by Payet & Johnston.

When Payet was uchi-deshi at the Yoshinkan, there was a notebook full of technical information and anecdotes of Gozo Shioda. Payet taught himself to read Japanese with the aim of translating this notebook. In 1991, the notebook was released in Japanese, and Canadian aikido practitioner Christopher Johnston made a translation of the book. Together, Payet and Johnston worked with the Yoshinkan hombu and produced an English translation of the book under the title Aikido Shugyo: Harmony in Confrontation, published by Shindokan Books.

=== Aikido Jinsei ===
Gozo Shioda's autobiography was originally published in Japanese in 1985. Following the success of their translation of Aikido Shugyo, Payet again worked with Christopher Johnston and the Yoshinkan hombu to produce an English translation of the autobiography under the title Aikido Jinsei: My Life in Aikido, also published by Shindokan Books.

=== Aikido ===
In 2013, Gozo Shioda's son, Yasuhisa Shioda, produced a book of anecdotes about Gozo Shioda and translations of his writing under the title Aikido: My Spiritual Journey, published by Kodansha USA. Payet acted as a translator for portions of this work, while his deshi Chris Crampton, 4th-dan, proofread some of the English text.

=== Uchideshi ===
Published in 2020 and subtitled Walking with the Master: Learning What Cannot Be Taught, Uchideshi chronicles the life of a young Jacques Payet during his first arrival in Japan, acceptance into the Yoshinkan Dojo, and his subsequent years of training under the direction of Yoshinkan Founder, Gozo Shioda Sensei. Uchideshi conveys the hardships faced by practitioners during the "Koganei Era", as noted by Payet Sensei's training partner, and at the time fellow uchi-deshi, Tsuneo Ando Shihan. Through narratives and anecdotes curated from Payet Sensei's personal diaries, he communicates numerous aspects of what daily life for a foreigner practicing shugyo and budo in Japan as an uchi-deshi is like.

== Media appearances ==
=== Books ===
Payet is mentioned several times in Robert Twigger's book Angry White Pyjamas, about the author's experiences on the 3rd Senshusei Course (1993-1994). In particular, in an extended passage that is set at the funeral of Gozo Shioda, Twigger says he "plucked up the courage" to speak to Payet and reports a subsequent conversation. For the content in this passage, the author visited Payet in France to conduct an interview while preparing to write the book following his graduation from the course.

=== Television ===
Payet and his Mugenjuku dojo have appeared on TV in Japan several times. In 2011, Payet appeared in a video produced by the travel program YAJIKITA ON THE ROAD. In 2013, former world champion boxer and TV comedian Guts Ishimatsu tried to film a program with Payet although he was traveling in Russia; instead, Guts filmed at Mugenjuku with Payet's deshi. In 2014, Payet appeared on a comedy sketch filmed in Tokyo.

In 2018, Payet Shihan and his Kyoto Mugenjuku Dojo hosted champion fighter and TV personality Nogueira Minotauro as a part of an Aikido featured episode of The 3rd Degree. Season 2 Episode 4 features training, instruction, conversation, and demonstrations of Aikido shared between these two men as they tour various dojos and historical locations in Kyoto, Japan.

=== Other ===
In 2010, Payet and his deshi participated in neuropsychology research that lead to the seminar "Japanese spirituality seen in aikido".

In 2020, Payet Shihan was part of the #keeptheflamealive interview series hosted by Thambu Shihan in which the history of Yoshinkan Aikido was discussed from a first-hand perspective.

== Kenshusei Course ==
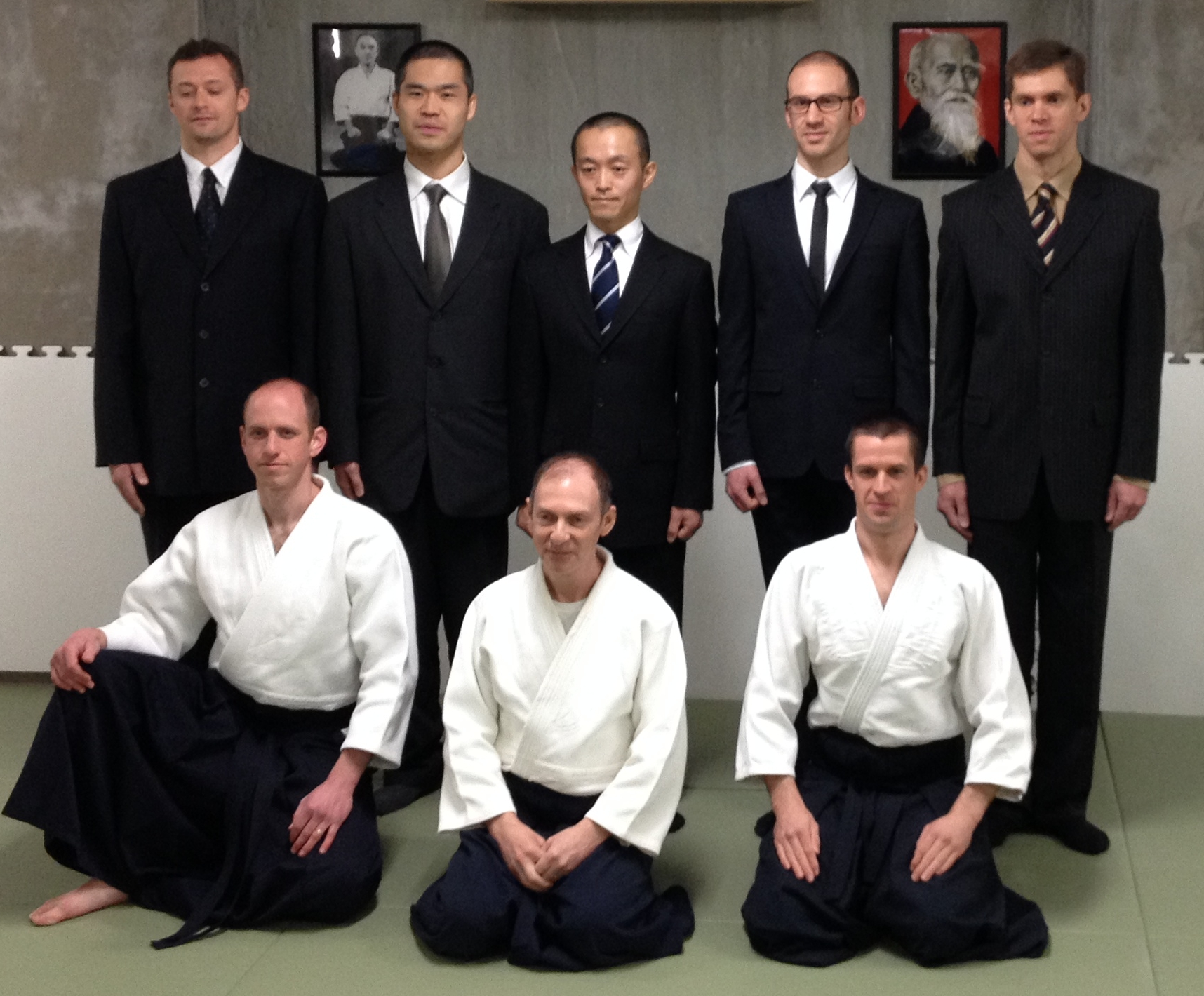
Kenshusei Dai Sanki, March 2014

The Kenshusei Course (研修生, kenshūsei; "trainee") is an 11-month-long training course offered at Mugenjuku. Payet designed the course based on his experiences working on the hombu Senshusei Course in 1990-1993 but also on his personal philosophy of aikido, combining the "spirit cultivation" of Senshusei with his own training methods that teach balance and personal development.

The Kenshusei Course begins April 1 each year (following the Japanese pattern) and runs for 11 months, ending the last day of February. Enrollees train a minimum of 4 hours per day, 5 days per week and participate in "physically taxing" activities. The course breaks only for the holidays of Golden Week, Obon, and New Year. The course includes two embu: one in early May for Shiramine Shrine's budo festival and one in early November for the annual Yoshinkan Embu Taikai in Tokyo. Students also participate in other special events connected to aikido or Japanese culture, such as visiting the grave of aikido founder Morihei Ueshiba in Wakayama and participating in the dojo's Kagami Biraki and Gashuku (合宿, gasshuku; "training camp"). In addition to Payet and the kenshusei, course participants include instructors, assistant instructors, and sewanin (世話人, sewanin; "helper, mediator").

The Kenshusei Dai Ikki (第一期, dai-ikki; "first term, first course, first class") was in 2012-13 and included three students from Japan, Quebec, and the UK. Dai Niki (second course, 2013–14) included three students from Japan and the United States. Dai Sanki includes five students from Japan, France, Russia and the United States.

Payet also offers a Part-Time Kenshusei course, which meets on Saturday nights and Sunday mornings and is appropriate for older individuals or those with full-time jobs. He teaches this course entirely by himself.

== See also ==
- List of aikidoka
