= Robert Mustard =

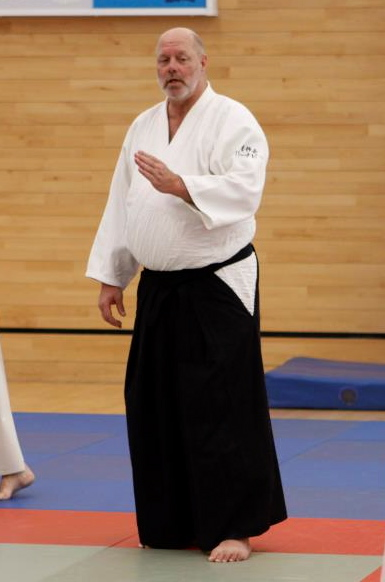
- Robert Mustard at a seminar in Dartford, England
- Born: May 19, 1956 (age 70); Toronto, Ontario, Canada
- Style: Yoshinkan Aikido,
- Teachers: Gozo Shioda, Takafumi Takeno, Tsutomu Chida, Takeshi Kimeda
- Rank: Shihan (8th Dan, Yoshinkan Aikido)
- Years active: 1977–present

Other information
- Website: http://aikidoburnaby.com
- Last updated on: December 18, 2013

Robert Mustard Shihan (May 19, 1956, in Toronto, Canada) is a teacher of Yoshinkan Aikido. He is currently ranked 8th Dan.

== Early life ==
Born in Toronto on May 19, 1956. Robert Mustard took to sports at an early age, playing hockey and Canadian football. His introduction to martial arts came through Kung Fu instructors Jack Chin and James Lore, who trained him for five years. He underwent kendo training under Larry Nakamura, Shigeo Kimura and Masatoshi Tagawa for five years and achieved the rank of ni-dan.

== Yoshinkan Aikido training ==
In 1977, Mustard traveled to the United States to participate in a kendo demonstration at a martial art convention and saw a demonstration by Takashi Kushida, which galvanized his interest to train in an aikido dojo. He was introduced to Yoshinkan Aikido at college where he joined a club led by Takeshi Kimeda, and would train under him for over a decade. For a time, he practiced Kung Fu, kendo and aikido together, but later changed focus to just aikido. He would rise to the rank of san-dan under Kimeda's instruction.

On March 30, 1986, he traveled to Japan to train at the Yoshinkan hombu dojo with an introduction letter from Kimeda and gifts for the instructors and uchi deshi as is customary. Mustard described the first sessions he watched of Gozo Shioda's black belt class, as a "magic class". In May of that year, he enrolled into the senshusei training program. He trained for 9 years at the hombu dojo under Gozo Shioda's leadership. Mustard does not consider himself to be a direct student of Gozo Shioda, because his instruction was mainly under Takafumi Takeno and Tsutomu Chida. One year after Gozo Shioda's death, Robert Mustard and his wife Carol left Japan and settled in Vancouver, BC and opened the Aikido Yoshinkai Burnaby dojo in Burnaby, British Columbia. Robert Mustard attained the rank of Nana-dan (7th degree black belt) in December 2006, and was awarded the title of Shihan in August 2011. He was awarded Hachi-dan (8th degree black belt) by the Yoshinkan Honbu Dojo in November 2014.

== Current Teaching ==
On July 7, 2023, Mustard officially resigned from the Aikido Yoshinkai Foundation. He now heads his own independent association—Aikido Shobukai—with headquarters in Burnaby, B.C., just outside of Vancouver, Canada.

Mustard continues to be in demand for seminars throughout North America and Europe. He frequently teaches with other senior Yoshinkan-style teachers including Jacques Payet Shihan and Joe Thambu Shihan.

== Media ==
In 2011, Mustard released 3 DVD set including teachings from his Gasshuku seminars in the UK

Robert Mustard is featured in the book Angry White Pyjamas by Robert Twigger. The book depicts the life of a trainee undergoing the senshusei training program.
