= Joe Thambu =

Malaysian-Australian martial artist (born 1961)

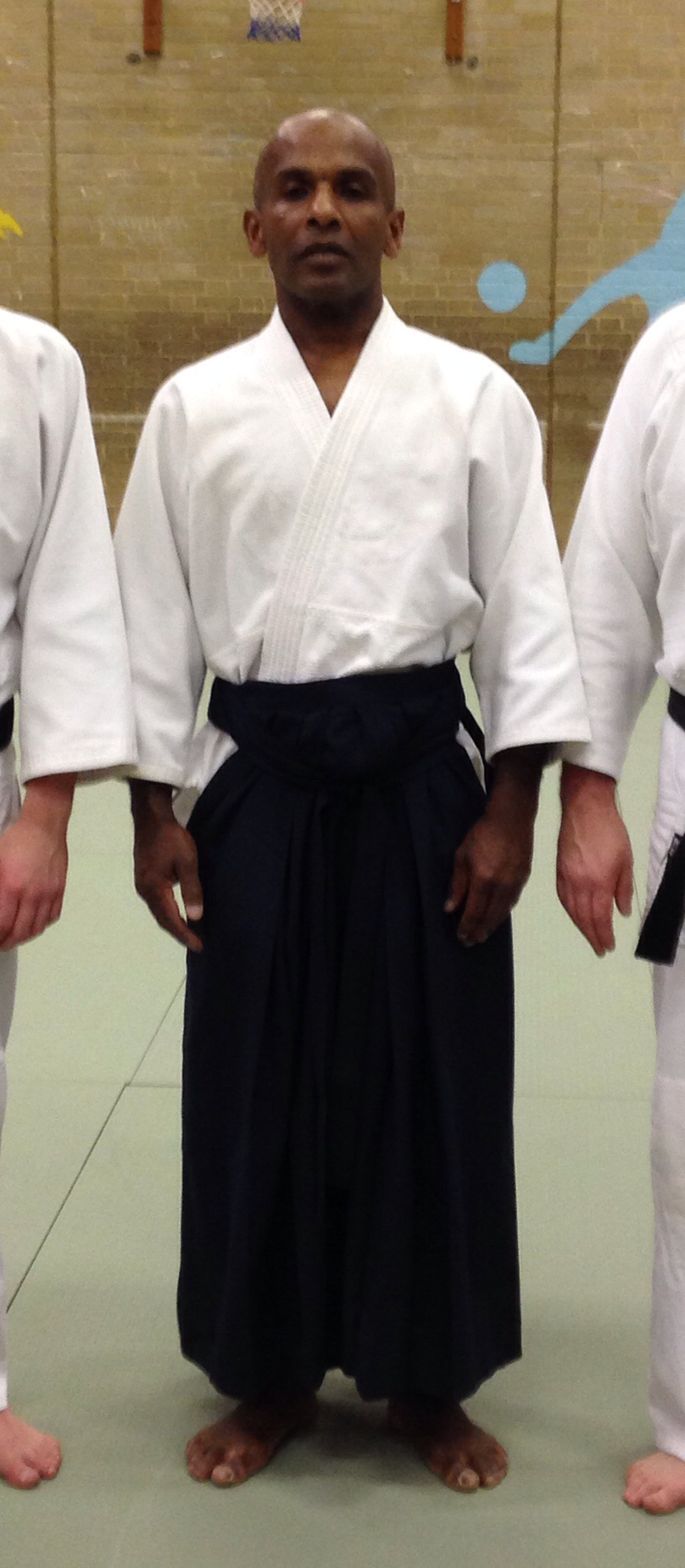
- Joe Thambu after a seminar in the UK, November 2011
- Born: Joseph Haridas Thambu; 24 March 1961 (age 65); Seremban, Malaysia
- Nationality: Australian
- Style: Yoshinkan Aikido, Shudokan Aikido
- Teachers: Thamby Rajah, Gozo Shioda, Kyoichi Inoue, Toshishiro Obata, Takafumi Takeno, Tsutomu Chida
- Rank: Shihan (8th Dan, Yoshinkan Aikido)
- Years active: 1972–present

Other information
- Website: http://www.aikidoshudokan.com
- Last updated on: 13 April 2010

Joseph 'Joe' Haridas Thambu Shihan (24 March 1961 in Seremban, Malaysia) is a teacher of Yoshinkan Aikido, currently ranked 8th Dan.

== Personal history ==
Thambu was the third youngest of eight children from Malaysian Tamil heritage. He began his training in 1972, at the age of 11, training under his uncle, Thamby Rajah. Thamby Rajah is credited as the first Malaysian to grade to black belt in both Aikido and Judo. Internationally famous martial artists were frequent visitors to his uncle's school in Seremban, Malaysia. Among these were Donn F. Draeger, a prolific martial arts historian and researcher who wrote over 30 books on Eastern martial arts. Draeger was expert in Judo, Karate and Jōdō and was the first non-Japanese to be ranked Menkyo-Kaiden (teaching certificate) in the classical system of Shintō Musō-ryū Jodo.

Other notable visitors included Junichiro Yagi Sensei (8th Dan), and former Yoshinkan Aikido Shihan (master title), as well as Kenji Shimizu Sensei, a past headmaster of Muso Shinto Ryu Jodo.

In 1980, Thambu emigrated to Melbourne, Australia to undertake tertiary studies. After reportedly being unable to find an Aikido school with a training ethic to equal his experience in Malaysia, he began teaching Aikido.

In 1983, Thambu first travelled to Japan to further his Aikido training. Whilst in Japan, he trained at the Yoshinkan Hombu dojo in Koganei. While living in Japan he received instruction from teachers including Gozo Shioda, Kyoichi Inoue, Takafumi Takeno, Tsutomu Chida, Hitoshi Nakano, and then assistants Jacques Payet and Tsuneo Ando. From this time onwards, Thambu focused on the modern Yoshinkan syllabus, including knowledge from his earlier training.

Thambu was the first person to teach, and disseminate Yoshinkan Aikido in Australia. On his return to Australia from Japan in 1983, he established his first premises at 308 Saint Georges Road, Thornbury in Melbourne (Australia). This became the first of two permanent homes for his school.

Thambu returned to Japan numerous times in the years from 1983–2000, generally training a few weeks at a time, testing and/or demonstrating at the annual All Japan Yoshinkan Aikido Demonstration.

In 1993 Thambu became the last person to be graded by Yoshinkan founder Gozo Shioda, before his death in mid-1994. At only 32 years of age, he became the youngest non-Japanese to be awarded a 5th Dan in Yoshinkan Aikido. This record has since been passed onto Thambu's former student, Jon Marshall, who was awarded 5th Dan in 2006 at Yoshinkan Hombu.

== Awards ==
In acknowledgment for his dedication to Aikido, Thambu was awarded his seventh dan by Shioda Yasuhisa, the former head of Yoshinkan Aikido in December 2007, and was promoted to the rank of "Shihan" in October 2008.

On 8 July 2012, he was awarded an honorary doctorate by the Asia Pacific Open University for his lifelong commitment and contribution to the martial arts.

Thambu was awarded his eighth dan by Kyoichi Inoue, former director of Yoshinkan Aikido in November 2015.

== Current teaching ==
Since 2000, Thambu has taught widely outside of Australia, generally at the invitation of younger teachers in other countries. Thambu continues to teach from his school in Melbourne, Australia, frequently hosting students from overseas, of whom, many are aspiring teachers staying for extended periods, coming from countries such as the United Kingdom, Poland, Malaysia and Indonesia. Including annually at the Shudokan UK's Summer school with Robert Mustard and Ken Robson.

== Shudokan ==
The words "Shudokan Aikido" have sometimes been misconstrued as a separate style to Yoshinkan Aikido. Thamby Rajah (Thambu's uncle and original teacher) has always taught a natural derivative of the techniques he learned at Yoshinkan Hombu Dojo. Rajah's technique is also influenced by extensive experience in Judo at the Kodokan, and his earlier Jujitsu training under Walter De Silva in Malaysia during the post war years.

== Awards and honors ==
- Awarded 5th Dan by Gozo Shioda Kancho, Sept 1993
- Awarded 6th Dan by Hideo Yamada Kaicho, Dec 2001
- Awarded 7th Dan by Shioda Yasuhisa, Dec 2007
- Awarded 8th Dan by Kyoichi Inoue, Nov 2015
- Tokubetsu Embushou (Special Demonstration Award), 50th All Japan Yoshinkan Aikido Demonstration, 2005
- Awarded title of Shihan (master) by Aikido Yoshinkai International, 2007
- Blitz Magazine, Aikido Instructor of the Year, 1997
