= Ryusei Sagusa =

Yoshinkan aikido master

Ryusei Sagusa (三枝龍生 Sagusa Ryusei) is a Yoshinkan aikido master. He spent many years as an uchi-deshi of Yoshinkan founder Gozo Shioda.

== Publications ==
- 体は何でも知っている (ちくま文庫) 2010.
