= Angry White Pyjamas =

1997 book by Robert Twigger

- Author: Robert Twigger
- Language: English
- Published: 1997

Angry White Pyjamas is a book written by Robert Twigger about his time in a one-year intensive program of studying Yoshinkan aikido.

== Summary ==
The book is set in Tokyo in the mid-1990s. Twigger is living with two friends in a tiny apartment near central Tokyo. They all decide to enrol at the Yoshinkan Hombu Dojo in order to get fit and break out of their sedentary life-style.

Soon after beginning regular training, Twigger decides that the only way to truly experience aikido is to do the Yoshinkan Senshusei course, a gruelling 11-month program to train up instructors of Yoshinkan aikido. The course consists of four hours of training, five days a week, in addition to dojo-cleaning duties, special training weekends and demonstrations.

Twigger spends most of his time describing the rigor and sometimes agony of the very intensive course. He refers to doing kneeling techniques, or suwari-waza, until his knees bled, only to practice the next day and in so doing tear open the scabs. He describes techniques being performed with such vigor and intensity that smashing one's head into the mat was a frequent occurrence.

Other experiences on the course include "hajime" sessions where one technique is performed repeatedly, without a break, sometimes for up to half-an-hour or more. During these sessions, trainees sometimes pass out or vomit, especially in the summer months. Instructors sometimes dish out punishments to trainees if they feel they are not pushing themselves enough, including rounds of push-ups, sit-ups and bunny hops.

Other people featured in the book include several top Yoshinkan instructors, including Chida, Shioda and Chino, as well as Robert Mustard, the chief foreign instructor, David Rubens from England and Darren Friend from Australia. Teachers are sometimes portrayed as being quite cold and occasionally brutal and unsympathetic to the students, whom they are trying to push to greater and greater efforts in order to build their technique and "spirit".

In addition, Twigger describes other aspects of Tokyo and his life there, including his relationship with his girlfriend and her family, his work at a Japanese high-school as an English teacher, and stories of living with his two flatmates. He also gives thoughts and observations about Japan and Japanese culture.

The book was awarded the William Hill Sports Book of the Year in 1998.

== See also ==
- Uchi-deshi
