= Aikido S.A. =

Japanese martial art

Aikidō S. A. (合気道S.A.) also known as Shoot Aikido (シュート・アイキドウ, Shūto aikidou) is a Japanese martial art. It was founded by Fumio Sakurai (currently Aikido S.A. representative instructor), who was ranked 6th in the Yoshinkan Aikido, trained under the style's founder, Gozo Shioda, for 20 years as an uchideshi of Shioda.

The purpose of Aikido S.A. is development and research of Aikido, to deepen the practice of the art and enhance its practicality in modern self-defense scenarios. Aikido S.A collaborates with other Aikido organizations of Japan.

== Features of Aikido S.A. ==
- Based on Yoshinkan Aikido, striking techniques and kumite / match formats are added. There are 1) actual battle / real aikido rule tournaments, 2) traditional integrated aikido rule tournaments, 3) rookie battle tournaments, and a mix of 1) and 2) where practitioners of from other martial arts schools can also enter. It is characterized by accepting a wide range of athletes and martial artist, rather than having its own Aikido practitioners spar against each other all the time.
- The official name is Aikido S.A., International Practical Aikido Federation (国際実践合気道連盟 合気道S.A., Kokusai jissen aikidō renmei aikidō S. A.). Representative practitioners include Yasunori Okuda, who participated in the Rings Experimental League, early shootwrestling, and J-Cup Tournament.
- The contents of the physical training include basic movements, Kata training, hit rehearsal, wrist sumo (unique competition type for Aikido S.A), Aikido kumite (Aikido technique + hit rehearsal), and sparring. With the introduction of kumite, research on combinations of aikido techniques and reversal techniques has been active, and it is still evolving and developing. During a match, asides Aikido techniques, use of palm strikes and kicking is allowed, and striking under the clavicle is permitted.
- During sparring, it is forbidden to hit vital points such as the face.
- In addition to physical combat, weapon arts, such as tantojutsu, kenjutsu, jōjutsu, as well as disarming is also performed. In addition, the organization hosts "Actual Battle / Real Aikido Championship" tournaments and can be held twice a year (mainly in April, occasionally in October.)
- Aikido S.A. also offers distance learning for people who cannot attend in remote areas.

== Match format ==
As in regular Aikido, there are some schools that play randori and games like the Japan Aikido Association, but the Aikido S.A. events are characterized by calling on martial artists from other styles to participate in the open tournament. Forms of tournament are:

- Real Battle / Real Aikido Rule Tournament
- Traditional Aikido Rule Tournament
- Rookie tournament

== Shoot Aikido reception ==
During the 1980s and 1990s, practitioners of Shoot Aikido participated in Hokutoki Tournaments hosted by Daido juku.

Aikido S.A.'s Shoot Aikido is currently very limited to native Japan. Considering modern reputation of Aikido, it is unlikely there even is a market for Shoot Aikido outside Japan. However, certain instructional DVDs featuring Fumio Sakurai have been released to western public.

== Videos ==
- Shoot Aikido DVD 1: Basic Techniques & Combinations
- Shoot Aikido DVD 2: Offense & Defense in Actual Combat

== See also ==
- Hapkido- South Korean style with similar Aiki-style martial arts heritage and combination of striking moves
- Yoshinkan Aikido - parent style to Shoot Aikido
- Yoshokai Aikido - very similar style, branched from Yoshinkan Aikido as well
- Aikido styles
