= Yasuhisa Shioda =

Yasuhisa Shioda (Japanese: 塩田泰久 born 15 November 1952) is the third Sōke of Yoshinkan aikido, succeeding his brother, Tetsutaro Shioda, in keeping with the iemoto tradition in Japanese martial arts. Their father, Gozo Shioda, founded Yoshinkan aikido. He was Kancho of the headquarters dojo in Shinjuku, Tokyo and headed both the All Japan Yoshinkan Aikido Federation and the International Yoshinkai Aikido Federation until he left the organization in 2012. In 2014 he founded the SIAF together with his son Masahiro Shioda.

He graduated from the economics faculty of Chuo University and lived in England for 3 years. He actively teaches aikido in Japan, through published books and travels throughout the world.

== Early life and career ==
Yasuhisa Shioda started practising Aikido at the age of 13, training every day. He graduated in 1971 from the Economics Department of Chuo University in Tokyo. As a member of the Yoshinkan Aikido Dojo he continued to undergo aikido training with his father, the founder of Yoshinkan Gozo Shioda Sensei, and spread aikido by teaching it in universities, and to police departments, and various other organizations. From 1980 he spent three years in England, and helped establish the basis for the spread of aikido overseas. After returning to Japan he concentrated on teaching young people, especially nursery school children, originating a unique instruction method that encouraged them to develop their character through the practice of aikido. He also teaches at community centers.

After Gozo Shioda's death in 1994, in order to spread his father's legacy throughout the world, he has been teaching aikido and has also become an author. In 2007, he became the new Yoshinkan Kancho, and also the Third Soke of Yoshinkan Aikido. These days he trained different students in different age in Dojo that is near from Takadanobaba Station with Other Professional Sensei(Teacher) like Takafumi Takeno (9th DAN), Tsuneo Ando (8th DAN), Takehiko Sonoda (8th DAN), Jacques Payet (8th DAN), Susumu Chino (7th DAN), Takayuki Oyamada (7th DAN), etc. In 2012 he left the Yoshinkan organisation, in 2014 he founded his own organization, Shioda International Aikido Federation (SIAF), which so far consists of him and his son Masahiro, offering classes twice per week.
