= Yasuhisa =

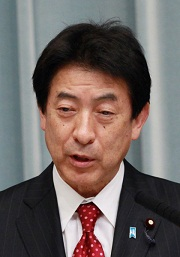
- Yasuhisa Shiozaki, Japanese politician
- Pronunciation: jasɯçisa (IPA)
- Gender: Male

Origin
- Origin: Japanese
- Meaning: Different meanings depending on the kanji used

Yasuhisa is a masculine Japanese given name.

== Written forms ==
Yasuhisa can be written using different combinations of kanji characters. Here are some examples:

- 康久, "healthy, long time"
- 康尚, "healthy, still"
- 康寿, "healthy, long life"
- 靖久, "peaceful, long time"
- 靖尚, "peaceful, still"
- 靖寿, "peaceful, long life"
- 安久, "tranquil, long time"
- 安尚, "tranquil, still"
- 安寿, "tranquil, long life"
- 保久, "preserve, long time"
- 保尚, "preserve, still"
- 保寿, "preserve, long life"
- 泰久, "peaceful, long time"
- 泰尚, "peaceful, still"
- 泰寿, "peaceful, long life"
- 易久, "divination, long time"
- 易寿, "divination, long life"
- 恭久, "respectful, long life"

The name can also be written in hiragana やすひさ or katakana ヤスヒサ.

== Notable people with the name ==
- Yasuhisa Furuhara (古原 靖久) (born 1986), Japanese actor
- Yasuhisa Shioda (塩田 泰久) (born 1952), Japanese aikidoka
- Yasuhisa Shiozaki (塩崎 恭久) (born 1950), Japanese politician
- Yasuhisa Toyota (豊田 泰久), Japanese acoustical engineer
