= Lou Zhenggang =

Chinese artist

- Born: July 8, 1966; Heilongjiang
- Known for: Calligraphy, Painting

Lou Zhenggang (Chinese: 婁正綱, pronounced "Lo Jeng Gong" in English, "Ro Sei Ko" in Japanese; born July 8, 1966, in Heilongjiang, China) is a prominent contemporary Chinese artist. Trained in calligraphy from an early age, she attained national fame as a child prodigy, was sent to a government-sponsored fine arts academy and trained by China's masters of calligraphy and ink painting. She won numerous competitions and exhibited both at home and abroad. At the age of 20, Lou moved to Japan, where she soon had several highly acclaimed exhibitions, wrote illustrated columns for prominent local magazines and was featured regularly on a national television program for three years. Though Lou's work is best known in China and Japan, it has been shown in Paris and New York and is held in numerous collections, both public and private. She continues to live and work in Tokyo.

== Overview: Life and work ==
A summary of Lou's life and work according to an affiliate of the Chinese government states in part: "Lou Zhenggang took up the brush when she was only three. By 12, she had won nationwide recognition as a child prodigy. Her career in art seemed an unending succession of prizes and accolades... Today she is a master of her arts - painting and calligraphy - and seasoned by a maturity in which she has found peace and contentment... Lou Zhenggang's works are in high demand in Japan and United States, whether they be her calligraphy or her painting. Her brush works are prized as gifts from the government of China to visiting dignitaries. Her works are collected and exhibited in over eighty prestigious venues around the globe, including China's Palace Museum, and the United Nations Headquarters. It's well over twenty years, since she was celebrated as an exceptionally gifted prodigy. Today she is among the most influential of Eastern brush artists."

== Art ==
Because Lou was extensively trained in classical Chinese calligraphy, expressions of that tradition formed the initial basis of her art. Even at this time, here style was distinctive: "Lou Zhenggang's earliest works earned praise from senior critics especially for their masculinity and grandeur, qualities seldom found in a female artist." As she entered her twenties, she began to develop a more personal style. Indeed, observers who cannot read Chinese can see in these early works a progression from a strong, formal, masculine style to a more fluid and relaxed approach. As she continued to develop confidence and to experiment with different techniques, her style grew even bolder and less traditional. In Japan, she studied painting with noted nihonga artist Matazo Kayama (加山又造 1927-2004), which led to a flourishing of colorful styles and abstract themes — something she could not have produced if she remained within the pure calligraphic traditions of her youth. She continued to expand her range, developing even more abstract works, including color paintings, silk screens, and classic black ink (sumi) artwork. By the age of 40, she had developed an entirely new painting style, one based upon but transcending calligraphic art, which won her considerable acclaim.

== Biography ==
=== Early years (-to 1986) ===
Lou began to study calligraphy with her father, Lou De Ping, at the age of three. At twelve, she was recognized by the national government as an "exceptionally gifted child." As a certified child prodigy, she received special permission to enroll years early at the Central Academy of Fine Art, where she was taught by masters of calligraphy and ink painting. In 1980, she won first prize at the National Youth Calligraphy Exhibition in China, and one year later was elected a member of the Chinese Calligrapher’s Association. At the age of 14, she was the youngest-ever participant in the Australian-sponsored International Calligraphy Competition, and at 16 she won the Chinese National Calligraphy Competition. In the mid-1980s, she attended Beijing University. In 1985, Hong Kong TV broadcast a documentary about her life and her work. With the support of her government, she traveled to Japan in 1986 and held her first exhibition there, at the Yaesu Gallery in Tokyo.

=== Twenties (1987-1996) ===
In 1987, she moved to Tokyo. The success of her first exhibition led to a second show, which was sponsored by Television Tokyo and the Chinese Embassy. Other shows soon followed, e.g., at the Sogo Group department store galleries in Yokohama and seven other cities. In 1990, a further series of exhibitions (also sponsored by the Sogo Group) considerably enlarged the circle of her admirers and collectors, leading to the 1991 establishment of the Lou Zhenggang Sponsorship Committee, headed by two former prime ministers (Nakasone and Takeshita), a renowned artist and several leading bankers and industrialists. In 1991, she launched a two-year series of exhibitions held across Japan, entitled "Oriental Melody — Lou Zhenggang Calligraphy and Paintings", sponsored by the Yamaha Group. In 1993, she traveled to the U.S. for the first time, presenting a gift of 22 color paintings to UNICEF. The United Nations later issued a "first day cover" stamp issue featuring Lou's work. In May 1993, she held an exhibition at the art gallery inside the main Mitsukoshi store in Nihonbashi, one of the most prestigious venues in Japan. Noted painter Matazo Kayama commented on the show, “Lou...leaves behind her reputation as a child prodigy and steps into a new role as a brilliant young female artist.” Another artist, Goro Koyama, called her “...a genius chosen from among 1.2 billion Chinese.”

=== Thirties (1997-2006) ===
In 1998, Lou donated approximately US$1.5 million to establish the Lou Zhenggang Art Education Development Fund in China. Between 1998 and 2002, she created 34 color silk screen designs in a series entitled “Life and Love” [Seimei to Ai, 生命と愛]. These were radical departures from traditional black-and-white calligraphy, not only due to the bold use of color, but also the abstract images she created. This series is particularly notable for its historical significance: In 2007, the National Museum of China, which had previously not included any abstract works by contemporary artists, changed its policy and decided to add all 34 of Lou’s color works to its permanent collection. Beginning in October 2004, Lou hosted her own program, “Calligraphy of the Heart” [Kokoro no Sho, 心の書] on TV Tokyo, a nationwide television network. In the program, she talked with various Japanese celebrities, each of whom had a special word, saying or personal motto that guided them. Lou would elegantly draw these characters and the two would discuss their meaning on camera. The program continued for almost three years, ending in 2006 just before Lou’s 40th birthday.

=== Fifties (2016~) ===
In 2018, she moved into her current large studio in Izu overlooking Sagami Bay. She spends her days partaking in gardening, raising flowers, and growing vegetables. She also enjoys painting. Visits to her studio are extremely rare as she views them as distractions from her work.

== Recent exhibitions ==
Selected Solo Exhibitions

2025 'Shizen', Almine Rech, London, UK

2025 Lou Zhenggang at Yakushiji—Enjoying the Mountains and Rivers, Nara, Japan

2020 'Sun & Moon Series', Lou Zhenggang and Lalique Collaboration (Paris, London, Zurich)

2018 'Lou Zhenggang: Mimu: Dream of Tomorrow', Ginza Six, Tokyo, Japan

2016 'Lou Zhenggang: Wan Xiang: Harmony and Nature, Royal Opera House, Muscat, Sultanate of Oman

2012 Museum of Contemporary Art, Beijing, China

2008 'Lou Zhenggang 2008: Path of the Heart', Hong Kong Central Plaza, China

2007 'Lou Zhenggang’s World: Words of the Heart', Ueno National Museum, Tokyo, Japan

2005 Tanabata solo exhibition, Shinjuku Park Tower, Tokyo, Japan

2003 'Lou Zhenggang Paintings and Calligraphy: Heart', Sogetsu Kaikan, Tokyo, Japan

2002 Lou Zhenggang exhibition commemorating the 30th anniversary of normalization of diplomatic relations between China and Japan, Takashimaya Department Store, Tokyo and Osaka, Japan

2000 'Lou Zhenggang Works: Life and Love', Ginza Sony Building, Tokyo, Japan

1999 Paris China Festival Day exhibition, 8 Lou Zhenggang ink paintings

1993 Lou Zhenggang solo exhibition, United Nations Headquarters, New York (sponsored by UNICEF)

1993 Mitsukoshi Department Store Art Gallery, Nihonbashi, Tokyo, Japan United Nations Headquarters, New York, NY, US

1991 'Oriental Melody: Lou Zhenggang Calligraphy and Paintings', several Yamaha Group locations in Tokyo, Osaka, Kobe, Fukuoka, Hiroshima, Hamamatsu, Japan

1990 Sogo Department Store, Osaka, Kobe, Hiroshima, Nara, Chiba, Kashiwa, and Yokohama, Japan

1987 Yaesu Gallery, Tokyo, Japan

Selected Group Exhibitions

2023 'ABSTRACTION: The Genesis and Evolution of Abstract Painting Cézanne, Fauvism, Cubism and on to Today', Arizon Museum, Tokyo, Japan

2017 'Power of Art', Hyogo Prefectural Museum of Art, Morioka and Sendai, Japan

== Public collections ==
Lou Zhenggang’s works have been acquired by the following museums and galleries:

National Palace Museum; Beijing Art Museum; Chinese History Museum; Chinese Art Gallery; Beijing Art Museum; Shoudu Museum; Qi Lu Calligraphy and Painting Institute; and the official provincial museums of Zhejiang Province; Jiangsu Province; Jilin Province; Heilongjiang Province; Sichuan Province; Henan Province; Shoanxi Province; Guizhou Province; and Liaoning Province.

== Published works ==
- Lou Zhenggang (2004?). Kokoro [心], Sekai Bunka-sha (Tokyo).
- Lou Zhenggang (2006). Kokoro no Kizuna: Ro Sei Ko no Sho to Jinsei [心の絆ー婁正綱の書と人生], Ascom (Tokyo) ISBN 4-7762-0301-4
- Lou Zhenggang (2006). Kokoro no Kotoba [心の言葉] (English Title: "The 70 Mottoes"), Sekai Bunka-sha (Tokyo) ISBN 4-418-06524-5
- Lou Zhenggang (2007). Seimei to Ai [生命と愛] Silk screen prints to commemorate the inclusion of her work in the National Museum of China collection
- Lou Zhenggang (2008). Kokoro no Sho "Rongo" [心の書「論語」], Kodansha (Tokyo) ISBN 978-4-06-215101-6

== Further information ==
- (2000) Seimei to Ai [生命と愛] (brochure) Fuji Television (Tokyo)
- (2008.02) Sho wa Hito Nari [書は人なり], Waraku [和楽], Shogakukan (Tokyo)
- (2006) Shogaka Ro Sei Ko [書画家 婁正綱] (Lou Zenggang, Painter/Calligrapher) (DVD, produced & sold by KK C.A.L. (www.cal-net.co.jp), Tokyo
