= Micro Master (disambiguation) =

Micro Master was a family of CPU upgrade cards marketed by Aox Inc. for the IBM Personal System/2.

Micro Master, MicroMaster, or Micromaster may also refer to:

- MicroMasters, a series of online graduate level courses offered by some universities
- Transformers: Micromasters, a limited comic book series based on the Transformers franchise
- Micromastery, a 2017 self-help book by Robert Twigger
