= Shudokan Aikido =

- Logo of the Shudokan
- Also known as: Shudokan Institute of Aikido International, Aikido Shudokan International, Shudokan Aikido the Black Belt Academy
- Date founded: 1952
- Country of origin: Japan, Malaysia
- Arts taught: Aikido
- Ancestor arts: Daitō-ryū Aiki-jūjutsu
- Ancestor schools: Yoshinkan
- Practitioners: Thamby Rajah, Joe Thambu
- Official website: http://www.shudokan.co.uk/

Shudokan Aikido is a school that teaches Yoshinkan Aikido. It was established by Thamby Rajah in Seremban, Malaysia, in the early 1950s as the Shudokan Institute of Aikido. Whilst in Japan, Thamby Rajah trained with Shioda Gozo and returned to Malaysia as the first Malaysian Shodan black belt in Judo and in Aikido. The words "Shudokan Aikido" have sometimes been misconstrued as a separate style to Yoshinkan Aikido. Some online sources suggested incorrectly it is a derivation from Aikido and Karate (perhaps due to the similarity in name between Shudokan and Shotokan). However, video and anecdotal sources suggest that Thamby Rajah has always taught a natural derivation of the techniques he learned at Yoshinkan Hombu Dojo (circa 1959). Thamby Rajah's technique is also influenced by extensive experience in Judo at the Kodokan, and his earlier Jujutsu training under Walter De Silva in Malaysia during the post war years. Thamby Rajah's Aikido is fundamentally the same as Yoshinkan Aikido, but is more reflective of the early days of Shioda Gozo's Aikido.

== Etymology ==
The name of Shudokan was given to Thamby Rajah by Shioda Gozo (please confirm in the Thamby Rajah article the name is given by Mifune). The word "Shudokan" is formed of three kanji:

- 修 –Shu – Study, learn
- 道 – dō – Way, path
- 館 –kan – House, place

Therefore, from a purely linguistic point of view, shudokan is the 'place to learn the way' (of the Yoshinkan).

== Style ==
Shudokan Aikido is the Yoshinkan style of Aikido. It is sometimes incorrectly referred to as the "soft" version when compared to the "hard" Yoshinkan. It is a dynamic and combat-effective system of throwing, joint-locks, strikes and pinning techniques. It emphasizes practical efficiency and is the style used to train women and anti-riot teams of the Tokyo Metropolitan Police. There are no tournaments and it is not classed as a sport.

== Lineage ==
The Aikido Shudokan has a clear lineage to traditional Aikido. Ueshiba Morihei, a student of Takeda Sokaku, was the founder of Aikido, a form of budo. A prominent student of Ueshiba, Shioda Gozo, founded the Yoshinkan. After the lifting of the ban of martial arts in the mid-1950s Shioda became the first person to demonstrate aikido to the general public at the very first post war demonstration of budo, attended by around 15,000 people, Shioda won the award for the most outstanding demonstration among almost 150 others, it was soon after this Shioda established the Yoshinkan. In 1961, Shioda became the first person to be awarded a 9th dan rank by Ueshiba. In the mid-1950s a young Malaysian, Thamby Rajah moved to Japan to learn the art of Judo having already trained in gymnastics and some Ju-Jitsu. He trained for a year at the kodokan, with world-renowned teachers Haruyoshi Ichijima and Kyuzo Mifune, becoming the first Malaysian to attain the rank of Shodan in Judo. Before his year was up, Thamby Rajah chanced upon some senior Judo students practising unfamiliar techniques, and upon asking where they learnt such techniques they revealed they were studying Aikido under Shioda of the Yoshinkan. Prior to his departure, Thamby Rajah visited the Yoshinkan himself and decided he would soon return to study this art. In the late 1950s, Thamby Rajah returned to Japan and under Shioda attained Shodan in Yoshinkan Aikido. Thamby Rajah returned to Malaysia, as the first Malaysian with a shodan in both Aikido and Judo, and he set up his first school under the name of Shudokan, the name given to him by Shioda. This was the first aikido dojo in Malaysia and one of the first Yoshinkan Dojo outside Japan.

== Shudokan in Australia ==
At the age of 11 Joe Thambu began his training at the Shudokan Institute of Aikido, the dojo of his uncle Thamby Rajah and at the age of 18 he received his shodan black belt. Thambu established his full-time dojo, Aikido Shudokan, in Australia in 1980 and since 2018 is the chief instructor (Shuseki Shihan) of the Aikido Shudokan International organization. He spends his time teaching at the Aikido Shudokan in Melbourne, but also at dojos affiliated with the ASI in places such as the UK, Indonesia, Malaysia, Canada and Poland.

== Shudokan in the UK ==
Eddie Stratton had a long history in the martial arts. Having trained and taught in numerous countries around the world, teaching martial artists, police and military personnel. At 19 he found himself in Malaysia where he met Thamby Rajah. After watching Thamby Rajah, he thought that as a boxer he could easily overcome him. He was amazed at how this slight man handled and controlled him.

At this point he began taking instruction in aikido directly from Thamby Rajah and on his return from Malaysia, he introduced Yoshinkan aikido for the first time to Great Britain in the early 1960s. He travelled to Japan and trained under Shioda Gozo who later came to England and stayed with Stratton. In 1998, after one of Thamby Rajah's visits to the UK, Stratton received his 9th Dan in aikido. He died on 9 March 2000 after a long fight against cancer. With the passing of Stratton the responsibility of the Shudokan moved to his prodigy Ken Robson who set his base up in Nottingham and operates his full-time dojo from there.

Until 2015 Phil Musson's (a fourth dan student of Ken Robson) dojo, The Eagle Dojo, hosted the annual Shudokan event "Summer School" where Joe Thambu, Robert Mustard and Ken Robson taught a 4-day-long seminar including dan gradings.

Shudokan UK now has dojos in Nottingham, and Devon.
