= Services and supports for people with disabilities =

Service and supports for people with disabilities are those government or other institutional services and supports specifically provided to enable people who have disabilities to participate in society and community life. Some such services and supports are mandated or required by law, some are assisted by technologies that have made it easier to provide the service or support while others are

== Services for developmentally disabled people ==
Developmental disabilities, as defined by the Agency for Developmental Disabilities website, are "severe, life-long disabilities attributable to mental and/or physical impairments which manifest themselves before the age of 22 years and are likely to continue indefinitely. They result in substantial limitations in three or more of the following areas: self-care, comprehension and language, skills (receptive and expressive language), learning, mobility, self-direction, capacity for independent living, economic self-sufficiency, or ability to function independently without coordinated services (continuous need for individually planned and coordinated services). Persons with developmental disabilities use individually planned and coordinated services and supports of their choosing (e.g., housing, employment, education, civil and human rights protection, health care) to live in and to participate in activities in the community." These services and supports are different in every state and there is currently no portability for many of these services state to state.

The mission of The Administration on Developmental Disabilities (ADD), as quoted from their website "ensures that individuals with developmental disabilities and their families participate in the design of and have access to culturally-competent needed community services, individualized supports, and other forms of assistance that promote self-determination, independence, productivity, and integration and inclusion in all facets of community life." Though many supports and services for people with developmental disabilities are offered through other federal and state agencies as well as nonprofit organizations and for profit endeavors, some of ADD Programs/Partners are:

- State Councils on Developmental Disabilities
- State Protection and Advocacy Systems
- National Network of University Centers for Excellence in Developmental Disabilities Education, Research, and Services
  - Minority Partnership
  - National Training Initiatives
- Projects of National Significance
  - Emergency Preparedness Special Initiatives
  - Family Support and Community Access Demonstration Projects
  - Independent Evaluation Information
  - Medicaid Reference Desk
  - National Autism Resource and Information Center
  - State of the States in Developmental Disabilities
  - Access to Integrated Employment
  - The National Residential Information System Project (RISP)
  - Voting Project
  - Youth Information, Training and Resource Center.

== Services for the blind and visually impaired ==
There are a number of services that can be provided for the blind. Guide dogs is one service that is provided for blind and visually impaired people. These service dogs are trained animals that are capable of guiding people from different locations. Also, these dogs are capable of avoiding obstacles and letting the person in service know that there is a step or bump ahead, so a person doesn't get hurt. Guide dogs tend to cost money and not everyone has enough resources to have this service. However, there are some non-profit organizations that help with the expenses to breed, train, and breed a guided dog. "It costs over $50,000 to breed, raise, train, and place one assistance dog; however, all of the Foundations' services are provided at no charge to the individual." Guide Dog Foundation is one of many different foundations that give services to de blind and visually impair people around the United States. There are different acts that the government has signed to help people with guide dogs to enter into places where regular animals are not allowed. There are many different services and help that visually impair people receive on their day. The Braille Alphabet is an information that lets the blind or visually impair read by following some pattern of dots that each will be a letter. "A person who is unable to read standard print material, borrows free of charge, a Braille material. ... This service is provided by a network of libraries around the United States

Accessible Mobile apps are also a new way to help people visually impair. Many of this apps translate writings into audio in which the person can listen to the writings. "Accessible software applications (apps) for smartphones and other mobile devices can be used by those who are visually impaired to read books, newspapers, magazines, and other print material. These apps convert digital text to speech or provide braille output to a compatible braille device".

== Services for the hearing impaired ==
There are many different services that a hearing impair and deaf can receive. Hearing aids is a device that a hearing impair can use in order to hear regular noises and speech. There are different foundations and nonprofit organizations that are able to provide hearing aids to people with hearing loss. Usually people need examinations in order to know which kind of hearing aid they need. Depending if the hearing loss is Sensorineural or Conductive they can receive help. Hearing loss sensorineural is due to the damage of the inner ear, damage to the hair cells. It can be produced due to disease, illness, age, damage due to exposure, etc. Conductive hearing loss is when sound waves cannot travel through the outer or middle ear, this can be because of earwax, fluids in the middle ear, etc. Depending on the type of hearing loss people can get hearing aids that fits their necessities.

STTS (Speech to Text Service) is a term used for the different real time captioning devices where speech and auditory information can be translated into text by a professional. STTS can be used in different environments such as office meetings, classrooms, public speaking events, etc. There are different types of STTS devices and it will work depending on its type, Verbatim or Meaning-to-meaning are two types of STTS devices. Verbatim is the device that translates all the speech in text, including repetitions and misspeaks, this device is known as CARTS (Communication Access Realtime translation). Meaning-to-meaning device is the one that translates the speech into text taking out repetitions and misspeak, two types of devices that meets this type is C-Print and typewell. Depending on the application the individual works, they will be able to decide which devices fits their needs.

- Sign language interpreting

== Services for the mobility-impaired ==
The Americans with Disabilities Act of 1990 was a landmark U.S. federal government move towards providing services for the persons with disabilities in a uniform way all across the country. That legislation has been widely copied in other countries.

== Accessing services for disabled people ==
According to the Americans with disabilities act, people with disabilities are guaranteed equal opportunities when it comes to public accommodation, jobs, transportation, government services and telecommunications. These allow for Americans with disabilities to be able to live as normal lives as possible apart from their disadvantage. In the United States, services for disabled people varies by state and sometimes by location within a state. While Medicaid and Social Security income, both SSI and SSDI, are federally mandated, each state is responsible for administering these programs in their state, as part of their services and supports for disabled people. Each state designs its service delivery system differently and as a result, the portals for entry vary for each state. Some states administer services through a state government agency with subordinate offices throughout the state. Some states contract services out (privatize) and maintain a skeleton state government staff. Being a good advocate or self advocate is necessary to maximize services and supports but several advocacy groups have emerged that provide services, especially health advocacy, for disabled people such as Disability Health Support Australia.

== See also ==
- Developmental disabilities
- Medicaid
- Social Security Disability Insurance
- Assistive device
- The Compass Institute Inc Further education and Vocational Pathways for young people with intellectual disabilities
- European Platform for Rehabilitation
