= Kiyoyuki =

- Gender: Male

Origin
- Origin: Japanese
- Meaning: Different meanings depending on the kanji used

Kiyoyuki (written: 清之 or 精之) is a masculine Japanese given name. Notable people with the name include:

- Terada Kiyoyuki (寺田 精之; 1922–2009), Japanese aikidoka
- Kiyoyuki Yanada (梁田 清之; 1965–2022), Japanese voice actor
