= Senshusei course =

- Focus: Aikido instructor training
- Country of origin: Japan
- Date of formation: 1957
- Creator: Gozo Shioda
- Parenthood: Yoshinkan Aikido
- Official website: Senshusei course

Senshusei course (専修生コース, senshūsei-kōsu) is an intensive, 11-month aikido training programme conducted at Yoshinkan Aikido's honbu dojo (headquarters and main training hall) in Shinjuku, Tokyo, Japan. The course has received attention through Robert Twigger's book, Angry White Pyjamas (1997).

== Course ==
Course participants, themselves referred to as senshūsei, train from April 1 each year to March 1 in the following year. Training takes place from 7:30 AM to 2:00 PM, five days per week, for the duration of the course. The course starts from fundamentals, assuming very little about participants' initial knowledge of aikido, but a high level of physical ability is expected. Participants learn from the instructors of the honbu dojo. The first two months of the course are considered a trial period, and it is common for participants to drop out. In the year that Twigger participated, the number of foreign participants remained constant at 10 participants throughout the entire course. This is a rare occurrence, most courses have a higher drop out rate.

== History ==
The senshusei course was originally created in 1957 by Gozo Shioda, founder of Yoshinkan Aikido, to train the Tokyo riot police. The course has been available to non-police candidates since the 1980s, but was developed primarily for foreign students interested in becoming instructors starting in 1991. There are now two other versions of the course: a less-intensive version for participants aged 40 years or older, and a part-time version taking two years to complete.

== Former instructors ==
Then-9th dan Kyoichi Inoue, shihan, stopped teaching in the senshusei course when he resigned from the Yoshinkan in March 2006 following an internal dispute, later establishing his own branch, Aikido Shinwakan (合氣道親和館). Following Inoue's departure, Tsutomu Chida, 8th dan, and then-chief instructor of the Yoshinkan honbu-dōjō, also broke away, establishing Aikido Renshinkai (合気道錬身会) in 2008, thus ending his teaching in the course.

== See also ==
- Tokyo Metropolitan Police Department
- Uchi-deshi
