= Thomas H. Makiyama =

Thomas H Makiyama
- Born: 1928; Hawaii, United States
- Died: September 9, 2005 of cancer
- Style: Keijutsukai Aikido
- Rank: Shihan, 8th dan

Thomas H. Makiyama (1928–2005), born in Hawaii, was an aikido teacher and founder of Keijutsukai Aikido and the Keijutsukai International Federation (Keijutsukai Kokusai Renmei), based in Tokyo. The organization teaches Keijutsukai Aikido and Keijutsu (a specialized method of defensive tactics for law enforcement personnel).

Makiyama started budō at the age of 18 in 1947 after enlisting in the U.S. Army. He was sent to Japan and was stationed in Yokohama, where he was assigned to the 8th Army’s military police criminal investigation division. At the Isezaki-cho police station in Yokohama he started to train in police judo.

Over the years, he studied judo, jujutsu, Gōjū-ryū karate and aikido among other budō arts. In aikido, he achieved eighth dan (1977) in Yoshinkan aikido and a certification as shihan. He is believed to be the only American with that distinction at the time.

He also contributed to a number of articles for martial arts publications such as Black Belt magazine. Makiyama was the author of one of the first books in English on Aikido in 1960 and the book Keijutsukai Aikido in 1983. In Hawaii, Makiyama was instrumental in forming the first official branch of the Aikido Yoshinkai outside Japan, at the personal request of the late Gozo Shioda, a close friend and professional acquaintance since 1948.

Makiyama created the Keijutsukai (Police/Security Techniques Association) in February 1980 after training as an independent system commenced during the early part of 1979. He was the Keijutsukai Director until his death on September 9, 2005.

== Sources ==
- Frank Paetzold, Wu Shu, Books on Demand GmbH (2003), p 151, ISBN 978-3-8330-0182-6
- Gary Bennett, Aikido Techniques and Tactics, Human Kinetics Europe Ltd (1997), p 24, ISBN 978-0-88011-598-8
- Thomas H Makiyama, The techniques of aikido, Jenkins (1963), ASIN: B0000CLSPM
- Thomas H Makiyama, Keijutsukai Aikido: Japanese Art of Self-defense, Ohara Publications Inc., U.S. (1998), ISBN 978-0-89750-092-0
