= Amos Lee Parker =

American aikido teacher (1936–2013)

Amos Lee Parker (December 12, 1936 – August 19, 2013) was an American aikido teacher. He was ranked 9th dan in Yoshinkan Aikido.

Parker was born the 7th of 16 children in Houston, Texas. At age 18, he joined the United States Navy.

He first came into contact with aikido in 1958 while a member of the US Navy on board the USS Bradford (DD-545). Another member of the crew, Signalman Hill, was demonstrating techniques and Amos was shocked at how easily Hill was able control him and others.

In 1962, Amos Parker received his orders to Japan and was deployed to the Yokosuka Naval Base. The Monday after his arrival he found an aikido dojo on base that was under the direction of Yukio Noguchi, 8th dan Yoshinkan Aikido. His training with Noguchi only lasted a couple of months as the latter accepted an invitation to teach aikido in Hawaii. Aikido classes were taken over by Kiyoyuki Terada, 10th dan. Amos Parker would spend the next 30+ years training and teaching in Japan.

Amos Parker received his Shihan in 1986, making him the first non-Japanese instructor to receive such an honor. In 1995, he received the rank of hachidan (8th dan) and in January 2010 he was awarded the rank of 9th dan by the Aikido Yoshinkai Foundation making him the highest ranking non-Japanese Yoshinkan Aikido instructor in the world. Amos Parker is senior to many of the Japanese shihan and served as a presiding judge at several yearly embutaikai's (demonstrations)

Amos Parker resided in his hometown of Houston, Texas. He traveled several times during the year to teach clinics in London, Ontario, Indianapolis, IN, Detroit, MI and Sacramento, CA. He has also been invited to other schools in California, Minnesota, Texas, Canada, Brazil, England and The Kingdom of Bahrain. In 2005, along with members of the Seikeikan USA, he participated in a special demonstration in Oakland, CA for some 200+ kids at the East Oakland YMCA.

== US Naval Career ==
Amos Parker's US Naval career began in 1956 at the age of 20. He served honorably until his retirement in 1976. Throughout his Naval career he spent the majority of his time within the US 7th Fleet in the Pacific, including supporting the Vietnam War. Below are the main highlights of his time in the US Navy.

1956: Enlists in the US Navy. Reports for basic training and the Naval Training Center (NTC) in San Diego, California. Upon graduating from basic training, Amos was assigned to the Port Loma Naval Base supporting Naval operations.

1958-1960: Reports to the Naval Training Center in San Diego for communications training. Here he learns domestic and international morse code, radio procedures, etc. Upon completion of his training, he is assigned to the USS Bradford as a communication/radiomen.

1960-1962: In 1960, Amos was ordered to NTC, Bainbridge, Maryland where he underwent Radio B technical training. This was a 9-month training course. After his Radio B training, he was ordered to Naval Submarine School in Connecticut, cira 1961. Here he also attended the Advanced Antenna School which lasted 3 months. He was then ordered to Hawaii where he served as Radiomen aboard the submarine, USS Swordfish. During his time aboard the Swordfish, they were ordered to the Mare Island Naval Shipyard in Vallejo, California where the Swordfish underwent maintenance to replace her nuclear reactors. During this time, Amos provided fire control support as well as other duties.

1962-1970: In 1962, Amos was received orders to Yokosuka, Japan where served as a member of the Naval Beach Group One Westpac Detachment. In 1965, Amos was ordered to serve aboard the USS Winston in communications and later order to Guam to serve aboard the USS Proteus in the same capacity. In 1968 he was ordered to Saigon in support of the Vietnam war. During this time he also deployed to the Philippines. As part of his assignment, he was assigned in support of the Beachmasters and Seabees setting up communications for beach to beach and beach to ships, placing him and unit in direct line of enemy fire during the Vietnam war.

1970-1976: In 1970, Amos began his second and final tour in Yokoksua, Japan with the Naval Communication Station where he, among other things, supported military and non-military communications. Upon his retirement, he remained in Japan until his return home circa 1995. Amos' last trip to Japan was in 1998 in support of IYAF.

== Videos ==
- All Japan Enbu Taikai 1991- Shihonage
