= Kiyoyuki Terada =

Japanese aikidoka

Kiyoyuki Terada (寺田精之, Terada Kiyoyuki, March 20, 1922 – July 13, 2009) was a Japanese aikido teacher. He was ranked 10th dan in Yoshinkan Aikido and served as the most senior instructor in Yoshinkan Aikido until his death.

== Early life ==
Terada was born in Nagasaki, Kyūshū, Japan. His martial arts life began in April 1934 at Kaisei Junior High School where he took up his first martial art of Kendo. At age 15, he received an award for the best Judo player of the year after winning a Judo championship that same year. Upon his entry into Takushoku University at age 18, he began his karate training. It was there that in 1941 he met Gozo Shioda, the future head of the Yoshinkan Aikido dojo. During the period between 1940 and 1943, Terada learned Sumo from Akutsugawa Sensei, Judo from Sone Sensei, and Kashimaryu Jujitsu from Osugi Sensei.

== War Years ==
At age 21 in 1943, Terada joined the Imperial Japanese Army due to the ongoing war. In March 1944 he was ordered to the Japanese Airforce Academy and became an aircraft mechanic. From 1944 to 1945 he worked in aircraft maintenance at Kumamoto Airfield. It was here where he learned that the war had ended and two days later on August 17, he returned home to Nagasaki.

== Post-war to present ==
Terada moved to Tokyo in 1948 and worked for the Miyakoshi Company. In 1950 he went to work for the military police in Yokohama. This same year he joined the Aikikai Honbu dojo. His primary teacher was Kisshomaru Ueshiba and he also took lessons from aikido founder, Morihei Ueshiba.

In 1952, Terada conducted an aikido training seminar for the NKK Company and at 85 different police stations with Gozo Shioda Sensei. In 1955 he conducted aikido training for the Police Department in Yokohama and at the US Army base, Camp Drake in Saitama.

== Yoshinkan Aikido ==
In 1955, Terada Sensei was with Gozo Shioda Sensei, when Kancho sensei founded the Yoshinkan Aikido. In 1957, the Yoshinkan was visited by US Senator Robert F. Kennedy and Prime Minister Nakasone. Terada served as chief instructor of the Yoshinkan honbu until 1961 when he left Tokyo to teach aikido at the US Naval Base in Yokosuka. It was here that his most senior student, Amos Lee Parker began his aikido life.

From 1967 to 2009, Terada made trips around the world to teach aikido. Such destinations include Australia, Russia, England, Canada and the United States.

Terada received his 9th degree black belt from Gozo Shioda Kancho in 1990. At this time he also received the title of Saikō Shihan (Chief or Head Shihan). He served as the president of the National Yoshinkan Renmei and the president of Aikido Yoshinkan Seiseikai. Terada held the title of Yoshinkan Aikido Saikō Komon. (Yoshinkan Aikido Supreme Advisor). It was announced in January 2008 that Terada had been awarded 10th dan by the Yoshinkan Foundation making him the first to receive such an honor by the Yoshinkan.

On Monday, July 13, 2009, Terada died at the age of 87.
