= Takashi Kushida =

Japanese aikidoka (1935–2012)

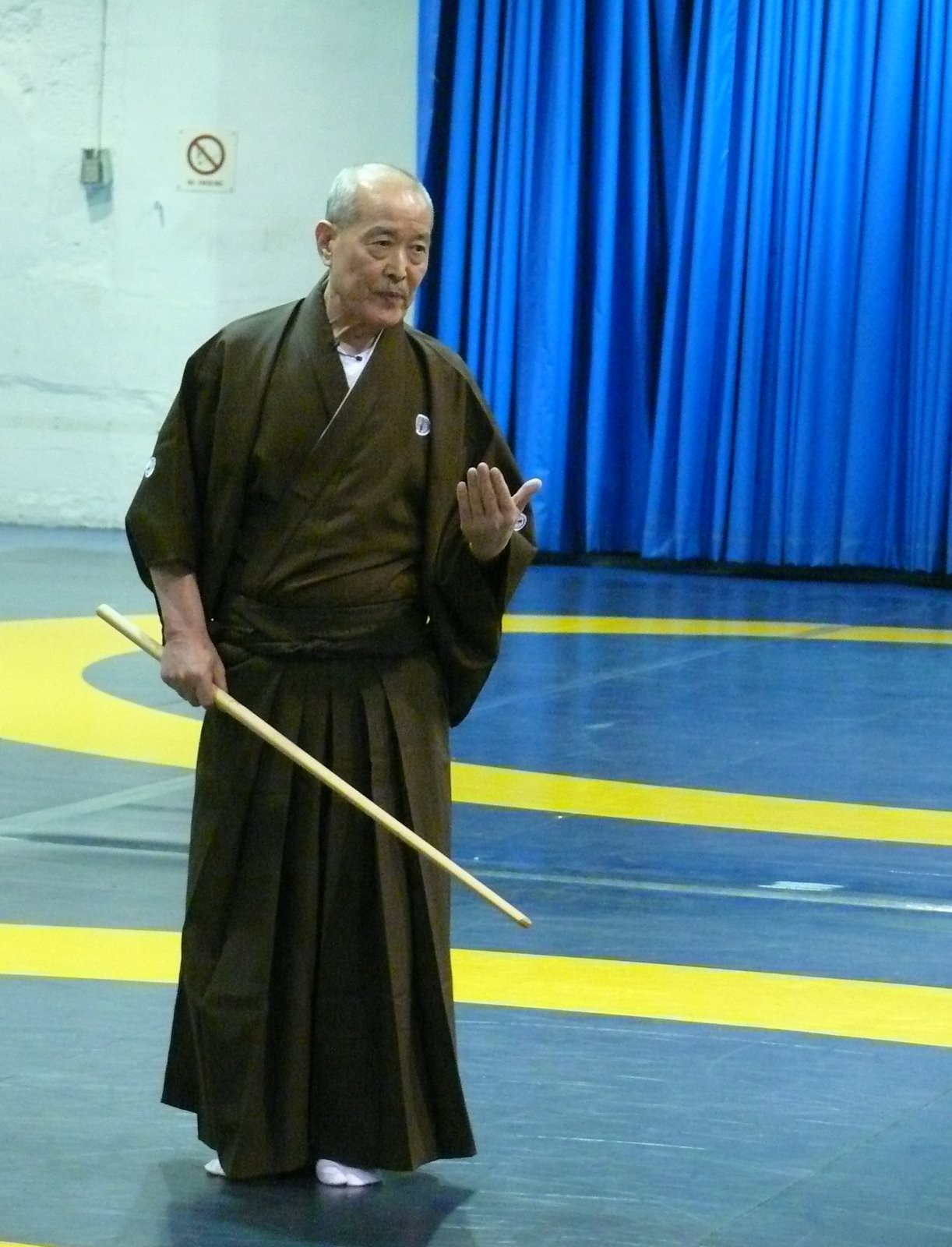
- Takashi Kushida
- Born: May 2, 1935; Japan
- Died: May 10, 2012 (aged 77); Ann Arbor, Michigan, US
- Native name: 串田 誉司 Kushida Takashi
- Nationality: Japanese
- Style: Aikido Yoshokai

Other information
- Children: Akira Kushida; Keiko Kushida Cauley

Takashi Kushida (串田 誉司, Kushida Takashi; May 2, 1935 – May 10, 2012) was a Japanese aikido master and the chief instructor of Aikido Yoshokai Association of North America (also called AYANA). He began his study of Aikido under Gozo Shioda in 1953 and lived at the Yoshinkan Dojo as a professional student (uchideshi) for over 12 years. In 1964 he became a Shihan. He was awarded “Menkyo Kaiden” and 8th Dan in 1982 by Gozo Shioda. While at the Yoshinkan Dojo, Kushida handled many of Shioda's affairs and taught many of the Yoshinkan instructors in place today. Following this period of intense training and instruction, Kushida was made Senior Assistant Instructor at the Yoshinkan. Between 1963 and 1973 he served as Aikido teacher to the Japanese Air Force, the Tokyo Riot Control Police, and National Railway Police. He also accompanied Shioda in demonstrations in New Zealand and Hawaii as well as teaching at various universities, private companies, and at the Yoshinkan. During his early years as an uchi-deshi, he was instrumental in developing the Yoshinkan's current pedagogical system along with Kyoichi Inoue in consultation with Gozo Shioda.

== Move to the US and establishment of Yoshokai ==
Kushida left Japan in 1973 after a request was made for an instructor in the Detroit area. Yoshinkan Aikido received a significant boost with Kushida's arrival. He settled in Michigan and established a network of more than 50 Dojos in North America. In 1976 Kushida founded the Aikido Yoshinkai Association of North America.

In 1991, Yoshinkai Aikido in Japan established a group called the International Yoshinkai Aikido Federation (IYAF). Their representatives discussed the mission, policies, and activities of IYAF with Kushida. However, Kushida did not wish to change AYANA's standards to conform with those of the IYAF. In 1991, Kushida-Sensei established his own school of Aikido, adopting the name "Aikido Yoshokai."

Kushida assisted by his son Akira Kushida, taught classes at the Genyokan Dojo, AYANA's headquarters facility, located near his home in Ann Arbor, Michigan. At the Genyokan, Kushida also conducted formal classes in Genbu Sotojutsu, a 200-year-old sword method once taught only to members of the Kushida family in Japan.

== Sources ==
- Black Belt Magazine, November 1982, Aikido Yoshinkai: Power and Harmony
- Aikido Journal
- The official Yoshokai aikido web site.
