= Nishioka Tsuneo =

Japanese martial artist (1924–2014)

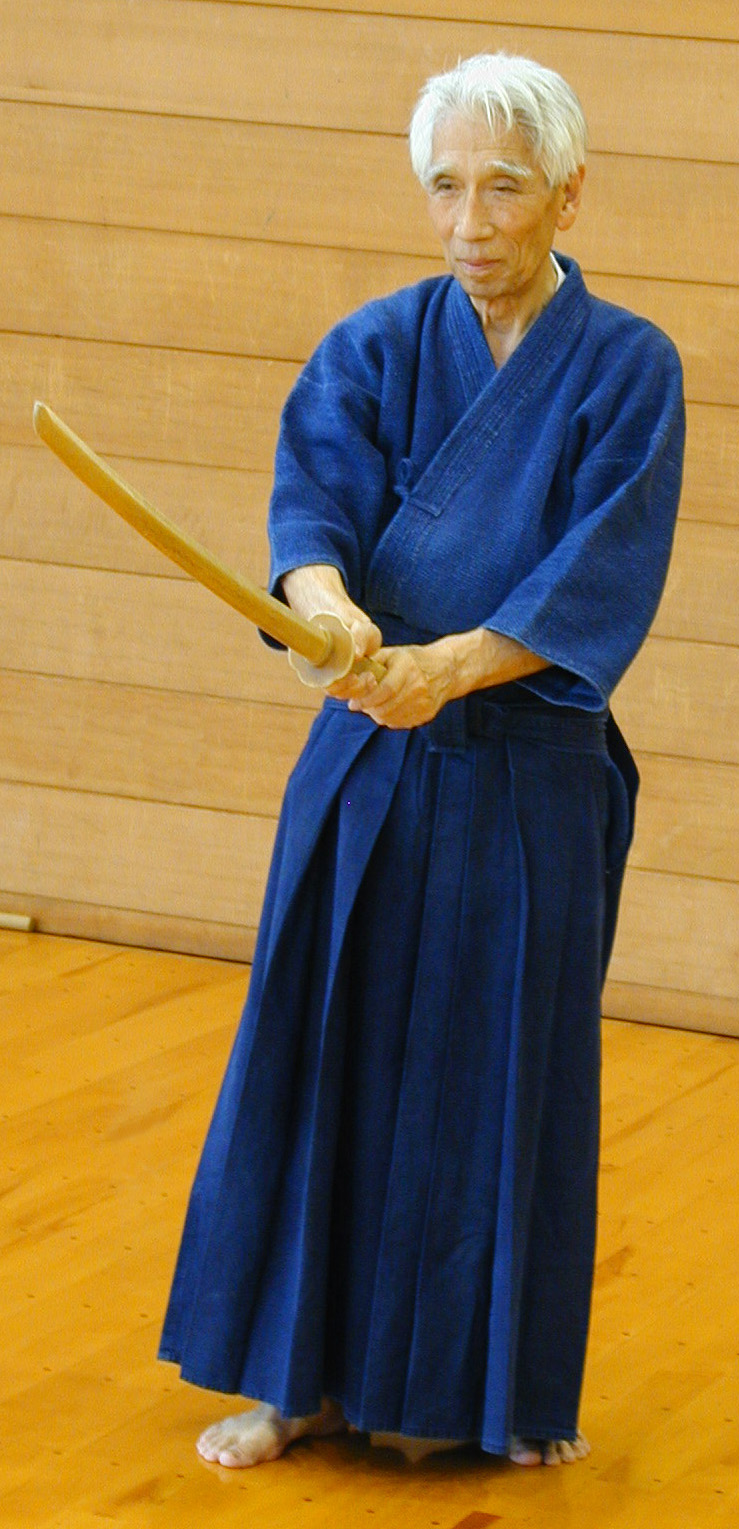
Nishioka Tsuneo

Nishioka Tsuneo (西岡常夫) (7 February 1924 – 8 February 2014) - was a Japanese martial artist and the founder of the Shinto Muso-ryu Jōdō group Sei Ryu Kai (清隆会). As of 2012, Nishioka had retired from active teaching although several of his menkyo kaiden continue to transmit his teachings.

Nishioka Tsuneo started his training in Shinto Muso Ryu (神道夢想流) under Shimizu Takaji (清水隆次) in 1938 at the age of 14. Nishioka studied constantly with Shimizu Takaji until Shimizu’s death in 1978. Nishioka received his first scroll of transmission (Oku-iri) in 1941, the second (Shomokuroku) in 1943 and (Gomokuroku) in 1966. In 1975 Nishioka received his Menkyo Kaiden or "license of full transmission" from Shimizu Takaji.

During the above timeline Nishioka started teaching and training with the Zen Nihon Kendo Renmei (ZenKenRen) but has ceased to be involved with them and has only returned to teach occasionally.

Nishioka created the Sei Ryu Kai in honor of Shimizu Takaji after his death by using the kanji found in his name to form Sei (or Shi) 清；Ryu 隆 –and Kai 会, which could be interpreted as "Shimizu Takaji’s" group.

Within Sei Ryu Kai, only Menkyo Kaiden issued by Nishioka Sensei are able to officially represent the ryu and authorized to transmit and teach as independent "licensed teachers".

Lower levels of recognition (such as Shomokuroku (literal trans - Beginning Catalog) and Gomokuroku (Afterwards Catalog)) are considered "Assistants" to an active Menkyo Kaiden or Shihan.

According to Nishioka Sensei, a Mokuroku is not a qualification and is an expression of the will of the predecessors to convey "their hopes for the future", and it is still in the middle of the path.

== Sei Ryu Kai Menkyo Kaiden of Nishioka Sensei ==
- Mitsuo Hamaji
- Michio Kaneda
- Kazuhiko Ishiko
- Toshimoto Tamiya
- Phillip Relnick
- Pascal Krieger
- Hiroaki Ishida
- Katsuhiko Arai
- Taisuke Watanabe
- Hiroshi Yamada
- Masami Kitta.

N.B. Listed in chronological order in line with Japanese etiquette and sourced from Nishioka Sensei's own "My Wish" for his successors, dated 12 September 2010.
