= Keijutsukai =

Japanese independent aikido federation

Keijutsukai Aikido (警術会合気道) is a martial arts system taught by the Keijutsukai Kokusai Renmei (Keijutsukai International Federation), an independent aikido federation based in Tokyo, Japan. It was founded by Thomas H. Makiyama in February 1980. In 1999, Keijutsukai Aikido was approved by Temple University Japan for inclusion under the curriculum of the Continuing Education Program.

== Style ==
Keijutsukai Aikido and Keijutsu (a specialized method of defensive tactics for law enforcement personnel), emphasize rational and practical approaches, incorporating the Principle of Compatibility; Circular (marui) and Proper Operational Distance (maai). Movements and techniques are taught to flow naturally without force.

Maai (Proper Distance) and Marui (Circle) concepts are shared with other Aikido styles. To develop coordination and balance; to control movements with the hips, while maintaining a stabilized center of gravity at the lower half of the body are also important and fundamental concepts.

The techniques consist in throws, locks, and the application of nerve pressure points designed to constantly keep an opponent off-balance and under control.

== Statement of purpose ==
The Keijutsukai states to be "A Totally Independent AIKIDO Fraternity Devoted To International Friendship And Understanding Through The Medium Of Budō".

== Sources ==
- Frank Paetzold, Wu Shu, Books on Demand GmbH (2003), p 151, ISBN 978-3-8330-0182-6
- Thomas H Makiyama, The techniques of aikido, Jenkins (1963), ASIN: B0000CLSPM
- Thomas H Makiyama, Keijutsukai Aikido: Japanese Art of Self-defense, Ohara Publications Inc., U.S. (1998), ISBN 978-0-89750-092-0
