= Tsuneo Ando =

9th dan Yoshinkan Aikido master

Tsuneo Ando is an 9th dan Yoshinkan Aikido teacher. He spent 13 years as uchi deshi to Gozo Shioda, the founder of Yoshinkan Aikido. He is said to closely resemble Shioda in terms of size; speed and style. Tsuneo Ando was born in 1956 in Nihama City, Ehime Prefecture on the island of Shikoku. He attended Tokushima University where he studied engineering. Ando joined the Tokushima University Aikido Club where he reached the rank of 2nd dan in aikikai. After graduating from university Ando was briefly employed by a chemical company. In 1981, he joined the Yoshinkan as uchi deshi. He was awarded the title of shihan (Master) in 1993 and he currently holds the rank of 9th dan in Yoshinkan Aikido. He also holds the title of shuseki shihan (主席師範, chairman shihan) at the Yoshinkan Aikido Headquarters in Tokyo.

== Publications ==
Ando has produced several DVDs for aikido training.

- Aikido for Beginners DVD
- 合気道達人列伝 安藤毎夫 DVD 2000. ISBN 4-87389-646-0
- Aikido no Akashi DVD
- Aikido Tatsujin Retsuden DVD
- Dekiru Aikido DVD
- Ukemi DVD
- The Special Series Volume 1; Volume 2 and Volume 3.
- Buki waza DVD
- Aiki Jo DVD
- A range of DVDs designed for test preparation and covering the Yoshinkan Aikido test syllabus from kids beginners all the way up to yudan.
- Instructors Test Syllabus DVD

He has also published two books Chushin Ryoku no Jidai ('The Age of Center Power') and Aikido no Kai ('Aikido Answers'). Chushin Ryoku no Jidai is available in Japanese (published by BAB Japan) and in German (published by Bill Verlag). Aikido no Kai is currently only available in Japanese.

== Personal life ==
Ando lives in Chiba Prefecture with his wife, South African Stephanie Ando (5th dan), and their two sons. He has two children from his first marriage to Naomi Ando, also a student of Gozo Shioda, who died in 1997.
