= Micromastery =

2017 book by Robert Twigger

- Author: Robert Twigger
- Language: English
- Genre: Self-help
- Publisher: Penguin Life
- Publication date: 25 May 2017
- Media type: Print (Hardback) and E-book
- Pages: 256
- ISBN: 978-0-241-28004-1
- Website: www.roberttwigger.com

Micromastery: Learn Small, Learn Fast and Find the Hidden Path to Happiness is a self-help book by British author, Robert Twigger, first published in 2017 by Penguin Life and in E-book format.

According to the author, micromastery is the practice of developing expertise and learning many small skills instead of aiming to become an expert in one area. Such skills may, for example, be producing decorative drawings, improving one's handwriting, making a perfect omelette, or growing a Bonsai tree.

== Media coverage ==
- Twigger, Robert (22 May 2017). "Micromastery: A hidden path to happiness?". Today. BBC Radio 4. An interview with John Humphrys.

== See also ==
- Polymath
