= The Compass Institute Inc =

Australian special education organisation

The Compass Institute Inc.
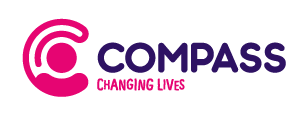
- The Compass Institute
- Founder: David Dangerfield
- Purpose: Further education and training for young people with disabilities
- Location: Sunshine Coast, Queensland, Australia
- Region served: Sunshine Coast, Queensland, Australia
- Services: Disability service
- Formerly called: The Aikido Institute

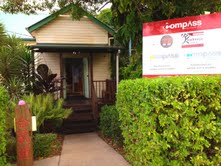
The entrance to the Dojo and The Compass Institute's Palmwoods centre

The Compass Institute is a special education organisation based in Queensland, Australia.

Commencing in 1991 the organisation provided Alternative Education programmes to youth at risk in local secondary and primary schools with over 7,000 school students benefiting from an evergrowing range of specialist programmes. The Compass Education & Training Service commenced in 2003 with 3 trainees and one staff member. The service now supports over 200 trainees through 80 staff across five centres and 12 social enterprises – micro businesses that include the 20-acre Compass Farm, Connections Cafe, Harvest Kitchen, The Garden Cafe, Rakes and Panes and Earth & Wood.

In 2016 Compass commenced its Assistance Dogs Programme, purchasing and training pups to support children with autism and/or intellectual disabilities. The programme engages with corporate sponsors who support the costs of raising and training a pup for 2 years (approximately $25,000) and in return have naming rights for the pup along with significant co-branded media and promotional opportunities across the working life of the dog – up to ten years. This support allows Compass to essentially gift the dog to the child in need. The programme has now been launched nationally.

== Education ==
The Compass Institute Inc. provides further education in a broad range of subjects. The goal of the institute is to provide real life skills with a focus on personal development and independent living. This includes literacy, numeracy, communication, fitness, social skills, food preparation, personal grooming, transport and community participation.

Compass employs staff in roles such as teachers, trainers, coaches and mentors, similarly those that attend Compass are students or 'Trainees' and not referred to as 'clients'.

== Training and vocation ==
The organisation works on making pathways for disabled young people to become increasingly independent. Central to Compass training and vocation units is the provision of "real further education, skills-based training and vocational opportunities as part of a structured pathway to social and economic participation". Through the vocational pathways Compass provides, people with a disability have successfully been placed into appropriate and rewarding work. The Compass Institute Inc. is involved in setting up social enterprises as vocational pathways for its trainees. These are 'real life' businesses that are integrated into the local community, including lawn and garden maintenance, Vehicle detailing, business support services, art and craft markets and the Compass Farm.

The purchase of an 8 hectare property enabled the organisation to set up an innovative educational and vocational setting, known as the Compass Farm. At this facility trainees can undertake vocational training, work experience and therapy. In 2011, 20 people with disabilities, ranging in ages from 20 to 30 undertook training and work programs at the property. Activities range from animal husbandry, mixed horticulture, nursery work and property maintenance work.

== Martial values ==
Underpinning the structure and organisation of both the service provision and management of Compass are the philosophies of Japanese Budo. The early work of the Aikido Institute (now The Compass Institute Inc.) involved running intervention programs and life skills classes that used Aikido and Budō to help students with goal setting, anger management, time management, and self-defence. These "unique experiential programs" employed the principles of traditional martial arts philosophy and practice to engage students. From here Compass branched out into the disability service, but the role of Aikido and budo philosophy has never ceased to have an important role in the running of Compass.

Compass CEO David Dangerfield has been using martial arts to help build physical skills and self-confidence in people for over 30 years. He saw the potential to do the same with people with both physical or intellectual disabilities. "These individuals are always reminded of what they can't do, Martial arts is something they can do. It's a great physical outlet..."
