= Yoshokai =

The Aikido Yoshokai Association of North America (合氣道耀尚會; abbreviated as AYANA) is an American aikido organization founded in 1991 by former Yoshinkan-affiliated master Takashi Kushida. Its hombu dojo is the Genyokan (玄耀館) in Ann Arbor, Michigan.

== Style ==
Yoshokai Aikido is a "hard" style of aikido by common parlance, and very similar to Yoshinkan. Full tenkan movements are present, but partial pivots and more conservative blending motions are perhaps more usual. Atemi is common. Yoshokai ukemi is also distinct (similar to Yoshinkan ukemi), with more slapping of the spare hand/foot, and a more forward-feeling 'high fall' (called 'jumping breakfall' or 'hiyaku ukemi') than the other sideways motions employed in different aikido styles. A special emphasis is placed on aikido as a form of conflict resolution and a cooperative study of making harmony between two people. Like Yoshinkan Aikido, Daito-ryu aiki-jujutsu names for basic techniques are retained (e.g. "ikkajō" rather than "ikkyō")

Yoshokai Aikido is organized in a rather centralized fashion relative to other styles, with technique lists and explanations distributed annually. This goes hand in hand with its emphasis on meticulous attention to detail.

Yoshokai Aikido closely links techniques, basic movements, and weapons techniques. Weapons techniques (buki-waza) are prominent in the curriculum, mostly with bokken, jō, and tantō.
