= Tsutomu Chida =

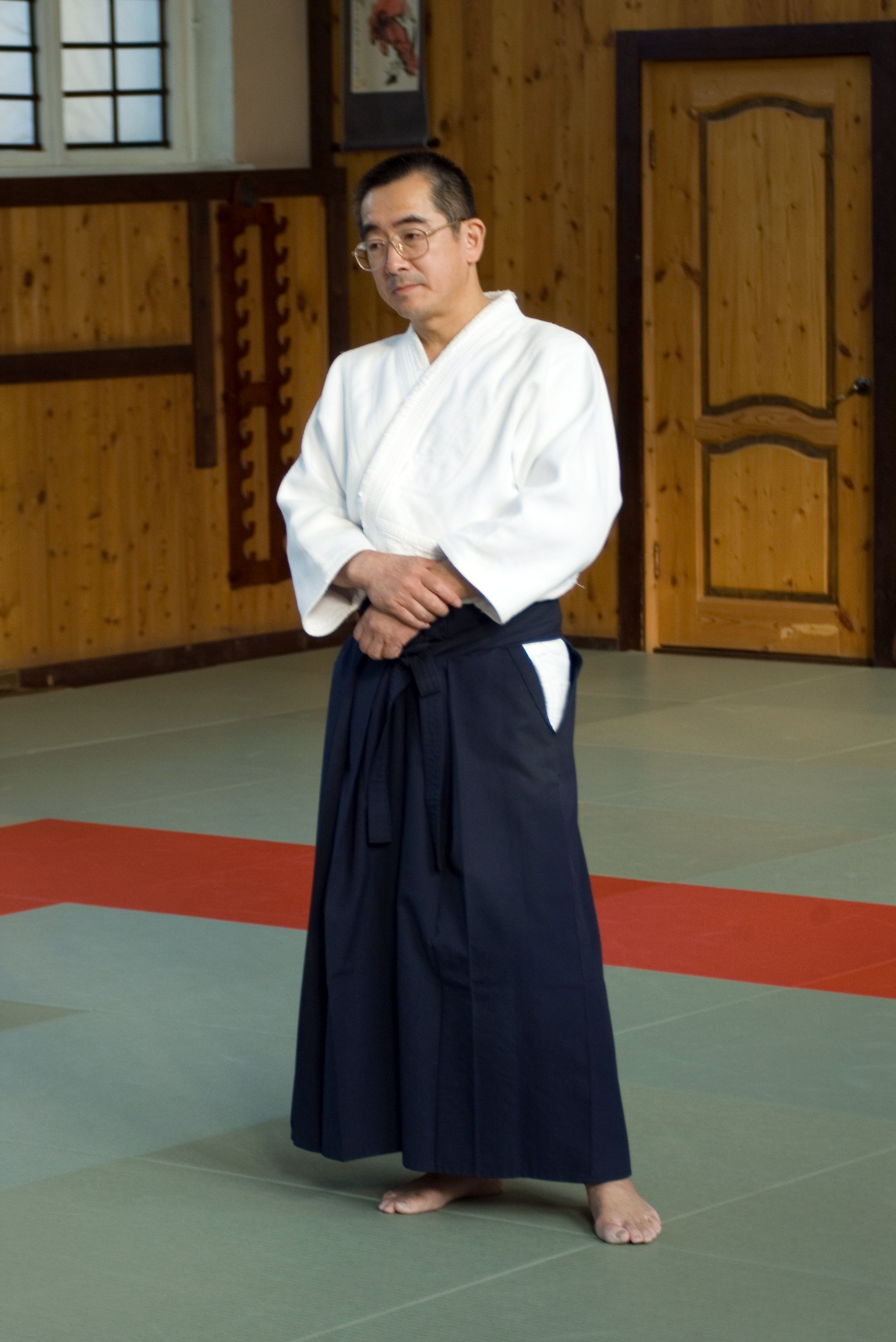
Tsutomu Chida at Renshinkai Aikido seminar in Moscow, in October 2008

Tsutomu Chida (千田 務, Chida Tsutomu, born 4 October 1950 in Tokyo) was previously one of the highest ranking shihan of Yoshinkan aikido, at 8th dan, and dojocho of its hombu dojo from 2002. He first became a part of Yoshinkan in 1969 but split from the organization in January 2008 following the resignation of kanchou Kyoichi Inoue. Chida was an uchideshi of Yoshinkan founder Gozo Shioda for 23 years—the longest term among Shioda's uchideshi-- and directed the senshusei course. He is "a living legend of Yoshinkan aikido" and current "highest shihan" (最高師範) of his Yoshinkan offshoot school, Aikido Renshinkai (合気道錬身会).
