= Nakasone =

Nakasone is a Japanese surname. Notable people with the surname include:

- Hirofumi Nakasone (born 1945), former Japanese Minister of Foreign Affairs, son of Yasuhiro Nakasone
- Keith Nakasone (born 1956), American competitive judoka
- Michael Nakasone, American band director
- Paul Miki Nakasone (born 1963), former Commander of the United States Cyber Command, Director of the National Security Agency, and Chief of the Central Security Service
- Rino Nakasone (born 1979), Japanese dancer and choreographer
- Nakasone Toyomiya, Aji of the Miyako Islands
- Yasuhiro Nakasone (1918–2019), 71st to 73rd Prime Minister of Japan
