= Kyoichi Inoue =

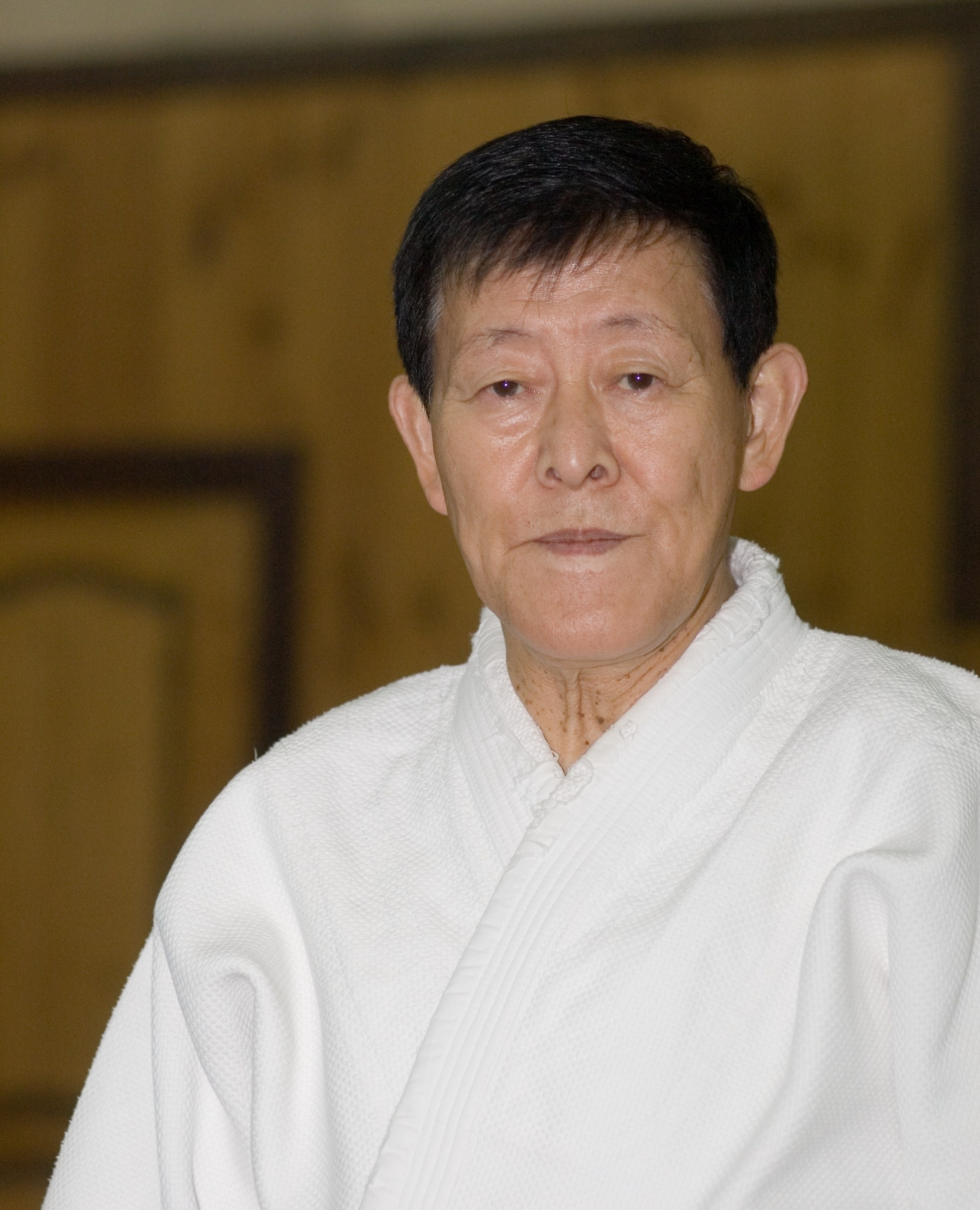
- Kyoichi Inoue
- Born: September 10, 1935; Teshio District, Hokkaido, Japan
- Native name: 井上強一 Inoue Kyoichi
- Nationality: Japanese
- Style: Aikido
- Teacher: Gozo Shioda

Kyoichi Inoue (井上 強一, Inoue Kyōichi; September 10, 1935 – December 23, 2017) was a 10th dan Yoshinkan aikido master. He was an uchideshi under Yoshinkan founder Gozo Shioda, in what became the Yoshinkan senshusei course. During his early years as an uchi-deshi, he was instrumental in developing the Yoshinkan's current pedagogical system along with Takashi Kushida in consultation with Gozo Shioda.

From 1970 to 1996, he was employed as a martial arts instructor for the Tokyo Metropolitan Police after a decade of teaching the riot police. He received his 9th dan from Shioda Gozo in 1992. Shioda died in 1994 and Inoue was named the new director (kanchō 館長) of the Yoshinkan in 2002. His 10th dan certificate was issued by the International Budo Federation in April 2009, as he had resigned from the Yoshinkan effective 30 March 2006 following an internal dispute. He was kanchō of Aikido Shinwakan (合氣道親和館), which he established in 2010. Aikido Shinwakan disbanded on 2014-04-30.

== Publications ==
- 合気道 「抜き」と「呼吸力」の極意―相手を無力化する神秘の科学. Budo-Ra Books: 2009. ISBN 978-4-8094-0807-6.
- 塩田剛三直伝 合気道 呼吸力の鍛錬. ベースボールマガジン社: 2004. ISBN 978-4-583-03769-1.
- 養神館 合気道基本技術教本. 合気ニュース: 1999. ISBN 978-4-900586-55-0.
- 養神館 合気道基本技術教本(下巻). 合気ニュース: 2003. ISBN 978-4-900586-78-9.
