= Robert Twigger =

British artist and writer (born 1962)

- Born: 30 October 1962 (age 63); Solihull
- Occupation: Author
- Children: 2
- Writing career
- Subjects: Travel, exploration, adventure, cross-cultural studies
- Website: www.roberttwigger.com

Robert Twigger (born 30 October 1962) is a British author. He travels widely but divides his time mostly between the UK and Egypt.

== Life ==
Robert Twigger educated at Balliol College, Oxford University. He initially studied engineering, but after six weeks switched to politics and philosophy. He won the Newdigate Prize for poetry. He also staged a film festival for student films, as well as directing two films himself.

Following university, he worked in the publicity department of a record company and taught English and studied martial arts in Japan for three years. After that he travelled widely in remote places for a number of years. He stood, as an experiment in participatory politics, for the Extinction Club party in the 2001 general election in the Oxford West and Abingdon constituency, receiving 93 votes.

Robert Twigger has written 15 award winning fiction and non-fiction books, which have been translated into 16 languages. He has also written articles for newspapers and magazines including The Daily Telegraph, The Sunday Times, Lonely Planet magazine, Maxim, the Financial Times and Esquire. He is a winner of the William Hill Sportsbook of the Year award and the Somerset Maugham award and in 2007 his book Angry White Pyjamas was voted by Waterstone's staff as the best sportsbook of the last 25 years.

== Works ==
- Angry White Pyjamas: An Oxford Poet Trains with the Tokyo Riot Police (1998), a book recounting Twigger's experiences learning aikido in Japan, won both the Somerset Maugham Award for literature and the William Hill Sports Book of the Year award. It was also voted best sports book of the past 25 years by Waterstone's booksellers in 2007.
- Big Snake: The Hunt for the World's Longest Python (1999) describes Twigger's failed attempt to capture a record-breaking 30-foot snake for a $50,000 prize being offered by a New York zoo. In the documentary, Twigger is criticised by his translator for employing indigenous people to do the majority of the work whilst omitting to inform many of them about the $50,000 prize he was seeking for himself.
- The Extinction Club (2001) is an account of Twigger's research into the milu, a species of deer which was thought to have become extinct.
- Being a Man (in the lousy modern world) (2002) describes Twigger's thoughts and observations on the nature of masculinity and its current state at the beginning of the 21st century.
- Voyageur – Across the Rocky Mountains in a Birchbark Canoe (2006) recounts the story of Twigger's three-year, two thousand-mile journey across North West Canada in the wake of eighteenth-century explorer and fur trader Alexander Mackenzie.
- Lost Oasis: A Desert Adventure: In Search Of Paradise (2007) is a desert adventure modelled on explorers such as Theodore Almasy (the inspiration for The English Patient).
- Real Men Eat Puffer Fish (2008) contains humorous advice for men.
- Dr Ragab's Universal Language (2009) is a novel set in 1920s Cairo and Germany.
- Walk (2012)
- Zenslacker (2012)
- Red Nile: A Biography of the World's Greatest River (2013).
- The Modern Explorers Ed. (2013)
- White-Mountain (2016)
- Lonely Planet Travel Anthology contrib. (2016)
- Micromastery (2017)
- Walking the Great North Line Weidenfeld and Nicolson (2020)

Twigger has also published several poetry collections, including one in 2003 with Nobel Prize winner Doris Lessing.

Twigger currently writes and draws a quarterly comic called This Simple Life featuring memoir based material.

== Expeditions ==
In 1997 Twigger's expedition to North Borneo and Kalimantan discovered a line of menhirs across a vast stretch of jungle never before recorded.

Twigger's failed attempt to capture a record-breaking snake in Indonesia in 1997 was the subject of a Channel 4 documentary, entitled Big Snake along with Twigger's book on the expedition.

In 2004 Twigger led an expedition that completed a three-season, two-thousand-mile journey across North West Canada in the wake of eighteenth-century explorer and fur trader Alexander Mackenzie. The team were the first to successfully complete this route in a birchbark canoe since 1793. Of all those who took part only Twigger completed the whole route.

In 2005 Twigger and Steve Mann made the first exploration of the Western Desert using a hand hauled wheeled trolley during which they discovered the tracks of László Almásy's baby Ford expedition of the 1930s.

Since 2006 Twigger has made regular desert journeys with the expedition group "The Explorer School". In 2009–2010 he became the first person to walk the entire 700 km of the Egyptian Great Sand Sea, following the route of German explorer Gerhard Rolhfs across the Egyptian Sahara.

Preceded by Simon Hughes	William Hill Sports Book of the Year winner 1998	Succeeded by Derek Birley
