= Yoshinkan =

Style of aikido

Yoshinkan Aikido
- Yoshinkan eagle logo
- Also known as: Aikido Yoshinkai Foundation (AYF), Yoshinkai, International Yoshinkan Aikido Federation (IYAF)
- Date founded: 1955
- Country of origin: Japan
- Founder: Gozo Shioda (塩田 剛三, Shioda Gōzō, 9 September 1915–17 July 1994)
- Arts taught: Aikido
- Ancestor arts: Daitō-ryū Aiki-jūjutsu, Aiki Budō
- Descendant schools: Yoshokai, Renshinkai, Shudokan, Shinwakan, Shoot Aikido
- Practitioners: Kiyoyuki Terada, Kyoichi Inoue, Tsutomu Chida, Tsuneo Ando, Amos Lee Parker, Jacques Payet, Joe Thambu, Robert Mustard
- Official website: www.Yoshinkan.net

Yoshinkan (養神館 Yōshinkan lit. "Hall of Spirit Cultivation") Aikido is a style of aikido that developed after World War II in the Yoshinkan Dojo of Gozo Shioda (1915–1994). Yoshinkan Aikido is often called the "hard" style of aikido because the training methods are a product of Shioda's grueling life before the war. Shioda named his dojo "Yoshinkan" after a dojo of the same name that was built by his father, a physician, who wanted to improve both physical and spiritual health. The Yoshinkan style is currently the second largest aikido organization worldwide.

== Style ==
As a style of aikido, Yoshinkan is more akin to the pre-war aikibudo techniques taught by Morihei Ueshiba, and therefore also generally closer to aikijujutsu than those styles of aikido developed after the war. The unusual emphasis placed on correct form prior to practicing correct flow and timing further contributes to its image as a "hard" style.

Gozo Shioda created a structured method in which beginning students would learn the foundation techniques. Techniques are performed by a pair of students called uke (受け, the partner on whom the technique is performed) and shite (仕手, the partner who performs the technique). They are categorized by elements such as the initiating attack, the applicable control and whether it is a pin or throw. They are further divided into two groups called ichi (first) and ni (second) techniques. Ichi techniques have a feeling of the energy moving towards uke, while ni techniques have a feeling of energy moving towards shite. For example, in an ichi technique, shite would move in the same direction as a pull by uke, while in a ni technique, shite would divert or pivot away from a push by uke.

The current method of breaking the techniques into steps and the kihon dosa were developed in order to facilitate teaching beginners in a group. The kenshusei codified many of these methods in consultation with Gozo Shioda, especially Kyoichi Inoue and Takashi Kushida.

To remove stiffness from techniques taught in this way, practitioners over the rank of shodan also practice timing and flow.

== Techniques ==
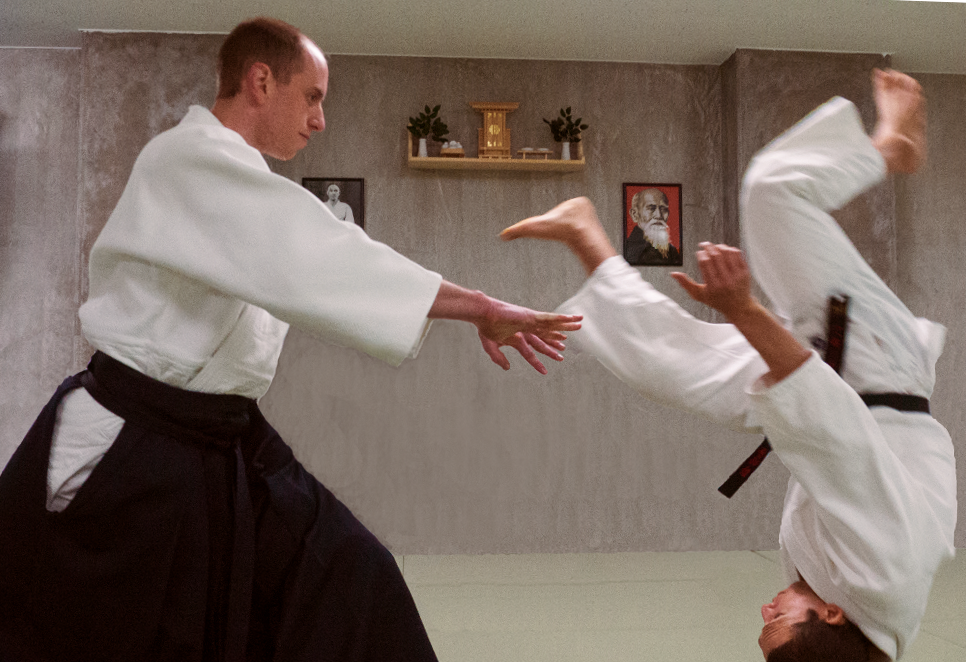
kokyunage performed by Yoshinkan practitioners (Chris Crampton)

Yoshinkan Aikido has some 150 kihon waza (lit. "basic techniques"), which are practised repeatedly and designed to teach principles of movement, balance, timing, etc. In addition to set techniques, the style includes kokyunage (lit. "breath throws"), or techniques in which uke attacks and shite makes a non-mandatory, short and decisive response. As students progress, they begin to practice jiyu waza (lit. free techniques), which is a time-limited free-form attack and defense. In higher grades, jiyu-waza is performed against multiple attackers and/or attackers with weapons. Yoshinkan students do not normally practice the randori free-form found in other styles of aikido.

The syllabus contains a few weapons forms, although they are rarely practised outside the hombu dojo, where they are taught to senshusei students. Jiyu-waza for yudansha includes free-form techniques against sword and knife, and some Yoshinkan dojos teach knife take-away techniques. Some Yoshinkan dojos offer aiki-ken classes (classes in which aikido principles are investigated through sword practice) and some offer non-aikido weapons training, such as iaido, concurrently with aikido classes.

Like many styles of aikido, Yoshinkan eschews competition; instead, it emphasizes self-defence applications. Yoshinkan aikido is one of the martial arts that has been taught to the Tokyo police.

Besides the usual attention to distance, timing and balance, the Yoshinkan style places particularly heavy emphasis on stance and basic movements. Yoshinkan’s distinctive stance, or kamae (lit. "posture" in Japanese), stresses the position of feet and hips. Yoshinkan aikido practitioners stand with hips and shoulders square to the front, the front foot pointing outward and the back foot pointing about 90 degrees to the front foot. Kamae is the foundation of all Yoshinkan aikido techniques and practitioners of Yoshinkan aikido strive to perfect their kamae so that their overall technique will be strengthened. Along with kamae there are 6 kihon dosa (lit. "basic movements") which are considered to be central for the 150 basic techniques. Yoshinkan aikido students practice these diligently to understand how to move their kamae around to put themselves in a strong position. Without proper form in one's basic movements one's aikido will not be as effective.

== Senshusei course ==
In 1990, Gozo Shioda founded the International Yoshinkan Aikido Federation (IYAF) to facilitate the learning of Yoshinkan aikido outside Japan. Under current dojo director Susumu Chino, the Yoshinkan hombu dojo, located in Shinjuku Tokyo, runs an annual 11-month intensive course called the Senshusei course, in which students from Japan and foreign nations train with the Tokyo Metropolitan Riot Police. The book Angry White Pyjamas by Robert Twigger is based on the author's experiences during the course.

In addition to the Senshusei Course, a number of other Uchi-deshi and specialized training programs have arisen in recent years. For example, Shihan Tsuneo Ando offers live-in training near Tokyo, and Shihan Jacques Payet offers an 11-month training course at Mugenjuku dojo in Kyoto.

== Former Yoshinkan Branches ==
Yoshokai aikido is an offshoot of Yoshinkan Aikido based in the United States founded by Takashi Kushida, a direct student of Gozo Shioda and a contemporary of Kyoichi Inoue.

Then-9th dan Kyoichi Inoue, shihan, resigned from the Yoshinkan in March 2006 following an internal dispute, later establishing his own branch, Aikido Shinwakan (合氣道親和館). Following Inoue-shihan's departure, Tsutomu Chida, 8th dan and then-dojocho of Yoshinkan hombu dojo, also broke away, establishing Aikido Renshinkai (合気道錬身会) in 2008.
