= Gozo Shioda =

Japanese aikido master (1915–1994)

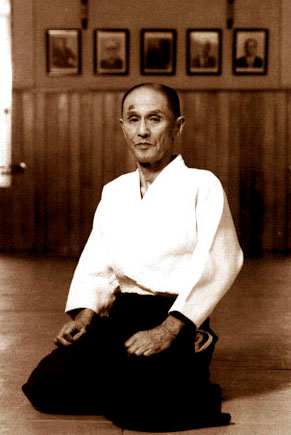
- Born: September 9, 1915; Shinjuku, Tokyo, Japan
- Died: July 17, 1994 (aged 78); Japan
- Style: Yoshinkan Aikido
- Teacher: Morihei Ueshiba
- Rank: 9th dan Aikikai, 10. dan aikido IMAF

Other information
- Children: Tetsutaro Shioda, Yasuhisa Shioda
- Notable students: Kiyoyuki Terada, Takashi Kushida, Kyoichi Inoue, Thomas Makiyama, Tsutomu Chida, Tsuneo Ando, Jacques Payet, Yasuhisa Shioda, Robert Mustard
- Website: http://www.yoshinkan.net/

Gozo Shioda (塩田 剛三, Shioda Gōzō; September 9, 1915 – July 17, 1994) was a Japanese master of aikido who founded the Yoshinkan style of aikido. He was one of aikido founder Morihei Ueshiba's most senior students. Shioda held the rank of 9th dan Aikikai and 10th dan of IMAF aikido.

== Early life ==
Shioda was born on September 9, 1915, in Shinjuku, Tokyo. His father was Seiichi Shioda, a physician who also taught judo and kendo. Shioda was a weak child, and reportedly credited his survival to his father's pediatric skills. While still at school, Shioda trained in judo, attaining the rank of 3rd dan before completing secondary school. He also trained in kendo during his youth.

== Aikido career ==
Shioda began training under the founder of aikido, Morihei Ueshiba, in 1932. His training as an uchi-deshi (live-in student) under Ueshiba continued for eight years. Shioda was a small man, standing at around 5' 1" to 5' 2" (155–157 cm) and weighing around 102 lb. to 108 lb. (46–49 kg).

Shioda graduated from Takushoku University, where he went to class with Judo master Masahiko Kimura and Kyokushin Karate founder Mas Oyama, in 1941, and was posted to administrative positions in China, Taiwan, and Borneo during World War II. In one incident in China, he was drinking in a bar with an army friend in Shanghai when the friend got into an argument with a local gang member. Three of his fellow gang members came to his assistance. Shioda and his friend were cornered by the gang. In the ensuing fight, Shioda broke the leg of one of the gang members, the arm of another, and stopped another by punching him in the stomach, all using his aikido skills. Shioda later described this incident as his 'aikido enlightenment' and wrote that one could only truly appreciate what aikido was about once one had used it in a life-or-death situation.

Shioda returned to Japan in 1946 and spent several months trying to locate his family on Kyushu. He rejoined Ueshiba for a month of intensive training, but was forced to dedicate the next few years to earning a living in post-war Japan. He began teaching aikido in 1950. That year, he taught for the company Nihon Kokan at the Asano Shipyards in Yokohama. In 1954, he entered the All Japan Kobudo demonstration, and won the prize for the most outstanding demonstration. This marked a turning point for the growth of aikido. Shioda's performance attracted sponsorship that enabled him to build an aikido dōjō (training hall).

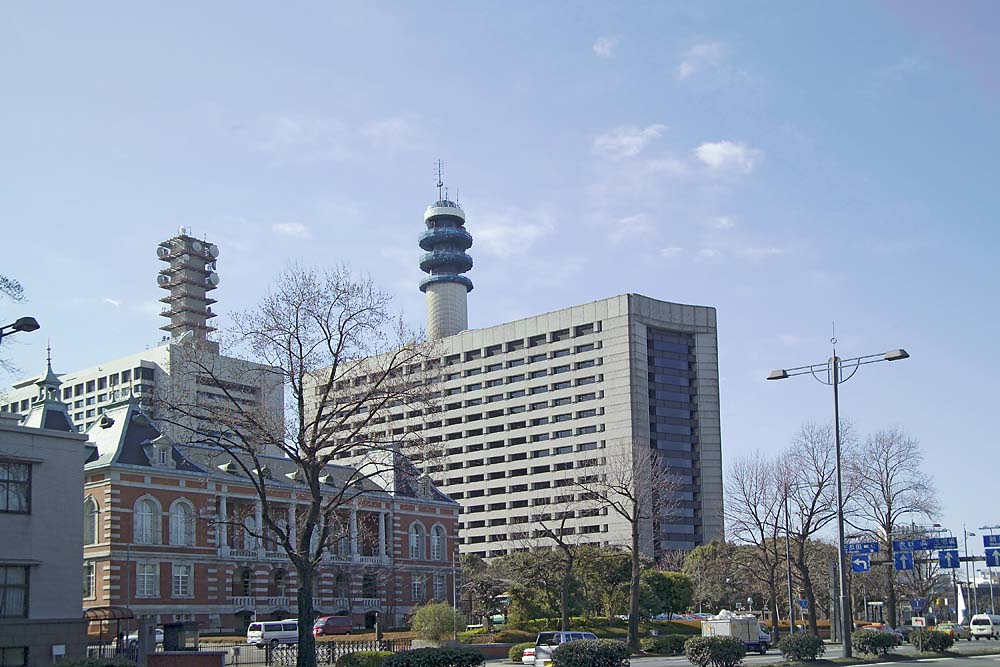
Two years after establishing the Yoshinkan style of aikido, Shioda began a close working association with the Tokyo Metropolitan Police Department

In 1955, Shioda founded the Yoshinkan style of aikido, which emphasizes self-defense applications. The name "Yoshinkan" was the name Shioda's father had used for his own judo dōjō. According to biographer Stanley Pranin, this separation from his master's school has been little understood. Pranin notes that Ueshiba's school independently recovered later on, so that "there never occurred a formal split between the two organizations despite their rather different approaches to aikido. The two groups simply evolved independently while maintaining more or less cordial ties."

In an interview with Andy Adams for Black Belt magazine, Shioda said, "I don't really feel that I broke away from the mainstream of aikido since there was nothing to break away from back then. Ueshiba sensei (the late Morihei Ueshiba, founder of aikido) was farming, his son Kisshomaru was working for some company, and the sensei's aikido dōjō at Iwama in Ibaragi Prefecture was being rented out as a dance hall" (p. 34). Speaking about that same period, Moriteru Ueshiba said, "there was not yet much activity at the Hombu Dojo. For a time my father [Kisshomaru Ueshiba] was actually in Iwama instead ... starting around 1949, he worked for about seven years at a company called Osaka Shoji. He had no other choice. Even if you have a dojo, you can't make a living if nobody is coming to train, which was largely the case after the war. So, he took a job as an ordinary company employee during the day and taught only in the mornings and evenings."

In 1957, Shioda developed the Senshusei course, an intensive aikido training program, for the Tokyo Metropolitan Police Department. In 1961, Ueshiba promoted Shioda to the rank of 9th dan. In 1973, Shioda sent Takashi Kushida, one of his most senior students, to introduce Yoshinkan aikido to the United States of America.

== Later life ==
In 1983, Shioda received the 'Hanshi' rank from the Kokusai Budoin-International Martial Arts Federation (IMAF), followed by the rank of 10th dan from IMAF in 1985. In 1990, together with his son Yasuhisa Shioda, he established the International Yoshinkan Aikido Federation. That same year, he established the international Senshusei program to develop Yoshinkan Aikido instructors across the world.

Shioda died on July 17, 1994. He wrote a few books on his martial art: Dynamic Aikido (1968, published in paperback format in 1977), Total Aikido: The master course (1997, co-authored, published posthumously), and Aikido Shugyo: Harmony in confrontation (2002, published posthumously). Shioda viewed aikido as being "not a sport but a budo. Either you defeat your opponent or he defeats you. You cannot complain that he did not follow the rules. You have to overcome your opponent in a way appropriate to each situation."

== See also ==
- Aikido styles
- Ryusei Sagusa
