= Uchi-deshi =

Japanese term for a live-in student/apprentice

Uchi-deshi (内弟子; lit. 'inside student') is a Japanese term for a live-in student/apprentice who trains under and assists a sensei on a full-time basis. The system exists in kabuki, rakugo, shogi, igo, aikido, sumo, karate and other modern Japanese martial arts.

== Lifestyle ==
Uchi-deshi usually live in the dōjō or the home of the teacher, or in separate accommodations near the dōjō. The deshi serves the teacher all day, every day. Duties may include cleaning and secretarial work. In contrast to uchi-deshi, students who live outside are referred to as soto-deshi (外弟子; lit. "outside students"). Some dojo have uchideshi rooms right in the dojo.

Historically, an uchi-deshi was typically chosen and groomed to become the next head of a school of martial arts when a direct family member was not available. Nowadays, the term is used synonymously as an apprenticeship.

== Related terms ==
In modern times, the role is also referred to as tsukibito (付き人; lit. "attached person"). Other terms include senshūsei (専修生; "specialized student") and kenshūsei (研修生; "intensive training student" or "research student"), although these terms are more general and do not necessarily indicate a live-in apprentice. Senshūsei and kenshūsei often refer to set training programs or goal-oriented training rather than students who have a special relationship with a teacher. For example, kenshūsei of the Kodokan dojo began training for Olympic Judo competition in 1960. The term renshū-sei (練習生) is used in Japanese pro wrestling. The term jikideshi translates to "personal pupil" and is a term used for students who show dedication and commitment to their master and/or school.

== See also ==
- Gurukula
- Senpai and kōhai
