= Shihan =

Japanese martial arts term

Shihan (師範) is a Japanese term that is used in many Japanese martial arts as an honorific title for expert or senior instructors. It can be translated as "master instructor".

The use of the term is specific to a school or organization, as is the process of becoming a shihan. In aikido, the title shihan often is granted to teachers when they reach 6th dan. It is sometimes associated with certain rights, such as the right to give out black belt (dan) ranks. However, the title is distinct from the black belt ranking system (段位 dan'i).

== See also ==
- Sensei
