= Jon Mamoru Takagi =

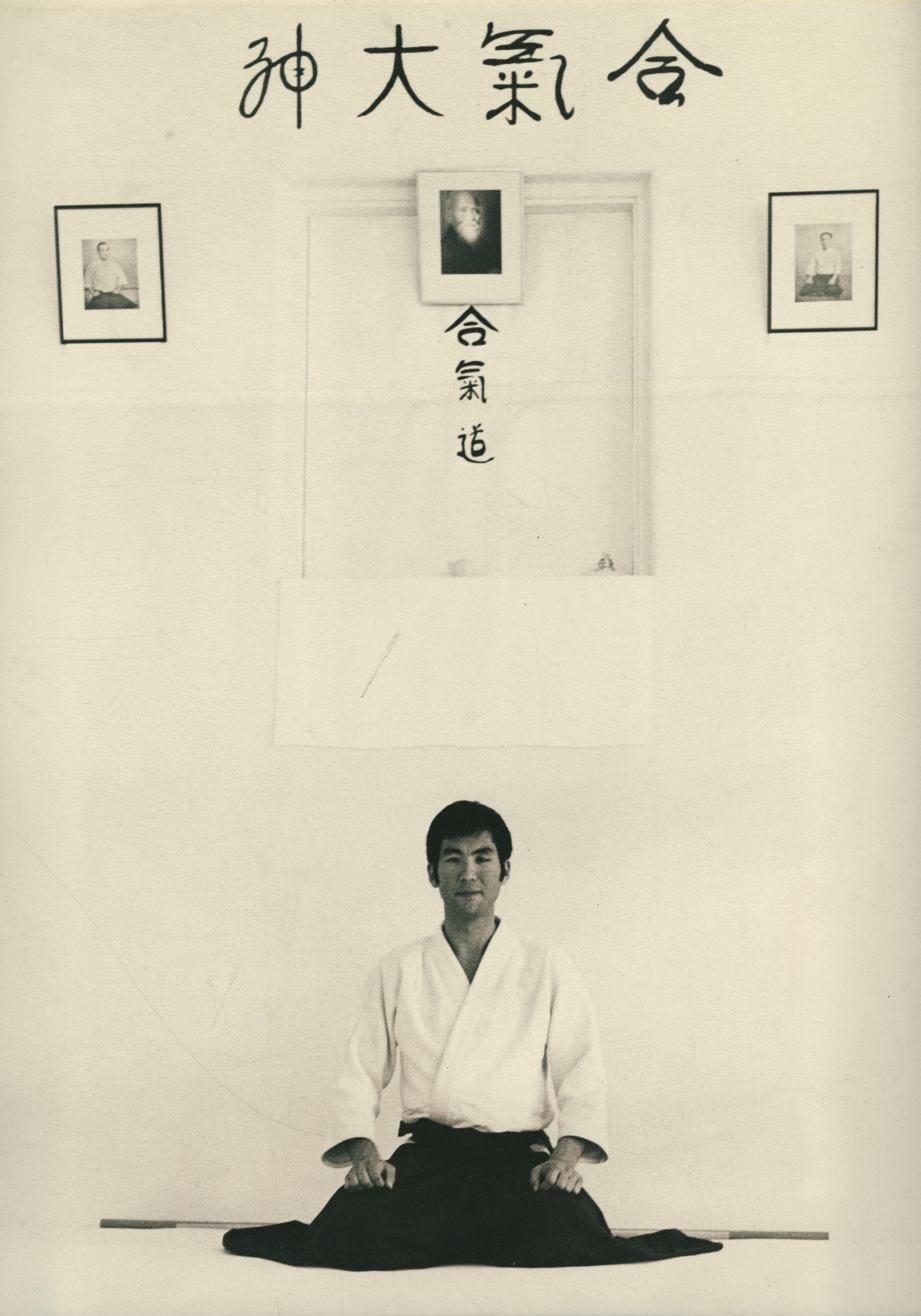
- Takagi at Arizona Aikikai, c. 1970
- Born: July 2, 1942; Honolulu, Territory of Hawaii
- Died: February 5, 1984 (aged 41)
- Nationality: (United States)
- Style: Aikido
- Teachers: Yukiso Yamamoto Yoshimitsu Yamada; Koichi Tohei Fumio Toyoda

Jon Mamoru Takagi (高木; July 2, 1942 – February 5, 1984) was a pioneer of aikido in the United States. He founded Arizona Aikikai, the first aikido dojo in Arizona. A second-generation American of Japanese descent born in Hawaii, Takagi's career was unexpectedly cut short when he was killed by a drunk driver.

== Personal life ==
Jon Takagi was born in Honolulu, Hawaii to first generation Japanese immigrants from Fukushima Prefecture, Japan. Takagi was raised with his four siblings in the Kaimuki neighborhood of Honolulu, on the island of Oahu. In 1966, he left Hawaii and toured the mainland United States by motorcycle. He married and had two children. On a Sunday morning in 1984, while on a bicycle ride near South Mountain, Arizona, Takagi was killed by a drunk driver.

== Aikido career ==
Takagi began training in aikido in 1958 with Yukiso Yamamoto in Nuuanu, Hawaii. During his tour of the mainland United States, he trained with Yoshimitsu Yamada at the New York Aikikai. In 1968, Takagi settled in Phoenix, Arizona, and began teaching aikido at the Downtown Phoenix Y.M.C.A. there. He continued his aikido training with Fumio Toyoda in Chicago, Rod Kobayashi in California (who would later found Seidokan Aikido), and Koichi Tohei, head instructor of Aikido World Headquarters in Japan, receiving 4th dan from Tohei in 1977.

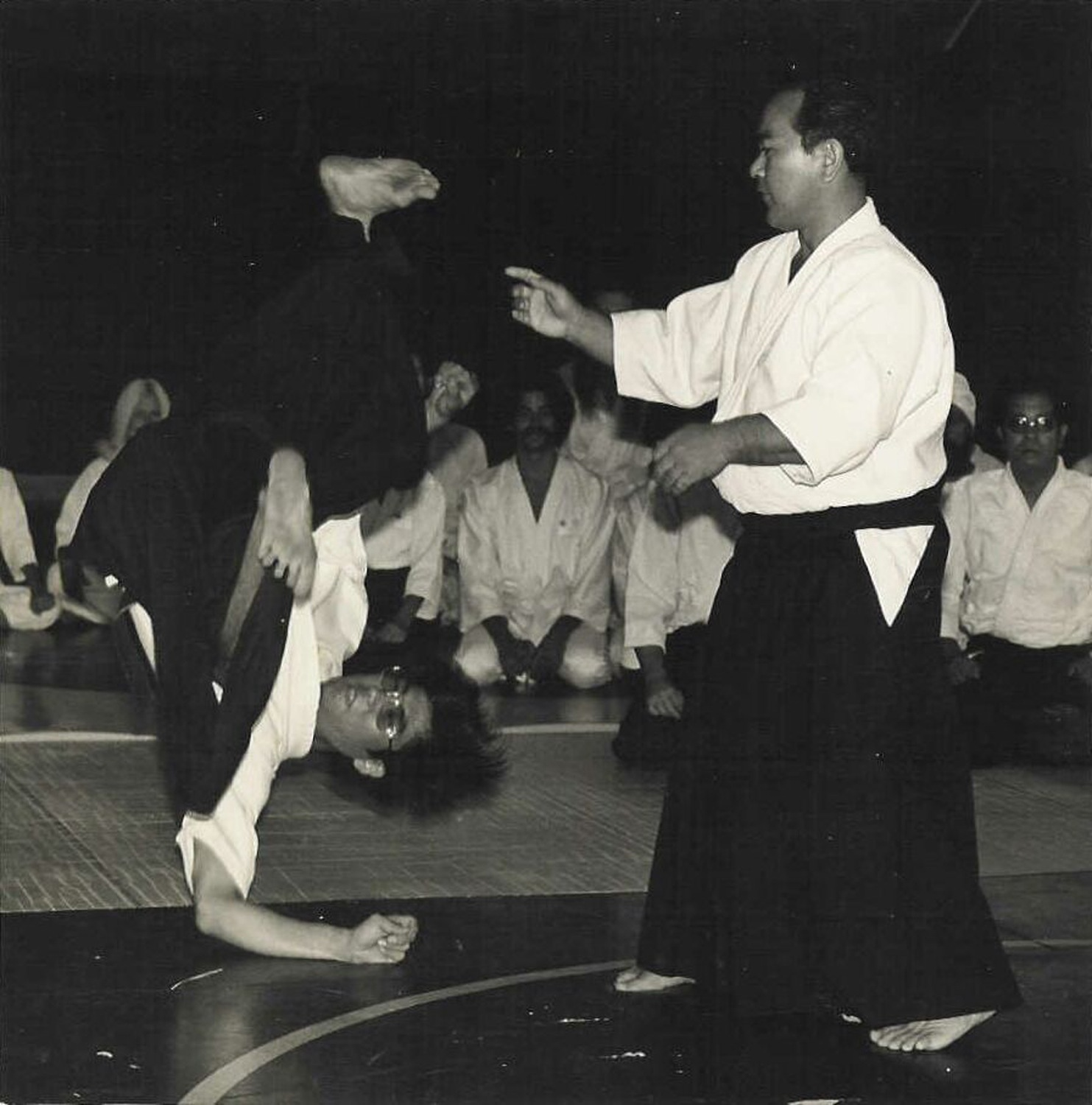
Koichi Tohei demonstrating aikido with Jon Takagi at Arizona State University in 1974.

With the support of Isao Takahashi and Chester Sasaki, Takagi founded Arizona Aikikai on First Street in downtown Phoenix. Through the 1970s and 1980s, Takagi taught regular aikido classes at Glendale Community College, Phoenix College, Arizona State University, and PREHAB of Arizona. Takagi was also a frequent instructor at aikido dojos in Tucson and Flagstaff, Arizona, and at seminars throughout the western United States. When Koichi Tohei formed Shin Shin Toitsu Aikido in 1974, Arizona Aikikai maintained its ties to that organization through Fumio Toyoda. Tohei visited Arizona Aikikai several times in the early 1970s. Takagi later co-founded the Aikido Association of America with Toyoda in 1981. Takagi also opened the doors at Arizona Aikikai to other martial arts schools, including tai chi and Iaido, as the predecessor to the Arizona Arts Center in Phoenix.

Takagi wrote that, "...As an art of self-defense, aikido takes as the basis of its philosophy the concept of harmonizing with our partner, as opposed to conflicting with him... aikido is not merely an art of self-defense. Into its techniques and movements are woven elements of philosophy, psychology, and dynamics. The concepts of total harmony and non-aggression can only increase one's self-respect. When self-respect is achieved, humor, kindness, compassion, tolerance and affection follow."

Toyoda posthumously awarded Takagi 6th dan.
