= Goleta Cultural School =

Coordinates: 34.4350°N 119.8280°W

- Company type: Private
- Industry: Cultural, Entertainment
- Founded: Goleta, California, United States
- Headquarters: Goleta, California, United States
- Area served: Santa Barbara County
- Key people: Ken and Miye Ota, Founders
- Services: Ballroom Dance Instruction; Martial Arts Instruction
- Website: http://www.goletaaikido.net

The Cultural School of Goleta is a multi-purpose venue built by Ken and Miye Ota. The facility consists of a large ballroom with a sprung hardwood floor, two crystal chandeliers, a raised stage and is surrounded by built-in benches for seating. There is also an attached industrial kitchen, audio system, changing room, and storage for the additional chairs and tables. Also present, are removable tatami mats, which when applied to the entire ballroom floor, convert the space into a martial arts dojo, with a shomen at the main wall.

== The Ota's Cotillion ==
Following their mastery of square dancing, the Otas began ballroom dance training at the local Arthur Murray Dance Studio. From there, progressed to higher levels of instruction, which involved commuting to Los Angeles for lessons from a new group of English instructors teaching International Style.

After achieving their competitive goals, they founded a junior cotillion, where they could teach their son and his friends lessons in dance, manners, and other social graces. The Otas were also contracted to teach these classes by several schools and organizations over the years, including the Junior League of Santa Barbara.

The popularity of their classes grew such that they built the Cultural School on the same property of their Goleta home.

Ken Ota also taught ballroom classes at UC Santa Barbara for credit as well as through the leisure arts program; students would regularly host off-site social dances at the Ota's Cultural School to put their skills into practice.

Over the years, various social and competitive dance clubs have been formed and used the Cultural School as their preferred venue for off-site events.

== Goleta Aikido with Ki ==
While Ken Ota had a background in Sumo and Judo, the whole Ota family enrolled in Aikido classes under Isao Takahashi in 1963. The Otas then moved onto training in Shin Shin Toitsu Aikido under Koichi Tohei, which is the style they founded their school under.

The Cultural School features a traditional Japanese shomen, which includes photos of Morihei Ueshiba, Koichi Tohei, and a large Ki symbol painted by Tohei himself.

The Otas offered classes to children and adults in Judo and Aikido, and also consulted local law enforcement. Ken was hired to teach martial arts at UC Santa Barbara and Cal Poly San Luis Obispo, where he became advisor for several clubs, including a women's Judo team. Ken was also contracted by Panther Productions to produce a series of Aikido instructional videos.

Classes were eventually taken over by the Ota's son, Steve Ota, a member of the San Jose State University championship Judo team. Steve Ota served as head instructor and continued to train and receive recognized ranks in Ki Aikido, along with teaching Aikido at UCSB, until his death at the end of 2020.

== See also ==
- Ken and Miye Ota
