= Imaizumi =

Imaizumi (written: 今泉) is a Japanese surname. Notable people with the surname include:

- Kenji Imaizumi (今泉 健司, born 1973), Japanese shogi player
- Masatoshi Imaizumi (今泉 正稔), Japanese video game designer
- Shizuo Imaizumi (今泉 鎮雄, born 1938), Japanese aikidoka
- Yoshinori Imaizumi (今泉 吉典, 1914–2007), Japanese zoologist
- Yui Imaizumi (今泉 佑唯, born 1998), Japanese pop idol

== Fictional characters ==
- Shunsuke Imaizumi (今泉 俊輔), a character in the manga series Yowamushi Pedal
- Kagerou Imaizumi (今泉 影狼), a character in the Touhou game Double Dealing Character

== See also ==
- Imaizumi Station, a railway station in Nagai, Yamagata Prefecture, Japan
- Imaizumi Brings All the Gals to His House, a manga series written and illustrated by Gorō Nori
