= Shinshin-tōitsu-dō =

Japanese Yoga

Shinshin-tōitsu-dō (心身統一道, lit. way of mind-body unification) was founded by Nakamura Tempu (1876–1968) and is also known as Japanese Yoga. It is a study of the principles of nature and how they can be refined to help us realize the truths of nature and our full potentials.

== History ==
Nakamura Tempu created his Japanese Yoga from a variation of Raja Yoga and Karma Yoga, with an emphasis on the latter, which he learned from his Indian teacher Kaliapa (also spelled Cariapa and Kariappa), who took him to Gorkhe, in eastern Nepal.

== Goal and means ==
The goal of this way of mind and body unification is the free use of our mind and bodies and realize our true nature as human beings. We must be able to use our most fundamental tools (the mind and body) naturally, effectively and in coordination of each other to artistically express ourselves in life. Three elements that are key in this process are:

1. Training to reveal the nature of positivity.
2. Reformation of the subconscious.
3. Regulating and maintaining a balanced condition in the nervous system.

== Principles and methods ==
The teachings recognize four basic principles to unify mind and body (shin shin tōitsu no yondai gensoku):

1. Use the mind in a positive way (fudōshin resulting in ki no dashikata i.e. the projection of life energy).
  1. Examine the self.
  2. Analyze suggestions received from your environment.
  3. Examine your attitude towards others.
  4. Discover the present and let the worrying about the future or the past fall away.
  5. Experience the universal mind.
2. Use the mind with full concentration.
  1. Concentrate on matters you are familiar with.
  2. Concentrate on matters you wish to accomplish in a hurry.
  3. Concentrate on matters you believe are uninteresting.
  4. Concentrate on matters you believe are of no value.
3. Use the body naturally.
4. Train the body gradually, systematically and continuously.

According to the founder, humans need six qualities to express themselves in living.

quality	translation	description
tai-ryoku (体力)	the power of the body	physical strength, health and endurance
tan-ryoku (胆力)	the power of courage	
handan-ryoku (判断力)	the power of decision	good judgement
dankō-ryoku (断行力)	the power of determination	willpower for resolute and decisive action
sei-ryoku (精力)	the power of vitality	energy or life power for endurance and perseverance
nō-ryoku (能力)	the power of ability	the capacity of wide ranging ability and dexterous action

== Known practitioners ==
- Hiroshi Tada
- Masatomi Ikeda
- Kōichi Tōhei
- Sawai Atsuhiro

== See also ==
- Dynamic meditation
- Ki Aikido
