= Atsuhiro =

- Gender: Male

Origin
- Origin: Japanese
- Meaning: Different meanings depending on the kanji used

Atsuhiro (written: 厚裕, 淳宏, 淳弘 or 貴丈) is a masculine Japanese given name. Notable people with the name include:

- Atsuhiro Inukai (犬飼 貴丈; born 1994), Japanese actor
- Atsuhiro Iwai (岩井 厚裕; born 1967), Japanese footballer
- Atsuhiro Miura (三浦 淳宏; born 1974), Japanese footballer
- Atsuhiro Motoyama (本山 淳弘), Japanese video game composer
- Atsuhiro Sawai (born 1939), Japanese yoga teacher
