= Katsuzō =

- Gender: Male

Origin
- Origin: Japanese
- Meaning: Different meanings depending on the kanji used

Katsuzō, Katsuzo or Katsuzou (written: 勝造 or 勝蔵) is a masculine Japanese given name. Notable people with the name include:

- Katsuzo Kuronuma (黒沼 勝造; 1908–1992), Japanese ichthyologist
- Katsuzō Nishi (西 勝造; 1884–1959), Japanese aikidoka
- Katsuzō Toyota (豊田 勝蔵; 1882–1939), Japanese government official
