= Ken and Miye Ota =

Ballroom dancers and martial artists

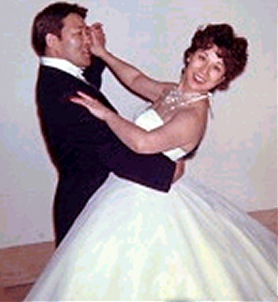
Ken and Miye Ota, 1959

Ken Ota and Miye Ota were an American married couple known for teaching martial arts, ballroom dancing, and social graces at their "cultural school" located in Goleta, California.

== Ken Ota ==
Kenji Ota (May 14, 1923 – November 10, 2015) was a second-generation Japanese-American, also known as Nisei, raised in Lompoc, California. Following the enforcement of Executive Order 9066, he and his family were placed in the Japanese American internment camps of World War II. There, he met and married his wife, Miye Ota.

In 1948, after his release from the internment camp, Ota settled in Goleta, California, and with his family's help, built a home from bricks on the converted swamplands.

Ken Ota died in Goleta, California on November 10, 2015, at the age of 92.

== Miye Ota ==
Miye Tachihara Ota (August 26, 1918 – September 15, 2024), was raised in Guadalupe, California. Like Ken, she was also Nisei and she and her family were placed in the Japanese internment camps of World War II, where she met her future husband at the Gila River Relocation Center.

Following her release from internment camp and a brief stay in Philadelphia, Pennsylvania, Miye leveraged her pre-war beauty school training to open her own salon, which the Otas built themselves from bricks attached to their home in Goleta. Miye would go on to be one of the founding members of the Goleta Chamber of Commerce and was recognized decades later as "Goleta's Finest Woman of the Year" during the Chamber's 69th year.

Miye Ota died on September 15, 2024, at the age of 106.

== Ballroom dance ==
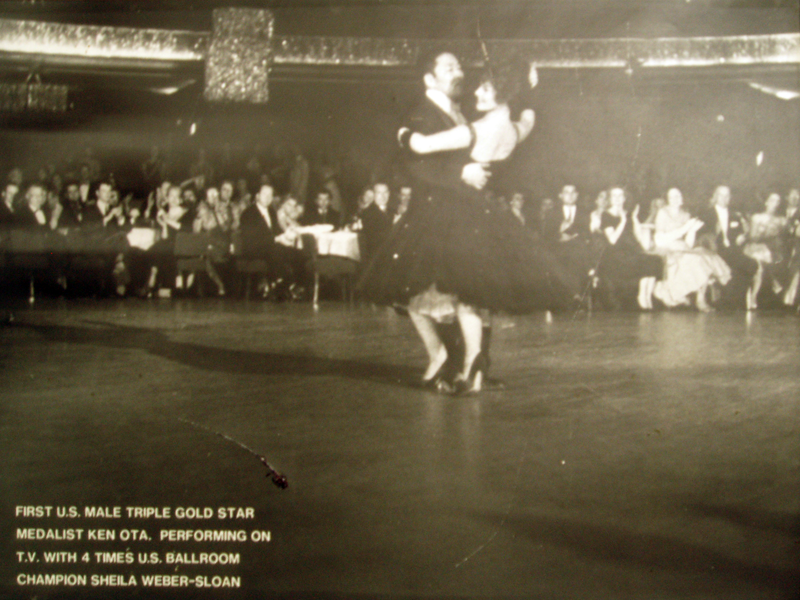
Ken dancing on television with Sheila Webber-Sloan at the California Star Ball

The Otas were avid partner-dancers involved with various social dance circles within the Santa Barbara County. Following their mastery of square dancing, they began ballroom dance training at the local Arthur Murray Dance Studio. As they progressed in their dance training they sought out higher levels of instruction, which involved commuting to Los Angeles for lessons from a new group of English instructors teaching International Style.

Alex Moore certified both Ken and Miye in the International Style of ballroom dance. Ken went on to be the first man in the U.S. to get the highest Arthur Murray student credentials, Triple Gold Star and Gold Bar. The Otas were also certified through the Imperial Society of Teachers of Dancing (ISTD).

Ken's most notable instructor was Sheila Webber-Sloan, a national ballroom dance champion; the Webber-Sloan and Ota partnership garnered multiple awards and had several appearances on television, including a broadcast of the California Star Ball.

It was not until chaperoning a school dance for their son, Steve Ota, did they feel compelled to start teaching dance lessons to children; they believed children could learn more tasteful ways of dancing with each other. Having achieved their competitive goals, they founded a junior cotillion, where they could teach their son and his friends lessons in dance, manners, and other social graces. The Otas were also contracted to teach these classes by several schools and organizations over the years, including the Junior League of Santa Barbara.

The popularity of their classes grew such that they built their own "cultural school" adjacent to their Goleta home. The school's brick structure houses a spacious hardwood floor surrounded by white benches and mirrors, and a ceiling that adorns two crystal chandeliers.

For decades, Ken Ota taught ballroom dancing for UC Santa Barbara as a class for physical education credit, along with separate sessions open to the community through the university's leisure arts program. His classes also spawned several student-run social clubs that revolve around swing dancing, ballroom, and competitive ballroom dancing.

== Martial arts ==
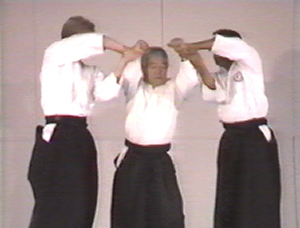
Ken Ota teaching Aikido, 1988

Ken Ota originally practiced the grappling arts Sumo and Judo, which he regularly participated in from the time he had been placed in the Japanese internment camps of World War II. It was not until 1963 during his regular commutes to Los Angeles for dance lessons that he came across the art of Aikido. The whole Ota family enrolled in classes under Isao Takahashi. The Otas then moved onto training in Shin Shin Toitsu Aikido under Koichi Tohei.

The Otas built their own "cultural school" next to their Goleta home, which could easily transform into a dojo when fitted with removable tatami mats; the main wall adorns a traditional Japanese shomen, which includes photos of Morihei Ueshiba, Koichi Tohei, and a large Ki symbol painted by Tohei himself.

The Otas offered classes to children and adults in Judo and Aikido, and also consulted local law enforcement. Ken was hired to teach martial arts at UC Santa Barbara and Cal Poly San Luis Obispo, where he became advisor for several clubs, including a women's Judo team. Ken was also contracted by Panther Productions to produce a series of Aikido instructional videos.

Ken and Miye's son, Steve, returned to Santa Barbara after completing his studies at San Jose State University, where he was a member of the championship Judo team. In the years since Steve's return, many of the adult and high-level classes had transitioned to Steve's direction, as he continued to train and receive recognized ranks in KI Aikido, along with teaching Aikido at UCSB. Steven Ken Ota died on November 1, 2020, at the age of 72.

== See also ==
- Goleta Cultural School
