= Kokikai =

Kokikai Aikido
- Also known as: Kokikai Aikido International
- Date founded: 1986
- Founder: Shuji Maruyama
- Current head: Shuji Maruyama
- Arts taught: Aikido
- Ancestor schools: Aikikai, Ki-Aikido
- Official website: https://www.aikidokokikai.org/

Kokikai (光気会) is a style of Aikido, founded by Shuji Maruyama. The organization is called Kokikai Aikido International.

The Kokikai style emphasizes natural movement, ki development, relaxation, good posture and mind-body coordination. It is a minimalist martial art that focuses on making techniques effective while using little physical effort. An axiom of the style is “minimum effort for maximum effect.” The name Kokikai means “school of radiant ki”.

The style lists four basic principles:

- Keep One point (to develop calmness)
- Relax progressively
- Find Correct Posture (in everything)
- Develop your Positive Mind

The style was founded by Shuji Maruyama, and continues to be led by him. He continues to develop the art, so there is no set textbook way of performing any technique.

Maruyama was originally sent to the United States in 1966 by the Aikikai Hombu. He taught in the US for many years. When Koichi Tohei left Aikikai to found Ki-Aikido, Maruyama followed him. This was consistent with Japanese martial arts tradition, because he was a direct student of Tohei. Maruyama separated from Ki-Aikido in 1986 to found the Kokikai organization.

As of August 2019, there are Kokikai dojos listed in Australia, Germany (Aikido Kokikai Berlin), Canada, Israel, Japan, Russia and in the United States, which are now organized as Aikido Kokikai Federation USA.
