= Miye =

Miye is a given name. Notable people with this name include:

- Miye D'Oench (born 1994), American ice hockey player
- Miye Matsukata (1922–1981), Japanese-born American jewelry designer
- Miye Oni (born 1997), Nigerian-American basketball player
- Miye Ota (1918–2024), American teacher of dance
