= Nishi Shiki =

Health exercises system founded in 1927 by Katsuzō Nishi

Nishi Shiki (Nishi Health System) consists of health exercises purported to activate certain bodily functions. It was founded in 1927 by Katsuzō Nishi.

Because Katsuzō Nishi was also an aikido teacher at Aikikai Hombu Dojo, many aikidoka were introduced to the Nishi Health System, resulting in the incorporation of certain exercises, like the fish exercise (kingyo undō, 金魚運動), into aikido and the way aikidoka took care of their health.

The organisation around this system is called Nishikai, which helped Koichi Tohei in starting up aikido in Hawaii, which has members of Nishi-kai on all of its islands .

The Nishi Health System is partly incorporated in Genkikai by Masatomi Ikeda.

== Exercises ==
=== Six laws of the Nishi Health System ===
1. heisho (平床寝台)
2. kochin (硬枕利用) When you sleep, use the hardest possible bed and hard semi-cylindrical pillow.
3. kingyo undō (金魚運動) Swing your hips horizontally like fish swimming about 1 minute.
4. mōkan undō (毛管運動) Lie on your back and rise your arms and legs. Then shake your arms and legs about 1 minute.
5. gasshō gasseki undō (合掌合蹠運動) Lie on your back and join your hands and feet. Then slide your hands and feet horizontally about 10 times. When finished, rest with your hands and feet drawn in about 2 minutes.
6. hifuku undō (背腹運動) Sit down Japanese style and swing your upper body centering on your hips about 10 minutes. When you are incline position, pump your abdomen. When you are upright position, shrink your abdomen.

=== Four primary elements ===
1. skin
2. nutrition
3. limbs
4. mind

=== Five self diagnostic methods ===
These are five flexibility exercises that are purported to provide diagnostics about internal organs, see reference for detailed description of the exercises. They are said to indicate whether the following organs are in good condition:Source:

1. spine and stomach
2. sexual organs and sciatic nerve
3. kidneys
4. liver
5. intestines and urinary organs

== Students ==
- Masatomi Ikeda

== Books ==
- Live Longer the Nishi Health System Way Prevent Sickness Maintain Health and Treat Ailments by Katsuzō Nishi.
- Nishi System of Health Engineering by Katsuzō Nishi. Kessinger, 1936, paperback, ISBN 0-7661-5156-5
- Nishi System of Health Engineering : Based on an Entirely New Theory of Blood Circulationby by Katsuzō Nishi. Hardcover.
- Live Longer the Nishi Health System Way Prevent Sickness Maintain Health and Treat Ailments by Katsuzō Nishi. 1997. paperback.
- Genki Kai by Eric Graf. Aikido Ikeda-Dojo La Chaux-de-Fonds, La Chaux-de-Fonds, Switzerland, 2003, hardcover.
