= Masatomi =

- Gender: Male

Origin
- Origin: Japanese
- Meaning: Different meanings depending on the kanji used

Masatomi (written: 昌福 or 昌富) is a masculine Japanese given name. Notable people with the name include:

- Masatomi Ikeda (池田 昌富; born 1940), Japanese aikidoka
- Masatomi Kimura (木村 昌福; 1891–1960), Imperial Japanese Navy admiral

== See also ==
- 7614 Masatomi, a main-belt asteroid
