= Masatomi Ikeda =

Japanese aikido teacher (1940–2021)

- Born: April 8, 1940; Japan
- Died: June 21, 2021 (aged 81)
- Occupation: Aikido teacher
- Title: Shihan, 7th dan Aikikai

Masatomi Ikeda (池田 昌富, いけだ まさとみ, Ikeda Masatomi) (April 8, 1940 – June 21, 2021) was a Japanese aikido teacher who held the rank of 7th dan Aikikai.

== Biography ==
Masatomi Ikeda was born in Tokyo, Japan. He was already interested in budō and sports in general when he was young which resulted in achieving a 5th dan in sumo and 4th dan in judo. Until he started with Aikido in 1958, judo played an essential role in his life. In 1960 he enlisted into the dojo of Hiroshi Tada (9th dan Aikikai). He started intensively practising budō, and especially aikido. He trained himself in judo in the Kodokan Institute and at the dojo of Dokkyo High School. For sumo he trained in the stable Kise's Sumo.

In 1964, he graduated at the Nippon Physical Education University. In October 1965, he went on his first journey to Italy with the aim of promoting Aikido which he had been teaching for approximately five years. He also obtained a university degree in gymnastics and hygiene; he would have had the possibility of teaching the gymnastics as a pedagogue, but he chose the way of the budōka and spent his time as an aikido professor, primarily in Naples.

Ikeda, 1979, Switzerland, 10 years ACSA

In 1971, he returned to Japan with the aim of relearning the aikido from the basics. Besides aikido, he worked as gymnastics professor at the Dokkyo High School, where he had been a pupil before. Seven years passed like that instead of one to two years as he had envisaged. He collected some experience in teaching and some knowledge in Asian medicine like Seitai or seibukenkoho (method of cure according to the manner of seibu). He had also the possibility to learn the hojo kata (in the Kobudo Chokoshinei-ryu).

In 1977, he went on a journey in Europe on the request of the Swiss Cultural Association for Aikido (ACSA). He arrived in Switzerland in October of that year. When he stayed in Italy, he was also teaching judo, but from his arrival in Switzerland on, he completely dedicated his life to aikido. He was a delegated teacher by the Aikikai Foundation in Tokyo and his occupation was promoting Aikido. He served the ACSA for more than 25 years.

In 1986, the Aikido Ikeda-Dojo Zurich opened. During the following years, as a technical director of the ACSA, he visited without a break the various ACSA dojos all over Switzerland at a rate of two or three dojos per week! He did this in addition to the weekly half-dozen trainings which he directed in his dojo in Zurich. In parallel, he led national and international training seminars to maintain the friendship with and to practice with aikidoka nearby countries. Examples are the yearly ACSA winter stage in Zurich, Switzerland, which he led on many occasions together with Katsuaki Asai of the German Aikikai and Hideki Hosokawa of the Italian Aikikai, the yearly summer stage in Saignelégier, Switzerland, with his teacher Hiroshi Tada shihan of the Italian Aikikai and the yearly late summer or early autumn stage in Praiano, Italy, with Pasquale Aiello who were all also good friends of his.

Ikeda, 1995, Italy Praiano

In 1989, he received the 7th dan in Aikikai aikido. Thereafter, he was also occupied with the Aikikai in the Czech Republic since 1995, with the Slovak Aikido Association since 1996 and the Yugoslav Aikido Federation in Serbia since 1997. In 1998 he became also the technical director for the Turkish Aikido Association, and in 1996 he became technical adviser of the International Aikido Federation together with Hiroshi Isoyama (9th dan Aikikai). In parallel, he regularly taught seminars in countries like Croatia, Hungary, Russia and Poland. Also new connection with Netherlands was evolving however he did not get around to visit it.

Ikeda, 1999 June, Switzerland Basel, 30 years ACSA

During the height of his aikido career was the 30 year anniversary of the ACSA which was celebrated with a major international seminar in Basel from the June 5 to 7, 1999. On this gigantic event, shihan from many European countries conducted trainings and demonstrations.

In order to teach and practice Aikikai Aikido more efficiently and effectively, he developed a didactic system called Sanshinkai Aikido (三心会合気道). It consists of three pilars of which aikido is the main one. The additional two are, what he called, genkikai (a collection of health exercises) and the hojo no kata. As all pilars use the same principles, they support each other, making it an integral system.

In spring 2003, Ikeda had to abruptly stop all his activities as aikidoka due to a stroke. He then returned to Japan.

== Teachers ==
The following persons were his most influential teachers in alphabetical order:

- Yasushi Namiki, teacher in Kashima Shinden Jikishinkage-ryū
- Katsuzō Nishi, founder of Nishi Shiki
- Haruchika Noguchi, founder of Seitai
- Hiroshi Tada, 9th dan Aikikai shihan
- Nakamura Tempu, founder of Shin Shin Tōitsu-dō

== Colleagues ==
The following people were his close colleagues during his aikido career:

- Pasquale Aiello, 7th dan Aikikai
- Agostino Pagano 7th dan Shihan Aikikai
- Katsuaki Asai, 8th dan Aikikai shihan
- Hideki Hosokawa, 7th dan Aikikai shihan

Note that this list does not specify who are his senpai and kōhai.

== Students ==
These are the most notable of his students in alphabetical order:

- Urs Aepli, 6th dan Aikikai
- Fritz Heuscher, 6th dan Aikikai
- Waldemar Giersz, 5th dan Aikikai
- Eric Graf, 6th dan Aikikai
- Daniel Keller, 5th dan Aikikai
- Miroslav Kodym, 6th dan Aikikai
- Francesco Marrella, 7th dan shihan Aikikai
- Paul Michellod, 5th dan Aikikai
- Joe McHugh, 5th Dan Aikikai
- Hansruedi Nef, 6th dan Aikikai
- Michele Quaranta, 7th dan shihan Aikikai
- Roman Lamos, 4th dan Aikikai
- Andreas Schriber, 5th dan Aikikai
- Therese Uhr, 5th dan Aikikai
- Daniel Vetter, 7th dan Aikikai
- Jacques Margairaz, 4th dan Aikikai
- Rino Bonanno 6th Dan Aikikai
