= Fukuoka Prefectural Shuyukan High School =

- 福岡県立修猷館高等学校
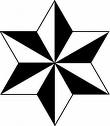

Location
- 6-1-10 Nishijin Sawaraku 814-8510; Fukuoka; Japan
- 33°35′02″N 130°21′24″E

Information
- Type: Public secondary, co-educational
- Motto: 文武両道 Bunbu Ryōdō
- Established: February 6, 1784; 242 years ago
- Grades: 10-12
- Enrollment: 1280
- Campus: Urban
- Website: shuyu.fku.ed.jp

Fukuoka Prefectural Shuyukan Senior High School (福岡県立修猷館高等学校, Fukuoka Kenritsu Shūyūkan Kōtō-gakkō) is a co-educational public senior high school in Fukuoka, Fukuoka, Japan.

== Overview ==
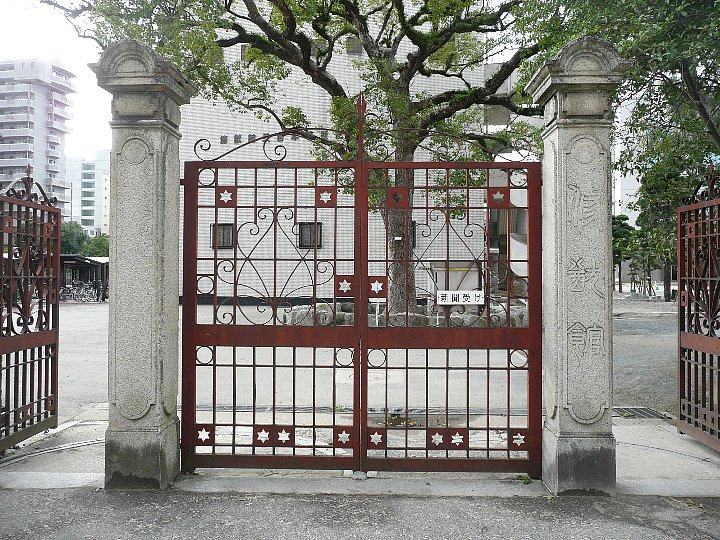
Shuyukan Old Main Gate

Founded as a Han school in 1784, Edo period, Shuyukan is one of the oldest high schools in Japan with a history of over 200 years. After the Meiji Restoration, it was transformed into an English vocational school where all subjects were taught in English. Today, it is considered to be among the elite schools in Japan with a number of graduates continuing their studies at prestigious universities in Japan. The name "Shuyu" was taken from a passage in "The Charge to Prince Weizi" from Shangshu, a history text from ancient China. The school logo Rokkosei (Six-Light-Star) is a reference to a poem by Shu Shunsui (1600–1682), and is shaped after the North Star. Just as the North Star remains in the same position, consistently pointing towards the North, the Rokkosei serves as a pilot star that will guide the students throughout their lives towards a certain direction with unwavering faith.

== History ==
=== Timeline ===
- 1784 February 6: Opening of Shuyukan (Higashi Gakumon Keikojo) as a Han school of Fukuoka Han (administrative division) with the order from Kuroda Naritaka, the 9th lord of Fukuoka Domain
- 1885 May 30: By orders from Fukuoka Prefecture, school reopened as English vocational school Fukuoka Prefectural Shuyukan (The school celebrates this date as the school anniversary)
- 1894 December: Rokkosei chosen as the school emblem
- 1900 July 17: Campus relocated from Daimyo to Nishijin (current location)
- 1923 School anthem Kanka established
- 1945 June 19: Severely damaged by Fukuoka Air Raids
- 1949 April: Became Co-educational
- 1949 August: Renamed Fukuoka Prefectural Shuyukan Senior High School (current name)
- 2002 April: Designated as Super Science High School (until 2006)

=== Historical context ===
During the Edo period, Kuroda clan became the feudal lord of Chikuzen Province, what is now the Fukuoka Prefecture. The first lord Kuroda Nagamasa strongly believed in the power of both pen and the sword, and encouraged young samurais in his domain to diligently engage not only in military arts but also in literary arts. Nagamasa had a keen interest in a wide range of topics. At a time when Oriental disciplines like Confucian philosophy, Chinese literature and classical Japanese were the mainstream subjects for study, he extended his attention to Occidental philosophy as well, including the Christian bible. Because of the Kuroda family's continuous enthusiasm in adopting scholarly insights under their rule, Kuroda-han flourished in a variety of academic fields, producing scholars from Confucian philosophy and classical Japanese, to Chinese herbology, agriculture, and medicine. When Kuroda Naritaka (younger brother of Tokugawa Ienari, the eleventh shōgun of the Tokugawa shogunate) became the 9th lord of Kuroda-han at a young age in 1783, the advisory board summoned two renowned scholars of the domain, Takeda Sadayoshi and Kamei Nanmei, to each build a school in order to pass on their forebears’ scholastic ambition to the future generation.

=== Han-school years ===
In 1784, Takeda and Kamei each founded their han-schools and named them Shuyukan and Kantokan respectively. Due to the two schools’ location, Shuyukan was also called the Eastern-academy (Higashi Gakumon Keikojo), and Kantokan the Western-academy (Nishi Gakumon Keikojo). Kantokan was burnt down during a fire in 1798, and Shuyukan subsequently became the only han-school remaining. The 11th lord Nagahiro Kuroda was especially concerned with the education of his people throughout his life, and was particularly attentive to new cultures arriving from the Occident. With such pedagogical emphasis and interest in the West, he sent off many gifted samurais from Shuyukan to study at cosmopolitan cities in Japan and abroad, among whom was Kentaro Kaneko, a young han-samurai at the time, who continued his studies at Harvard University and later became one of the drafters of the Meiji Constitution. With the waves of social change during the Meiji Restoration period, however, educational reform was underway. Because han-schools were limited to elite students from privileged samurai families, they were to be abolished for a more democratic school system open for all. Shuyukan was closed down in 1871, and thus was the end of its years as a han-school.

=== Reopening, the war to present ===
In 1885, Lord Nagahiro Kuroda and Kentaro Kaneko appealed to Fukuoka prefecture for the reopening of Shuyukan as a prefectural school. On May 30, Fukuoka prefecture ordered the establishment of Fukuoka Prefectural Shuyukan as an English vocational school to produce English specialists. All classes were taught in English, and students studied Anglophone literature, Euro-American history, and Science using English-American textbooks. In 1897, Natsume Sōseki visited Shuyukan to observe the classes, as he was good friends with the first headmaster, Aritaka Kumamoto.

In March 1936, alumnus Kōki Hirota was appointed the prime minister of Japan. The same year, another graduate Tetsuo Hamuro won the gold medal in 200 meter breaststroke at the Berlin Olympics. Two years later, youths from Hitler-Jugend visited the Shuyukan campus and interacted with students. As the war deepened, only the freshmen were attending classes in 1944, as upperclassmen had been recruited for military services. The school was severely damaged with the Fukuoka Air Raids in the following year, and soon after, the war ended on August 15, 1945. Classes resumed in September under serious shortage of essentials and textbooks; the biology club and Rugby team resumed their activities in October. During this post-war period, school reform was executed in order to democratize the Japanese educational system. In 1949, Shuyukan was renamed Fukuoka Prefectural Shuyukan Senior High School. Under the occupation of GHQ who strongly discouraged any form of tradition that hinted at the legacy of Japan's feudal and militant past, even to keep the name "Shuyukan" was impossible without the extraordinary efforts of its alumni. This year the school admitted its first batch of female students in the incoming freshmen, and Shuyukan thus became the public co-educational high school that it is today.

== School life ==
=== Academics ===
Currently there are no vocational courses; education is limited to regular college preparatory courses. In the second year, students choose between Liberal Arts and Science tracks. In addition, there are Advanced Liberal Arts, Advanced Science, and Pre-Medicine classes for advanced students.

=== School events ===
Shuyu Cultural Festival and Shuyu Athletic Meet are the two biggest events at Shuyukan. These activities are operated by student-run executive committees. Starting a few weeks before the events, classes are shortened to four 40-minute periods, and the students are allowed to use all afternoon for event preparation.

- Shuyu Cultural Festival: Each class prepares a class exhibit, which can be anything from original research to cultural performance. In addition, cultural student groups present their work, and individual students may form a band or dance group to perform on the main stage and around the campus.
- Shuyu Athletic Meet: This event is held every year on a Sunday in September and is open to the public. All students are divided into five colored blocks (Red, Blue, Yellow, White, and Green). The first four colors compete against other blocks in athletic competitions, while the Green block organizes and supervises the events.
- Inter-class Sports Match: Each class forms sport teams (mainly ball games) and compete against each other.
- Jyuri Toha Ensoku: (Ten-Mile Walkathon) Students walk the Itoshima Peninsula, which is about 25 miles (refers to the old Japanese mile, ri).

=== Anthem ===
Shuyukan Kanka

- Year Written: 1923
- Lyrics: Yuichiro Fujisawa
- Music: Saburo Yokota

=== Uniform ===
Boys wear a black gakuran, with Rokkosei carved on the button. Girls wear the sailor outfit, with Rokkosei embroidered on the back. All students must wear the school badge on the collar.

== Anecdotes ==
- The school yard hosts a descendant of Isaac Newton's apple tree.
- The first headmaster Kumamoto Aritaka is said to be the model of the character Yamaarashi (Porcupine) in Natsume Sōseki's Botchan. Soseki himself visited the school to observe its English classes.

== Access ==
- Fukuoka City Subway: Nishijin Station
- Nishitetsu Bus: Shuyukan Bus Stop

== Notable alumni ==
The large number of notable alumni are called Shuyu Range.

=== Politics ===
- Kōki Hirota – The 32nd prime minister of Japan.
- Abe Isō – Christian Socialist
- Kaneko Kentarō – Drafter of the Meiji Constitution.
- Hiraoka Kotarō – The first president of Genyōsha.
- Seigō Nakano – Totalitarianism Political Leader
- Taketora Ogata – Vice prime minister in Shigeru Yoshida ministry and the former president of Liberal Party.
- Taku Yamasaki – Former vice president of Liberal Democratic Party
- Ryuichi Doi – member of the House of Representatives of Japan
- Yoshiaki Harada – member of the House of Representatives
- Hirofumi Ryu – member of the House of Representatives
- Gotaro Yoshimura – member of the House of Councillors

=== Journalism ===
- Shinichi Hakoshima – Former president of Asahi Shimbun

=== Business ===
- Dan Takuma – Director-General of Mitsui Zaibatsu
- Yasukawa Daigorō – The President of The Organizing Committee for The 1964 Summer Olympics in Tokyo
- Nobuo Mii – Former vice president of IBM Corporation
- Yasuchika Hasegawa – President of Takeda Pharmaceutical Company
- Masahiro Nakagawa – Vice chairman of Toyota Motor Corporation.
- Takashi Niino – President of NEC

=== Law ===
- Kōtarō Tanaka – judge of International Court of Justice, the chief justice of the Supreme Court of Japan

=== Academic ===
- Kikutaro Baba – malacologist

=== Medicine ===
- Yoshitake Yokokura – President of the World Medical Association
- Seigō Izumo – Professor of Medicine at Harvard Medical School

=== Government ===
- Akashi Motojirō – General in the Imperial Japanese Army, The 7th Governor-General of Taiwan
- Yamaza Enjirō – diplomat
- Isamu Chō – General in the Imperial Japanese Army
- Tokutaro Sakurai – General in the Imperial Japanese Army

=== Culture ===
- Yumeno Kyūsaku – author of detective fiction
- Haruo Umezaki – author of short story
- Kōichirō Uno – author of erotic literature
- Tempu Nakamura – founder of Shinshin-tōitsu-dō (Japanese Yoga)
- Hiroshi Yoshida – painter, woodblock print maker
- Sanzo Wada – painter, winner of 1954 Academy Award for Costume Design (Color)
- Zenzaburo Kojima – painter

=== Entertainment ===
- Jōji Yanami – voice actor
- Shinkichi Mitsumune – composer of anime musics

=== Athletics ===
- Tetsuo Hamuro – Gold Medalist in the 200 m Breaststroke event of the 1936 Summer Olympics in Berlin, Germany
