= Koretoshi Maruyama =

Japanese martial arts instructor

- Born: October 5, 1936; Japan
- Nationality: Japanese
- Style: Aikido
- Teacher: Morihei Ueshiba

Koretoshi Maruyama (born 5 October 1936) is a Japanese aikido instructor and founder of Aikido Yuishinkai (合氣道唯心会), he was an uchideshi of aikido founder Morihei Ueshiba and also a student of Koichi Tohei.

== Aikido ==
Koretoshi Maruyama first began studying aikido at the Aikikai Hombu Dojo in 1956 as well as training at the Keio University Aikido Club. After he graduated from Keio University, he continued his training in aikido, while working in the family business. In 1967 he delegated his responsibilities in the family business so that he could become a full time professional aikido instructor and he became an uchi deshi of Aikido Founder Morihei Ueshiba who awarded him the rank of 6th Dan in aikido.

== Ki no Kenkyukai ==
In 1972 Maruyama resigned from the Aikikai to become the chief instructor of the Ki No Kenkyukai which had been founded the previous year, at which time he was granted the rank of 8th Dan by Koichi Tohei. During his time at the Ki no Kenkyukai he had various teaching responsibilities throughout the world. In the period time he studied the healing arts of Seitei with Haruchika Noguchi, Soutai with Keizo Hashimoto and Reiki. He also studied Zen with Zen Priest Shogen Munou. In 1990 he was made President of the Ki no Kenkyukai.

He began to have reservations about the direction and policies of the Ki Society, and resigned from this position on July 29, 1991. After his resignation he entered a temple in Saitama Prefecture, where he remained for a period of ten years, eventually leaving in 2001.

== Aikido Yuishinkai ==
On 9 May 1996, whilst still in the temple Maruyama founded Aikido Yuishinkai having received permission from the temple priest to do so. Upon emerging from the temple in 2001 he began to teach aikido both in Japan and internationally. Aikido instructors from many countries joined Maruyama's new association and it grew rapidly over the course of the next ten years or so.
