= Frank Doran (aikidoka) =

American aikido teacher (1932–2026)

- Born: November 20, 1932
- Died: November 3, 2026 (aged 93)
- Style: Aikido
- Teachers: Robert Tann; Koichi Tohei
- Rank: 8th dan shihan (Aikikai)
- Years active: 1959–2024

Other information
- Occupation: Aikido teacher; former U.S. Marine hand-to-hand combat instructor
- Website: aikido-west.org

Frank Doran (November 20, 1932 – November 3, 2026) was an American aikido teacher. He founded Aikido West in Redwood City, California, in 1974 and was its chief instructor until he retired in 2024. He was also the first instructor of the Stanford Aikido Club at Stanford University, a post he held from 1972 to 2008. He achieved the rank of 8th dan from the Aikikai.

Doran trained in judo before taking up aikido in 1959, while he was a hand-to-hand combat instructor in the United States Marine Corps at San Diego. In 1962 he trained at the Aikikai Hombu Dojo in Tokyo under Koichi Tohei. He later worked as a police officer for eight years before teaching aikido full-time. He was a founder of the California Aikido Association, formed in 2002, and led its Division 2.

== Early life and military service ==
Doran began training in judo in 1955. By 1959 he was serving in the Marine Corps at the Marine Corps Recruit Depot in San Diego, on the hand-to-hand combat instructor staff.

== Aikido training ==
At the depot, Sergeant Robert Tann, a fellow instructor who had trained under Koichi Tohei in Honolulu, started an aikido class, and Doran became one of his students. (Note: An Aiki News interview gives the name as Bob Tann and says Doran studied with him for about six months.) He then trained for three years under Tokuji Hirata, a 5th dan who had opened a dojo in San Diego.

In 1962, shortly after receiving his shodan, Doran travelled to Tokyo to train at the Hombu Dojo with a letter of introduction to Tohei. There he met Robert Nadeau, with whom he later worked for several decades.

== Career ==
=== Police work ===
Doran worked as a police officer for eight years and left the job to teach aikido full-time. Aikido West describes him as a former police defensive tactics instructor. He served with the police department in Brisbane, California, and lived in Half Moon Bay.

=== Stanford University ===
Students founded the Stanford Aikido Club in 1972 with Doran as its first instructor. He remained the club's chief instructor until 2008 and has since returned as a guest instructor. He also taught an accredited aikido course at the university from 1972.

On May 21, 1978, Doran took part in "A Festival of the Happy Martial Arts" at Stanford's Frost Amphitheater. Before the event the San Francisco Chronicle and the Peninsula Times Tribune ran staff previews featuring Doran demonstrating aikido throws.

=== Aikido West ===
Doran founded Aikido West in 1974. The dojo began as Aikido of Woodside, training at a local high school, and was incorporated as a nonprofit at its Redwood City location in 1978. He was its chief instructor until he retired in 2024, at the age of 91.

=== California Aikido Association ===
The California Aikido Association was formed in 2002, succeeding a black-belt association organized in 1974. Doran was one of its founders, with Robert Nadeau and Patricia Hendricks, and led its Division 2. He taught seminars across the United States and in Europe, including at Aiki Expo 2002.

== Death ==
Doran died on November 3, 2026, at the age of 93.
