= Ikeda (surname) =

Ikeda (written: 池田) is the 26th most common Japanese surname. Notable people with the surname include:

- Akihisa Ikeda (池田 晃久; born 1976), Japanese manga artist
- Ayako Ikeda (池田 綾子; born 1978), Japanese songwriter and singer
- Chigusa Ikeda (池田 千草; born 1976), Japanese voice actress
- Chiyoki Ikeda (1920–1960), American intelligence operative
- Dai Ikeda (池田 大; born 1986), Japanese actor
- Daisaku Ikeda (池田 大作; 1928–2023), founder of Soka University of America and president of Soka Gakkai International (SGI)
- Daisuke Ikeda (池田大輔; born 1968), Japanese professional wrestler
- Eiji Ikeda (池田 永治; 1889–1950), Japanese cartoonist, painter, illustrator, and haiga artist
- Fumiyo Ikeda (born 1962), Japanese dancer, actress and choreographer
- Hayato Ikeda (池田 勇人; 1899–1965), Japanese politician and the 58th, 59th and 60th Prime Minister of Japan
- Hiroshi Ikeda (aikidoka) (池田 裕; born 1950), Aikido shihan
- Hiroshi Ikeda (director) (池田 宏; born 1934), film director
- Jon Ikeda (born 1965), American-born automobile designer and executive
- Junya Ikeda (池田 純矢; born 1992), actor
- Kaname Ikeda (池田 要; born 1946), Japanese ambassador and chief of ITER
- Kei Ikeda (池田 圭; born 1986), Japanese footballer
- Kikunae Ikeda (池田 菊苗; 1864–1936), Tokyo Imperial University professor, discoverer of the umami flavor
- Koki Ikeda (池田 向希; born 1998), Japanese racewalker
- Kotaro Ikeda (池田 幸太郎; 1895–1976), Japanese painter
- Kurena Ikeda (池田紅; born 2002), Japanese judoka
- Kyōsuke Ikeda (池田 恭祐; born 1992), Japanese actor and voice actor
- Maki Ikeda (池田 真紀; born 1972), Japanese politician
- Mamiko Ikeda (池田 眞美子), Japanese scriptwriter
- Masako Ikeda (池田 昌子; 1939–2026), Japanese voice actress
- Masanori Ikeda (池田 政典; born 1966), Japanese actor, singer, and voice actor
- Masaru Ikeda (池田 勝; 1942–2026), Japanese actor and voice actor
- Ikeda Masatomi (池田 昌富; 1940–2021), Japanese aikido teacher
- Masatoshi Gündüz Ikeda (池田 正敏 ギュンドゥズ, Ikeda Masatoshi Gyunduzu) 1926–2003, Japanese-Turkish mathematician
- Motohisa Ikeda (池田 元久; born 1940), Japanese politician
- Natsuki Ikeda (池田 夏希; born 1987), Japanese female tarento, actress, and former gravure idol
- Riyoko Ikeda (池田 理代子; born 1947), Japanese manga artist
- Ryoji Ikeda (池田 亮司; born 1966), Japanese sound artist
- Sakiko Ikeda (池田 咲紀子; born 1992), Japanese women's footballer
- Ikeda Shigeaki (池田 成彬; 1867–1950), Japanese politician
- Shigeto Ikeda (池田 茂人; 1925–2001), Japanese physician, "father" of fiberoptic bronchoscopy
- Shintaro Ikeda (池田 信太郎; born 1980), Japanese badminton player
- Shūichi Ikeda (池田 秀一; born 1949), voice actor
- Shunsuke Ikeda (池田 駿介; 1940–2010), Japanese actor and model
- Suzee Ikeda (born 1947), American-born singer and record executive
- Tadao Ikeda (池田忠雄; 1905–1964), Japanese screenwriter and film director
- Tatsuo Ikeda (池田 龍雄; 1928–2020), Japanese artist
- Ikeda Terumasa (池田 輝政; 1565–1613), daimyō
- Toshiharu Ikeda (池田 敏春; 1951–2010), Japanese film director and screenwriter
- Toshio Ikeda (池田 敏雄; 1923–1974), Japanese engineer and computer scientist
- Ikeda Tsuneoki (池田 恒興; 1536–1584), daimyō and military commander
- Yoshinobu Ikeda (池田 義信; 1892–1973), Japanese film director
- Yoshio Ikeda (池田 芳夫; born 1942), Japanese jazz double-bassist
- Yukihiko Ikeda (池田 行彦; 1937–2004), Japanese politician
- Yukiko Ikeda (actress) (池田 有希子; born 1970), Japanese actress
- Yukiko Ikeda (born 1971), Japanese archer
- Yuta Ikeda (池田 勇太; born 1985), Japanese professional golfer
