= Shizuo Imaizumi =

Japanese aikido teacher (born 1938)

Shizuo Imaizumi (今泉鎮雄), born 1938) is a Japanese aikido teacher. He holds a rank of 7th dan from the Ki Society, but broke away from the Ki Society in 1987 to found the Shin-Budo Kai style of aikido.

== Early Aikido Career ==
Imaizumi sensei first started training in aikido in April 1959 during his days as a student at Waseda University in Tokyo. He went to training sessions at the Aikikai Hombu Dojo which was located near the Waseda Campus. It was there he first met Morihei Ueshiba, (Ōsensei), during one of his aikido demonstrations.

In 1965, Imaizumi became an apprentice to the teaching staff, shidoin, at the Hombu Dojo. He would often serve as uke, for Ueshiba during his early morning classes.

== First visit to the United States ==
During his time at the Hombu Dojo he frequently trained under Koichi Tohei and became one of his supporters. This was a time of increasing tensions between several high-ranking instructors of the Hombo Dojo and the head instructor Koichi Tohei, starting with the death of Morihei Ueshiba in 1969 and culminating in Tohei's departure from the Aikikai in 1974. During that time in spring of 1972 he was instructed by Tohei, who was still serving as head instructor at the Hombu Dojo, to travel to Los Angeles in the United States to teach aikido and ki-principles under Roderick Kobayashi Sensei, who was the chief Instructor of the Western States Aikido Federation at this time. During his stay there he would tour the immediate Western Area of the US, teaching regular classes and spread Tohei's ki-principles.

== Ki no Kenkyukai ==
Imaizumi returned to Japan after three months in California and served as an instructor at the Aikikai Hombu Dojo until 1974, when he joined Koichi Tohei in his breakaway from the Aikikai and the creation of Shin Shin Toitsu Aikido (Ki-aikido). Imaizumi and Tohei spent 1974 and early 1975 with the consolidation of the new Ki-aikido organisation and its new holdings.

== Second visit to the United States ==
In June 1975, he was once again instructed by Tohei to travel to the United States as an ambassador of Ki-aikido, this time to New York, to help organise and run the dojos which had earlier joined Toheis new organisation. Before this, however, he would first accompany Tohei on a tour of the US new Ki-aikido dojos, more specifically in the Honolulu, Chicago, Philadelphia (and finally) New York regions. Tohei would later continue on to Boston alone to hold seminars while Imaizumi remained in New York to get things in order. Shiuzo held his first Ki-aikido class on the evening of July 22.

== New York Ki Society ==
This new organisation was composed of Ki-aikido dojos in New York and was named New York Ki Society with Imaizumi becoming the Chief Instructor. On June 1, 1980, he was officially assigned the post of Chief Instructor for the Ki Society in the United States for a period of three years. After the three years had expired he nominated Koichi Kashiwaya, then the Chief Instructor of the Boulder Ki Society in Colorado, for the position of Chief Instructor for the United States. Imaizumi retained his title of main instructor for the New York Ki Society.

== Resignation and later return to aikido ==
In September 1987, Imaizumi resigned from the Ki no Kenkyukai and martial arts in general, in order help with the management of the family business. During his time away from aikido he kept in touch with several of his former students of the ki-dojos in the US. Many of these students, scattered around the US in New Mexico, New York and Texas, had by now left the Ki no Kenkyukai and founded their own independent dojos throughout the US. They were unanimous in their wish for the return of Imaizumi. Since the situation was stable with his family business, Imaizumi was able to return to the US and resume his aikido career in April 1988.

He did not return to his old position in New York, but assembled a group of independent ki-aikido dojos under a new organisation called Shin-Budo Kai. The organisation was officially created on October 1, 1988. Shin-Budo Kai is independent of both the Aikikai and Ki no Kenkyukai with Imaizumi serving as Chief Instructor. Shin-Budo Kai's emphasis is on knowledge provided not only by aikido, but on other martial arts and in Genkido; ki-exercises with the aim of teaching the student to fully understand the "True Martial Way" and the "way of cultivating one's body". Shin Budo Kai is headquartered in New York City, NY.
