= Atsuhiro Sawai =

Japanese yoga teacher and English professor

Sawai Atsuhiro is a Japanese yoga teacher.

== Early life and career ==
Sensei was born in 1939 in Japan. He met Nakamura Tempu Sensei in the 1950s, eventually becoming one of his students and obtaining the highest teaching credential in Shinshin-tōitsu-dō, a form of Japanese yoga and meditation. Nakamura Sensei is regarded as the father of yogic meditation in Japan, where his teachings are studied by people from every walk in life.

Sawai Sensei was a full professor of English at Kyoto Sangyo University. He became Professor Emeritus of English in 2004. Since his retirement he has had several top-selling books on Nakamura Tempu Sensei's teachings published in Japan. In addition, he is the leader of the Tenpu Juku in Kyoto, and he is the President of the Kokusai Nihon Yoga Renmei (International Japanese Yoga Association) that promotes instruction in Shinshin-tōitsu-dō around the world. The IJYA has members in over 20 nations, and it is a not-for-profit organization.

Sawai Sensei is a lecturer/seminar leader, and The True Paths to Meditation is his first book written specifically for Western readers. Its stated goal is to help the reader discover a way of living rooted in health and harmony via meditation. He is, in addition, a regular contributor to the IJYA Journal, writing about the forms of meditation created by his teacher Nakamura Tempu Sensei.
