= Kona Pacific Public Charter School =

Location
- 79-7595 Mamalohoa Highway; Kealakekua, Hawaii 96750; United States
- 19.520944°N 155.919878°W

Information
- School type: Charter school
- Established: 2008
- Director: Amber Herres Operations: Phil Centers
- Staff: 11 operations staff
- Teaching staff: 29 faculty and teaching support staff
- Grades: PK-8
- Enrollment: ~230
- Campus size: 3 acres
- Website: http://www.kppcs.org/

Kona Pacific Public Charter School is a public charter school located in Kealakekua, Hawaii. Founded in 2008, the school serves students in Pre-kindergarten through Grade 8.

== History ==
Kona Pacific Public Charter School was established by an act of the Charter School Review Panel in July 2008 and opened its doors to students that Fall. Kona Pacific serves a student body that is representative of the diversity of the South Kona community that it serves.

Each year, Kona Pacific provides educational services to 230 students, as well as supplemental social services to more than 100 school families.

Kona Pacific’s has a 98% historical enrolment. Since the founding year, the school has experienced annual growth of 25%. Throughout that time, student retention averaged 88%, also a notably high figure.

In its first 9 years of operation, Kona Pacific has also become a state pioneer in the field of school and community nutrition. In Fall 2012, Hawaii Island’s nutrition program vendor ceased operations with just 30 days notice. As the only federally approved food service vendor for nutrition programs in West Hawai‘i, their closure endangered the health and well-being of 450 impoverished citizens, mostly young children and elders. Kona Pacific immediately responded to this emergency need by developing their W.H.O.L.E. Foodservice program in time to ensure that no at-risk residents went hungry. The school also operates Hawaii's only mobile Summer Lunch Program, providing daily meals for vulnerable island children. Since the program's launch in June 2015, Kona Pacific has served more than 22,000 lunches to at-risk children at 10 sites throughout West Hawaii. Currently Kona Pacific offers no state or federal lunch provided. They do sell a reduced price lunch that is brought in on a daily basis by a 3rd party company.

== Campus ==
The 3-acre Kona Pacific campus is located mauka (upslope) of Kona Community Hospital in Kealakekua. The campus consisting of six buildings that house classrooms and administrative spaces.

== Curriculum ==
Kona Pacific Public Charter School offers a comprehensive education that weaves together three strands:

- A holistic, hands-on, project based Waldorf education, promoting student achievement in language arts, math, science, visual arts, foreign languages, musical training and movement;
- An educational program that embraces the values of Hawaiian culture, with particular focus on environmental education and community sustainability through understanding and respect for the people, land and sea of Hawai'i; and
- A curriculum rich in the life-sustaining practices of farming and gardening that are a vital part of Hawai‘i Island life.
