= Keala Keanaaina =

American football player (born 1976)

No. 44
- Position: Fullback / Linebacker

Personal information
- Born: May 30, 1976 (age 50); Kealakekua, Hawaii, U.S.
- Listed height: 6 ft 3 in (1.91 m)
- Listed weight: 264 lb (120 kg)

Career information
- High school: Junípero Serra (San Mateo, California)
- College: California
- NFL draft: 2001: undrafted

Career history
- San Jose SaberCats (2001–2004); Cleveland Browns (2003)*
- * Offseason or practice squad member only

Awards and highlights
- ArenaBowl champion (2004); First-team All-Arena (2003)

Career AFL statistics
- Rushes: 76
- Rushing yards: 315
- Rushing TDs: 15
- Tackles: 34.5
- Sacks: 1
- Stats at ArenaFan.com

Keala Keanaaina (born May 30, 1976) is an American former professional football fullback who played two seasons with the San Jose SaberCats of the Arena Football League. He first enrolled at San Jose State University before transferring to the College of San Mateo and lastly the University of California, Berkeley.

== Early life ==
Keanaaina played high school football at Junípero Serra High School in San Mateo, California. He earned WCAL Defensive Player of the Year and first team San Mateo County honors as a 6-1, 200-pound linebacker.

== College career ==
Keanaaina first played college football for the San Jose State Spartans. He played in ten of eleven games at linebacker and on special teams his freshman year in 1993. He then spent a year and a half preparing for his Mormon mission.

Keanaaina later transitioned to fullback for the San Mateo Bulldogs, recording over 1,000 rushing yards and fourteen rushing touchdowns on the season. He had previously served a two-year Mormon mission from 1996-97.

Keanaaina played for the California Golden Bears from 1999 to 2000.

== Professional career ==
Keanaaina was signed to the San Jose SaberCats' practice squad on June 13, 2001. He was placed on injured reserve on April 15, 2002. He rushed for 250 yards and ten touchdowns in 2003, earning first-team All-Arena honors. Keanaaina rushed for 65 yards and five touchdowns in 2004.

Keanaaina signed with the Cleveland Browns on July 22, 2003. He was released by the Browns on August 4, 2003.
