= Kealakekua, Hawaii =

Census-designated place in Hawaii, U.S.

Kealakekua
- Census-designated place
- Location in Hawaii County and the state of Hawaii
- Coordinates: 19°31′35″N 155°55′22″W
- Country: United States
- State: Hawaii
- County: Hawaii

Area
  - Total: 10.00 sq mi (25.89 km^{2})
  - Land: 10.00 sq mi (25.89 km^{2})
  - Water: 0 sq mi (0.00 km^{2})
- Elevation: 1,427 ft (435 m)

Population (2020)
  - Total: 2,307
  - Density: 230.7/sq mi (89.09/km^{2})
- Time zone: UTC−10 (Hawaii–Aleutian)
- ZIP code: 96750
- Area code: 808
- FIPS code: 15-33950
- GNIS feature ID: 0360942

Kealakekua is a census-designated place (CDP) in Hawaiʻi County, Hawaiʻi, United States. As of the 2020 census, Kealakekua had a population of 2,307.

It was the subject of the 1933 popular song "My Little Grass Shack in Kealakekua, Hawaii" by Bill Cogswell, Tommy Harrison and Johnny Noble, which became a Hawaiian music standard.

== Geography ==
Kealakekua is located on the west side of the island of Hawaii at 19°31′35″N 155°55′22″W (19.526436, −155.922891). It is bordered to the north by Honalo and to the south by Captain Cook. Hawaii Route 11 is the main road through the community, leading north 10 miles (16 km) to Kailua-Kona and south 49 miles (79 km) to Naalehu.

According to the United States Census Bureau, the CDP has a total area of 7.2 square miles (18.7 km^{2}), all of it land.

== Demographics ==
Historical population
Census	Pop.	Note	%±
2020	2,307		—
U.S. Decennial Census

=== 2020 census ===
As of the 2020 census, Kealakekua had a population of 2,307. The median age was 48.0 years. 17.8% of residents were under the age of 18 and 24.1% of residents were 65 years of age or older. For every 100 females there were 96.8 males, and for every 100 females age 18 and over there were 97.1 males age 18 and over.

0.0% of residents lived in urban areas, while 100.0% lived in rural areas.

There were 830 households in Kealakekua, of which 31.3% had children under the age of 18 living in them. Of all households, 48.7% were married-couple households, 16.5% were households with a male householder and no spouse or partner present, and 25.8% were households with a female householder and no spouse or partner present. About 23.9% of all households were made up of individuals and 12.4% had someone living alone who was 65 years of age or older.

There were 904 housing units, of which 8.2% were vacant. The homeowner vacancy rate was 0.8% and the rental vacancy rate was 2.4%.

Racial composition as of the 2020 census
Race	Number	Percent
White	637	27.6%
Black or African American	7	0.3%
American Indian and Alaska Native	30	1.3%
Asian	687	29.8%
Native Hawaiian and Other Pacific Islander	259	11.2%
Some other race	80	3.5%
Two or more races	607	26.3%
Hispanic or Latino (of any race)	270	11.7%

=== 2000 census ===
As of the census of 2000, there were 1,645 people, 639 households, and 423 families residing in the CDP. The population density was 218.1 inhabitants per square mile (84.2/km^{2}). There were 692 housing units at an average density of 91.7 per square mile (35.4/km^{2}). The racial makeup of the CDP was 24.74% White, 0.73% African American, 0.67% Native American, 36.84% Asian, 7.23% Pacific Islander, 2.07% from other races, and 27.72% from two or more races. Hispanic or Latino of any race were 9.18% of the population.

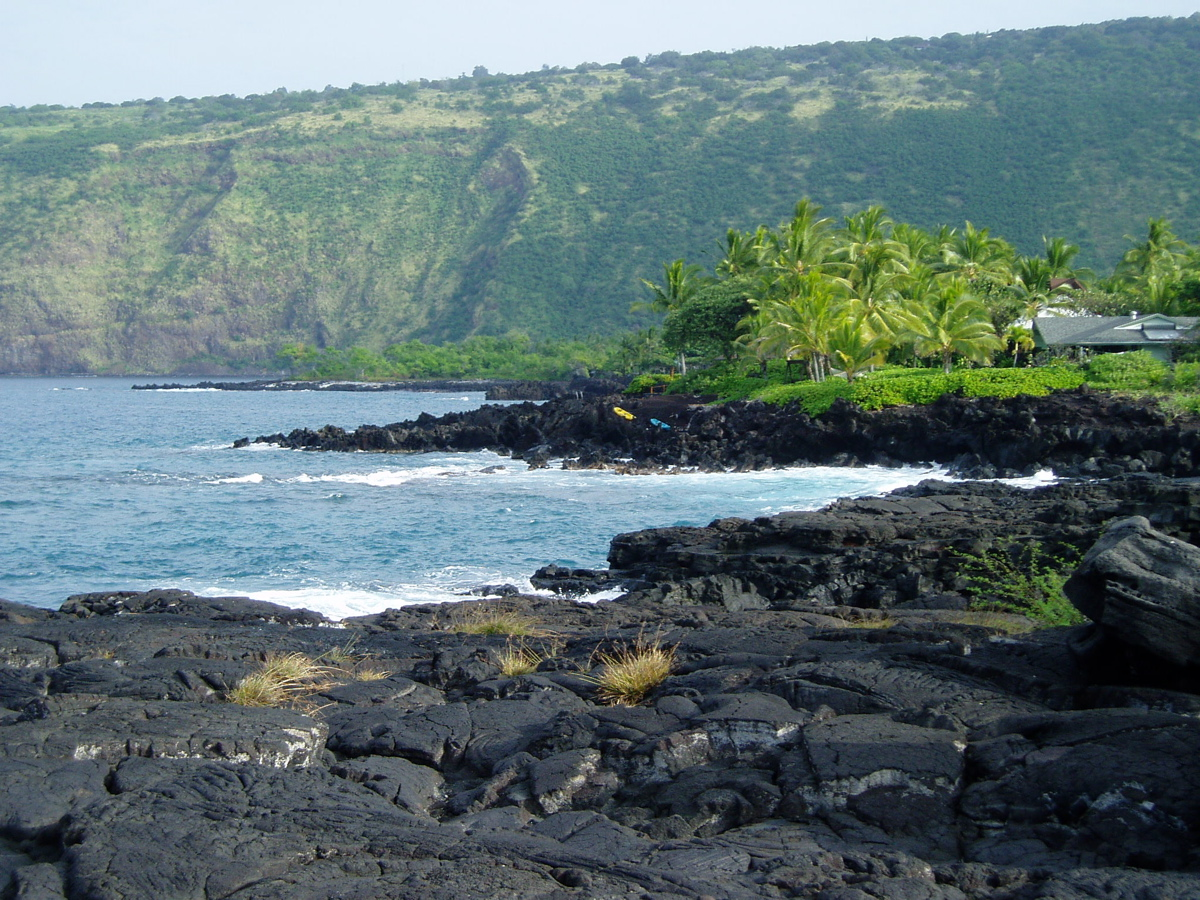
Kealakekua Bay

There were 639 households, out of which 25.5% had children under the age of 18 living with them, 49.0% were married couples living together, 12.2% had a female householder with no husband present, and 33.8% were non-families. 26.9% of all households were made up of individuals, and 9.2% had someone living alone who was 65 years of age or older. The average household size was 2.57 and the average family size was 3.10.

In the CDP the population was spread out, with 22.1% under the age of 18, 7.7% from 18 to 24, 25.3% from 25 to 44, 27.5% from 45 to 64, and 17.3% who were 65 years of age or older. The median age was 42 years. For every 100 females, there were 91.5 males. For every 100 females age 18 and over, there were 89.2 males.

The median income for a household in the CDP was $38,026, and the median income for a family was $45,192. Males had a median income of $29,333 versus $25,000 for females. The per capita income for the CDP was $21,495. About 9.2% of families and 13.7% of the population were below the poverty line, including 17.1% of those under age 18 and 6.3% of those age 65 or over.

== Education ==
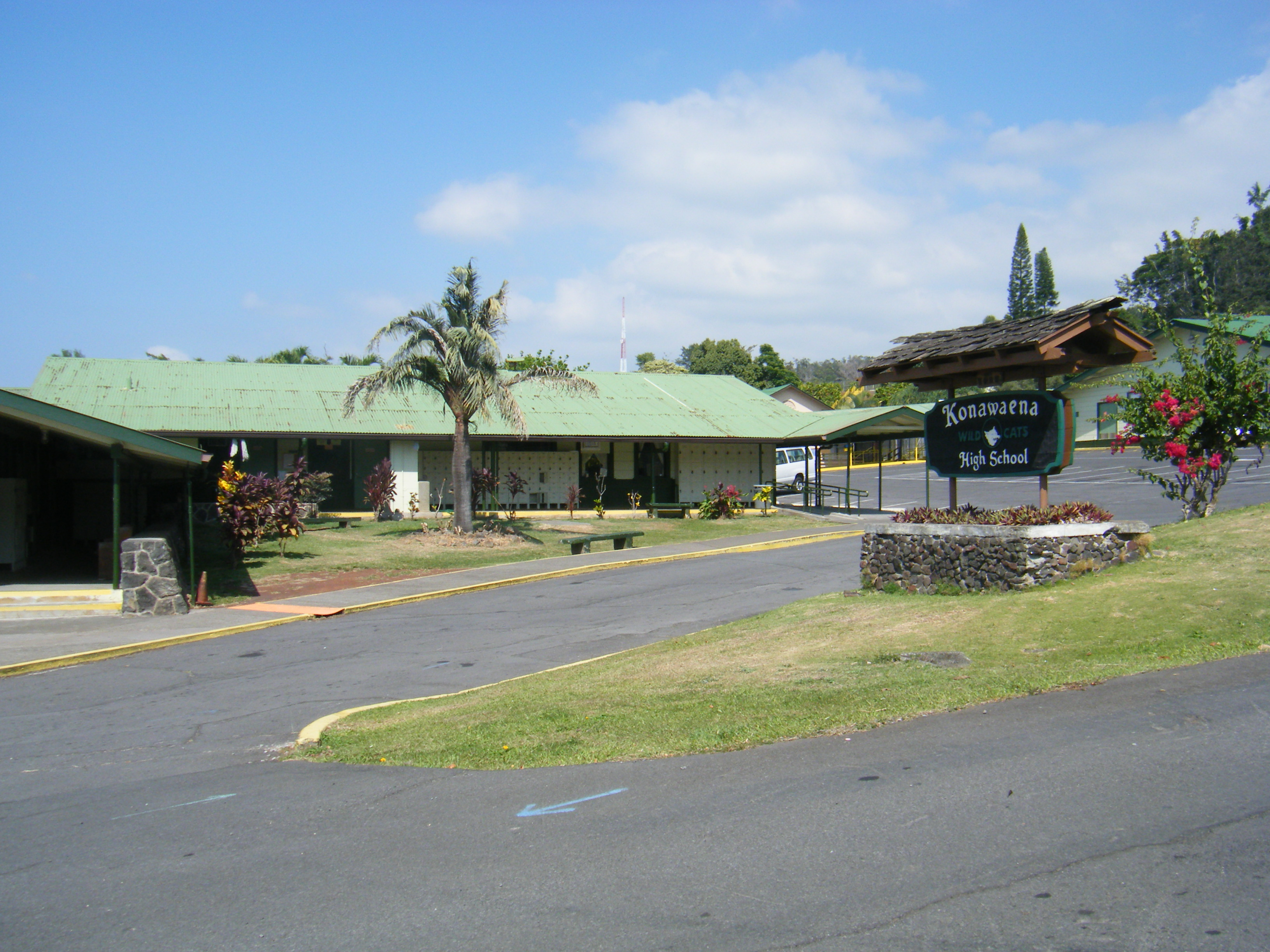
Konawaena High School

Hawaii Department of Education operates Konawaena Elementary School, which has a Kealakekua postal address but is in the Captain Cook CDP.

Two schools, Konawaena Middle School and Konawaena High School, are on a campus partially in Captain Cook CDP and partially in Kealakekua CDP.

Kona Pacific Public Charter School, founded in 2008, serves students in kindergarten through grade 8.

The Hawaii State Public Library System operates the Kealalekua Public Library.

== Notable people ==
- Brian Adams (1964–2007), professional wrestler and boxer
- Harry Kiyoshi Ishisaka (1927–1978), important figure in the development of aikido in southern California
- Keala Keanaaina (born 1973), American football player
- Henry Ōpūkaha`ia (1792–1818), a resident of Kealakekua, at 15 years old Ōpūkaha`ia boarded the Triumph to New Haven, Connecticut, where he was educated at Yale and was the impetus for Christian missionaries' arrival in Hawaii in 1820
- Ellison Shoji Onizuka (1946–1986), American astronaut lost in the destruction of Space Shuttle Challenger
- Douglas A. Zembiec (1973–2007), U.S. Marine Corps officer, Iraq and Afghanistan veteran, Silver Star, Bronze Star and two-time Purple Heart recipient

== See also ==
- Kealakekua Bay, where the British explorer Captain James Cook was killed, on 14 February 1779.
