= Nishi (surname) =

Nishi (written: 西 lit. "west") is a Japanese surname. Notable people with the surname include:

- Nishi Amane (西 周, 1829–1897), philosopher
- Daigo Nishi (born 1987), football/soccer player
- Haruhiko Nishi (1893–1986), Japanese diplomat
- Kanako Nishi (西 加南子, born 1970), women's racing cyclist
- Kanako Nishi (author) (西 加奈子, born 1977), Japanese author
- Katsuzō Nishi (西 勝造 1884–1959), technical engineer Japan's first subway project (the Tokyo subway) and Nishi Health System founder
- Kazuhiko Nishi (西 和彦, born 1956), Microsoft executive
- Kenichi Nishi (born 1967), video game designer
- Koichiro Nishi (西 興一朗; born 1979), Japanese actor
- Nishita Akter Nishi (born 2008), Bangladeshi cricketer
- Norihiro Nishi (born 1980), football/soccer player
- Takeichi Nishi (西 竹一, 1902–1945), Japanese army officer and Olympic gold medalist killed in the Battle of Iwo Jima, son of Nishi Tokujirō
- Nishi Tokujirō (西 徳次郎, 1847–1912), statesman and diplomat, negotiator in the Nishi-Rosen Agreement, father of Nishi Takeichi
- Yuki Nishi (西 勇輝; born 1990), Japanese baseball player

== Fictional characters ==
- Kinuyo Nishi, a character from Girls und Panzer
