= Seidokan Aikido =

Style of Aikido

- Date founded: 1981
- Country of origin: United States
- Founder: Roderick Kobayashi
- Arts taught: Aikido
- Official website: https://www.seidokanaikido.org

Seidokan Aikido (誠道館合気道, Seidōkan Aikidō) is a style of Aikido focusing on practical self-defense, as well as disorienting and pinning the attacker rather than killing. The organization was founded in Los Angeles, California in 1981 by Roderick Kobayashi, formerly a top instructor in the Ki Society. Kobayashi brought to the new organization the strong influence of his teacher Koichi Tohei, and Shin Shin Toitsu Aikido. Although independent and never formally affiliated with any parent organization, Seidokan's style and teachings were recognized by 2nd Dōshu Kisshomaru Ueshiba as a legitimate interpretation of the teachings of his father, Aikido founder Morihei Ueshiba.

The organization had its headquarters dojo at the Aikido Institute of Michigan in Battle Creek, but currently has no main dojo. It has branch dojos in several US states, Israel, and Tokyo, Japan.
