= Aikido Yuishinkai =

Japanese martial art

- Date founded: 9 May 1996
- Founder: Koretoshi Maruyama
- Current head: Koretoshi Maruyama
- Arts taught: Aikido
- Ancestor schools: Aikikai, Ki-Aikido
- Official website: aikidoyuishinkai.org

Aikido Yuishinkai (Japanese: 合氣道唯心会) is a style of aikido founded in 1996 by former Aikikai instructor and Ki no Kenkyukai president and chief instructor Koretoshi Maruyama. Aikido Yuishinkai has many dojos operating in Japan, Australia, New Zealand, Singapore, the Philippines, Argentina, the Netherlands, Germany, Denmark, the United Kingdom, Norway, and the United States. Koretoshi Maruyama was a personal student of the founder of aikido, Morihei Ueshiba, 4th generation, receiving a sixth dan, and today travels the world giving seminars. The school focuses on four levels of aikido technique and is influenced by the Daito Ryu and Shinkage-ryū sword style. In February 2016, Maruyama Sensei appointed Peter Kelly and Martijn van Hemmen as international instructors. In January 2019, he appointed Peter Kelly, tenth Dan, as international chief instructor.
