= Tempu Nakamura =

Japanese yogi (1876–1968)

Tempū Nakamura
- Born: July 20, 1876; Ōji, Kita-ku, Tokyo, Japan
- Died: December 1, 1968 (aged 92); Japan
- Occupation: Founder Shinshin-tōitsu-dō

Tempū Nakamura (中村天風; July 20, 1876–December 1, 1968) was a Japanese martial artist. He was the first to bring yoga to Japan and founded his own art called Shinshin-tōitsu-dō (心身統一道, lit. way of mind-body unification), and taught it at Tempu-Kai that he established.

== Biography ==
=== Early life and family background ===
Born in Tokyo, Japan, his original name was Saburō (Japanese: 三郎). He was the son of Sukeoki Nakamura (中村祐興 1829-1909) of Fukuoka Prefecture and Teu Nakamura (中村テウ 1858-1928) of Tokyo, known as Edo at the time. His father introduced the use of paper money in Japan when he served as the bureau director of the Japanese Ministry of Finance. Tempū Nakamura later moved to Fukuoka (福岡市, Fukuoka City), Fukuoka Prefecture (福岡県), to live with a relative. Once there, he took private lessons from an Englishman and enrolled in the Shūyūkan (Japanese: 修猷館, now Fukuoka Prefectural Shuyukan Senior High School in Sawara-ku) school where English was the medium of instruction and where he became proficient in his family's style of judo (随変流) and also trained in kenjutsu and iaijutsu. During judo practice, he totally defeated an opponent from Kumamoto, who then tried to kill Nakamura in revenge with a kitchen knife. In the violent encounter, Nakamura stabbed and killed his assailant with his own weapon, which was ruled legitimate self-defence, yet still got him expelled. He then joined the Gen'yōsha ultra-nationalist secret society, forming a friendship with Tōyama Mitsuru.

=== In the Imperial Japanese military ===
At the age of 16, he joined the Imperial Japanese Army and served as a covert agent in Northern China. China was reigned by the Manchu dynasty at that time. In 1902, he participated in sabotage missions and engaged enemies, at one point defeating Chinese bandits in a swordfight while wielding a cane sword, which earned him the nickname of "Tempu the Manslayer" (人斬り天風, Hitokiri Tenpu). In another instance, during the Russo-Japanese War, he was captured by Cossacks and almost executed before being rescued. He was one of only nine out of 113 military affairs investigators to return to Japan alive from the war.

=== Seeking a cure for his illness ===
After returning, he suffered a severe attack of tuberculosis at the age of 30. Inspired by reading Orison Swett Marden and seeking a cure for the illness, he traveled to the United States. In order to be granted permission to enter the country despite his illness, he claimed to be a relative of Sun Yat-sen, whom he knew personally. However, his experience with Marden was unsatisfactory. He was advised by Kenkichi Yoshizawa to enroll in Columbia University. He studied the autonomic nerves at Columbia, and traveled to England, Germany, Belgium and France. For a period of time he lived with the family of Sarah Bernhardt. In 1911, on his way back to Japan, he met an Indian yogi in Egypt named Kaliapa (a.k.a. Cariapa and Kariappa), who took him to Gorkhe, in eastern Nepal. He remained there for two and a half years of yoga study and practice, during which time his illness was cured. He practiced a variation of Raja Yoga and Karma Yoga with Kaliapa, with an emphasis on Raja Yoga.

=== Return to Japan ===
After finally returning to Japan, he served as president of Tokyo Industrial Bank, among other business activities. He established his own medical and philosophical organization in 1919, renaming it Tempūkai (Japanese: 天風会) in 1940. He taught Shinshin-tōitsu-dō to Tōhei Kōichi, who later founded Shinshin-tōitsu-aikidō.

He died in 1968, and was buried in the cemetery attached to Gokoku-ji, Tokyo. In Japan, Tempū is remembered as a prolific writer and a practitioner of philosophy and entrepreneurship.

== Tempu-Kai ==
Tempu-Kai is headquartered in Otsuka (大塚), Bunkyo-ku, Tokyo, and actively holds seminars and retreats to teach his Shinshin-tōitsu-dō. It has branches all over Japan and in Hawaii.

== His influence to Japanese leaders ==
Tempu made considerable influence to the leaders of the Japanese society in various fields. They include: Tōgō Heihachirō, Hara Takashi, Seibo Kitamura, Chiyo Uno, Futabayama Sadaji, Tatsuro Hirooka, Konosuke Matsushita, Kazuo Inamori, et al., and more recently, Shohei Ohtani.

=== People who studied under Tempu ===
- Uno Chiyo, author
- Tōgō Heihachirō, the 'Admiral Nelson of the East'
- Hara Takashi, 19th Prime Minister of Japan
- Matsushita Kōnosuke, the founder of Matsushita Electric
- Tōhei Kōichi, founder of Ki-Aikido
- Tada Hiroshi, Aikikai Aikido shihan
- Ozaki Yukio, politician
- Inamori Kazuo, founder of Kyocera Corporation
- Hirooka Tatsurō, baseball player

== Published works ==
Published works by Tempū Nakamura include these Japanese titles:

- ISBN 4-930838-55-X 成功の実現 (The Realisation of Success)
- ISBN 4-930838-59-2 盛大な人生 (A Prosperous Life)
- ISBN 4-930838-80-0 心に成功の炎を (Setting Fire to the Heart for Success)
- ISBN 4-06-263739-1 運命を拓く (Altering Fate)
- ISBN 4-06-208263-2 叡智のひびき-天風哲人箴言註釈 (Resounding Wisdom - the Annotated Maxims of Philosopher Tempū)
- ISBN 4-06-207695-0 真理のひびき-天風哲人新箴言註釈 (Resounding Truth - the Annotated Maxims of Philosopher Tempū)
- ISBN 4-930838-97-5 いつまでも若々しく生きる (Living Youthfully)
- ISBN 4-89101-020-7 君に成功を贈る (Building Your Success)
