= Harry Kiyoshi Ishisaka =

- Born: December 25, 1928; Kealakekua, Hawaii
- Died: 1978 (aged 50–51); Irvine, California
- Occupation: Aikido Sensei

Harry Kiyoshi Ishisaka (December 25, 1928 – January 1978) was an American aikido teacher. Founder of the Orange County Aiki Kai and its chief instructor until his early death, he did much to popularize the art in southern California. His obituary in Black Belt magazine described him as "one of the foremost practitioners of aikido in America."

== Early years ==
Harry Ishisaka was born in Kealakekua, Hawaii. As a child he was involved in different forms of martial arts, including sumo, kendo, judo and boxing. He attended Hilo Technical School, where he trained as a heavy-duty mechanic. He joined the U.S. Army after graduating, and spent some time with the U.S. Army in Japan. While there, he studied judo at an advanced level, and he continued his studies in this art after returning to the United States.

The Aikido master Koichi Tohei visited Hawaii in 1953, and taught Aikido to the first American pupils, people of Japanese origins such as Roy Y. Suenaka, Tukuji Hirata and Isao Takahashi. However, Ishisaka began his studies in aikido only after he had moved to Southern California. He was drawn to Aikido by the spiritual aspects of the teachings of Morihei Ueshiba, and trained in California under Koichi Tohei.

== Teacher ==
Ishisaka became one of the first wave of aikidoka in the continental U.S.A. In 1964 he founded the Westminster Aikido School, and the first Aikido classes were held in the Westminster high school. Soon after he moved to Garden Grove, California where he launched the Orange County Aiki Kai in a larger facility. Ishisaka was the chief instructor of Orange County Aikikai for the remainder of his life. Koichi Tohei supported Ishisaka in founding the Orange County Aiki Kai dojo. Ishisaka was one of Tohei's students who attended the first U.S. Ki Society organizational meeting at the California State University, Fullerton, when Tohei was breaking away from the mainstream Aikikai organisation. For a period the school was affiliated with the Ki Society International, and Ishisaka was an associate lecturer with this organization. Later Ishisaka became independent of the Ki Society.

Ishisaka was influential in the formation of Aikido societies in the University of California, Irvine and the California State University, Fullerton, and in the introduction of Aikido instruction to the Orange County Department of Mental Health. He participated in various tournaments and exhibitions. (Note: Competitions are prohibited in Aikido, which is not a fighting technique but an approach to non-resistant self defense that stresses harmony with the movements of the universe.) He taught many pupils. Jerry Glassman, who founded the HAI KI Aiki Center in Eugene, Oregon, was to accept honorary godan (5th dan) in 2000. Dan Kawakami, 6th dan, is another pupil who went on to become a well-known instructor. Perhaps his best known pupil was Steven Seagal, who began studying under Ishisaka as a teenager in the mid-1960s. A fellow student said "[Seagal] was crazy about Harry Ishisaka." Seagal continued to study at the Orange County Aikikai while making frequent visits to Japan where he studied under other masters, before moving to Japan in March 1973.

While leading the OC Aikikai, Ishisaka also held a full-time job as a machinist with a company in El Toro, California. He had risen to the rank of godan by the time of his death. Harry Ishisaka died in mid-January 1978 at the age of fifty, after suffering a heart attack during an Aikido demonstration at Irvine College, California. OC Aikikai hosts an annual Harry Ishisaka memorial seminar.

== Philosophy ==
Ishisaka considered that understanding ki, the underlying life force, was of key importance. Through ki a person can achieve a harmonious way of life that is healthy and positive. He practiced ki exercises with his students, and encouraged use of techniques such as controlled deep breathing, meditation and complete relaxation. He also saw ki as a means of anticipating the opponent's moves so they can be avoided, and even of "bending" the opponent's mind and body – leading their ki. He expressed this concept in the formula "move the mind to move the body."

== Notes and references ==
Notes

Citations

Sources

- Alzona, José Emiliano (December 1990). "Steven Seagal". Black Belt.
- "Who is Dan Kawakami?". Twisting Wrists. January 14, 2010.
- "In Harmony with the Universe: Goodbye to Harry Ishiasaka". Black Belt: 63. May 1978.
- "Instructor's Profile: Harry Ishisaka". Black Belt. May 1966.
- "Jerry Glassman". Pacific Martial Arts Conference.
- McKee, Jake (January 27, 2010). "Ishisaka sensei memorial seminar at OC Aikikai". Twisting Wrists. Archived from the original on 2010-12-24.
- Perry, Susan; Rubin, Ronald (2002-03-01). Aikido talks: conversations with American Aikidoists. Areté Press. ISBN 978-0-941736-15-2.
- Saunders, Suzanne (July 1975). "The Development of Ki". Black Belt.
- "Sensei Harry Ishisaka". Orange County Aiki Kai.
- "Steven Seagal : Aikido Article". steven-seagal.net.
- Suenaka, Roy; Watson, Christopher (1997-11-15). Complete Aikido. Tuttle Publishing. p. 80. ISBN 978-0-8048-3140-6.
- Weiser, Stanley (1997). "Steven Seagal Speaks". Shambhala Sun. Nalanda Foundation and Vajradhatu International.
