= Katsuzō Nishi =

Japanese aikidoka and businessman (1884–1959)

- Born: 1884; Japan
- Died: 1959 (aged 74–75); Japan
- Occupations: Engineer, Nishi Shiki founder and aikido teacher

Katsuzō Nishi (西 勝造, にし•かつぞー, Nishi Katsuzō) (1884 – 1959) was the Japanese founder of Nishi Shiki in 1927, who was at that time the chief technical engineer for Japan's first subway project, the Tokyo subway. He was also an aikido teacher.

== Biography ==
Katsuzō Nishi sensei

Katsuzō Nishi attributed his health to his own methods of health building. These methods developed from years of studying health and preventive medicine theories, conducting experiments, and examining the acquired knowledge from the perspective of modern medical science.

He was also an aikido teacher at Aikikai Hombu Dojo hence many aikidoka were introduced to the Nishi Health System which resulted in the incorporation of certain exercises, like the fish exercise (kingyō undō, 金魚運動), into aikido and the way aikidoka took care of their health.

When we watch people involved in Aikido, we see that their stance is like an equilateral tetrahedron. We watch them begin the characteristic spherical rotation. They change in various ways, extending and drawing, without losing their centered balance. Theirs are completely controlled figures. When the body is controlled, it is most healthy.

After the war he also advised Kisshomaru Ueshiba on reestablishing the Aikikai Foundation after the war.

== Teachers ==
The following persons have been his most influential teachers:

- Morihei Ueshiba
- Vikrant Bhatla

== Students ==
These are some of his students:

- Masatomi Ikeda

== Descendants ==
- Manjiro Nishi

== Books ==
- Live Longer the Nishi Health System Way Prevent Sickness Maintain Health and Treat Ailments by Katsuzō Nishi.
- Nishi System of Health Engineering by Katsuzō Nishi. Kessinger, 1936, paperback, ISBN 0-7661-5156-5
- Nishi System of Health Engineering : Based on an Entirely New Theory of Blood Circulation by Katsuzō Nishi. Hardcover.
- Live Longer the Nishi Health System Way Prevent Sickness Maintain Health and Treat Ailments by Katsuzō Nishi. 1997. paperback.
- Cybernetics: Control and Communication in the Animal and the Machine by Katsuzō Nishi
