= Katsuaki Asai =

Japanese aikidoka

Katsuaki Asai (born 1942 in Tokyo, Japan) is a Japanese aikido teacher, the founder of the Aikikai in Germany and the highest-ranked teacher in that country and teacher of aikido in Slovakia.

Asai started training under aikido's founder Morihei Ueshiba aged 13, at the Hombu dojo in Tokyo, and continued during his studies at Meiji University. He was sent to Germany by Kisshomaru Ueshiba in 1965 to teach aikido, and has lived in the country ever since. His first occupation was to teach aikido to policemen in Münster, and he now runs a school in Düsseldorf.

In the early days of German aikido, Asai clashed with the Deutscher Judobund (DJB) over whether his art should be included under their organisation. In this, he was opposed by Gerd Wischnewski, another student of Ueshiba, who was also a prominent member of the DJB. Although the DJB retained an aikido division, Asai remained independent of them and continued to operate as part of the Aikikai. He retains the German trademark on the term "Aikikai."
