= Natsuki Ikeda =

Japanese Tarento, actress, and former gravure idol

- 池田 夏希
- Born: Miki Omori; 24 June 1987 (age 38); Chiba Prefecture, Japan
- Other names: Nakkī (ナッキー)
- Occupations: Actress; tarento; gravure idol (formerly)
- Years active: 2000–
- Agent: Central
- Height: 172 cm (5 ft 8 in)

Natsuki Ikeda (池田 夏希, Ikeda Natsuki; born 24 June 1987, in Chiba Prefecture) is a Japanese female tarento, actress, and former gravure idol.

She used to be represented by the talent agency, Artist-house Pyramid, but after working as a freelancer, she currently is represented by Central.

== Biography ==
She graduated from the Hinode Girls High School.

In 2000, when she was a junior high school student, she debuted in the entertainment industry as a junior idol by belonging to Five Eight under her real name Miki Omori (大森 美希, Ōmori Miki).

In 2008, she re-debuted with her stage name Natsuki Ikeda and moved to Artist-house Pyramid. Since then, she has been active mainly in magazine gravure and variety shows.

According to her blog on 2 December 2015, she left Artist-house Pyramid in the summer of the same year, and revealed that she became a freelancer after that.

Later on, she reported in a 2017 blog post that she became affiliated with Central, graduated from gravure idol activities, and turned into an actress.

== Personal life ==
- Her hobby is playing with her dog. Her special skill is swimming.
- She has an elder sister who is three years older.
- She has a best friend from her high school days.

== Filmography ==
=== Main TV programmes ===
Dates	Title	Network	Notes
2006	Gal Circle	NTV	In the name Miki Omori
7 May 2008	Shūkan PuraChike!	KTV	
9 May 2008	Untouchable no Makimaki de yatte miyou!!	ABC	Monthly
2 Oct 2008 – 2 Sep 2009	Pyramid Girls	Enta! 371	#43–54; main MC
Apr 2010 – Mar 2011	Impact	CBC	
8 Apr – 23 Sep 2009	Rabo Meister	CX	
4 Oct 2009 –	371! Fight Pyramid Girls	Enta! 371	#01&ndash (updated twice a month)
10 Oct 2009 –	BS Brunch	BS-TBS	
3 Jan 2010	Sheiken Baby	CX	
3 Mar 2010	Gaikōkan: Kosaku Kuroda	CX	Episode 8
13 Jul 2011 –	P-1 Gold Rush	TVO	As Sexy Sheriff (about once every two months)
25 Dec 2011	Megami Kōrin	Mondo TV	
Jan 2013 – Mar 2014	Otsu Apuri@	Niconico Live Broadcast	
3 Apr 2013 –	Audrey no Kami Apuri@Shinseki -Up Date-	TX	As Goddess Demeteru
24 Jan 2014	Yamikin Ushijima-kun: Season 2	MBS	
7 Jun 2014	Doki'! Marugoto Mizugi Onna-darake no Suiei Taikai	Fuji TV One	
28 Oct 2014	Ken Shimura no Baka Tonosama: Aki no Dai Shūkaku-sai SP!!	CX	Female servant
13 Jan 2015	Ken Shimura no Baka Tonosama: Shinshun Bakushō Special!!	CX	Female servant
1 Apr 2015	Ken Shimura no Baka Tonosama: April Fool Special!!	CX	Female servant

=== School festivals ===
Date	Title	Location	Notes
8 Nov 2009	Waseda Festival 2009 WHK × Omoshiroi Hito ga Suki	Okuma Auditorium front main stage	11:55–

=== Stage ===
Date	Title	Location	Notes
4–8 Aug 2010	Neppū Suteki Butai Vol.6 Value na Jikan	Eyepitte Mejiro	
9–10 Mar 2011	Hyōryū Geki	Air Studio	
21–25 Sep 2011	Place: Tokubetsu-han –Uminoya kari chaimashita–	Aqua Studio	
1–3 Feb 2013	Be With Double Face Theater Ashes and Diamonds: Rouge	Wasal Theater	
Jul, Aug 2014	Shimura Tamashī: Dai 9-kai Kōen -Ichihimenitarō San kabocha-	Tennozu Ginga Theater, Chunichi Theater, Meiji-za	(Note: She joined the Shimura Family based on this stage.)
3–7 Dec 2014	Utsuro no Hime to Gaijū no Mori	Shinjuku Village Live	
Aug 2015	Shimura Tamashī: Dai 10-kai Kōen -Ichihimenitarō San kabocha-	Chunichi Theater, Meiji-za	
Feb 2016	Ken Shimura Emi	Kanagawa Prefectural Hall, Nitori Cultural Hall	

=== Films ===
Date	Title	Role	Notes	Ref.
Apr 2011	Tōsō-chū: Satsujin Hunter	Kōshi	Distributed by Jolly Roger co., ltd	
26 Mar 2017	Kūga no Shiro: Joshi Keimusho	Saeko Kitazawa	Directed by Wataru Oku	

=== Direct-to-video ===
Date	Title	Role	Director
May 2017	Kūga no Shiro: Joshi Keimusho 2	Saeko Kitazawa	Wataru Oku

== Works ==
=== DVD ===
As Miki Omori

Year	Title
2004	Super na Shōjo 58! Vol.2 Miki Omori & Momoko Shibuya
2005	Labyrinth

As Natsuki Ikeda

Date	Title	Publisher
28 Jun 2008	Taiyō no Hitomi	Shinyusha
20 Sep 2008	Horizon	Line Communications
22 Dec 2008	Morning Glory	E-Net Frontier
28 Feb 2009	sweet jewel	Shinyusha
23 May 2009	Chura Koi	Gakken
26 Aug 2009	Natsu no Iro	Ayumi Hall Publishing
21 Nov 2009	Swinution	Toriko
27 Feb 2010	Venus	Shinyusha
22 May 2010	Summer Dream –Natsuki no Yūwaku–	Toriko
20 Aug 2010	Syakunatu	Line Communications
26 Nov 2010	Natsu o Dakishimete	Gurasso
25 Feb 2011	Hot Issue	Takeshobo
20 May 2011	colorful	E-Net Frontier
27 Aug 2011	Dearest	Shinyusha
25 Nov 2011	Luxury	Gurasso
24 Feb 2012	Dark Side	M.B.D Media Brand
25 May 2012	Shōgeki	Gurasso
31 Aug 2012	Natsu Shin Enbi	S Digital
23 Nov 2012	Gokujō-bi no Kyōen	M.B.D Media Brand
28 Feb 2013	Gochōran	Gurasso
24 May 2013	Shinpi Yūwaku	M.B.D Media Brand
30 Aug 2013	Shūkaheigetsu	Gurasso
29 Nov 2013	Suhada no Natsuki	Gurasso
28 Feb 2014	Natsukipai	Gurasso
30 May 2014	Kyakusenbi	Gurasso
29 Aug 2014	Mōsō Yūgi	Gurasso
28 Nov 2014	Genten Kaiki	Gurasso
27 Feb 2015	Bikyaku Collection	Gurasso
22 May 2015	Kairaku no Kairō –Kimi to Fure Au Toki–	E-Net Frontier
28 Aug 2015	Himi no Hanazono	Gurasso

=== Digital photos+movie work collections ===
Date	Title	Photographer	Publisher
5 Aug 2011	Summer Girl	Isao Nakamura	Fan Plus G The Television Plus Delivery

== Bibliography ==
=== Photo albums ===
Date	Title	Publisher	Photographer	ISBN
Jul 2008	Taiyō no Hitomi	Shinyusha	Akihito Saijo	ISBN 978-4883807932
Sep 2008	Princess Of Sunrise	Aqua House	Hiroyoshi Saiki	ISBN 978-4860461164
Dec 2008	sweet jewel	Shinyusha	Shinichiro Koike	ISBN 978-4883808939
Mar 2009	Chura Koi	Gakken	Masafumi Nakayama	ISBN 978-4-054039889
Jun 2009	Natsu no Iro	Ayumi Hall Publishing	Koji Inomoto	ISBN 978-4-775604038
Oct 2009	Magical Sexy Tour	Shogakukan	Naoki Rakuman	ISBN 978-4091030788
Jun 2010	Gekkan: Natsuki Ikeda	Shinchosha	Chikashi Kasai	ISBN 978-4107902191
