= Imaizumi Brings All the Gals to His House =

Japanese manga series

- Cover of the first volume of the all-ages spinoff

今泉ん家はどうやらギャルの溜まり場になってるらしい (Imaizumin-chi wa Dōyara Gyaru no Tamariba ni Natteru Rashii)
- Genre: Romantic comedy
- Manga

Imaizumi Brings All the Gyarus to His House
- Written by: Gorō Nori
- Published by: Self-published
- English publisher: Irodori Comics
- Original run: April 8, 2019 – present
- Volumes: 7
- Original video animation
- Directed by: Ken Raika
- Studio: T-Rex
- Released: August 6, 2021 – January 30, 2026
- Episodes: 6
- Manga
- Written by: Gorō Nori
- Published by: Takeshobo
- English publisher: NA: Seven Seas Entertainment
- Imprint: Bamboo Comics
- Magazine: Web Comic Gamma Plus
- Original run: March 25, 2022 – present
- Volumes: 10

Imaizumi Brings All the Gals to His House (今泉ん家はどうやらギャルの溜まり場になってるらしい, Imaizumin-chi wa Dōyara Gyaru no Tamariba ni Natteru Rashii) is a Japanese manga series written and illustrated by Gorō Nori. It began as a hentai doujinshi series in April 2019, with Nori releasing seven volumes as of June 2025. A hentai original video animation (OVA) adaptation of the doujinshi animated by T-Rex was released from August 2021 to August 2023. An all-ages spinoff manga in continuity with the doujinshi began serialization on Takeshobo's Web Comic Gamma Plus service in March 2022, and has been compiled into ten tankōbon volumes as of July 2026.

== Plot ==
Keita Imaizumi, a high school student, currently lives alone. When three gyaru (gal) schoolmates, Reina Hamasaki, Ruri Kurumizaka, and Yukina Sasaki, find out about this, they start visiting his house on a regular basis and hanging out with him. Some time later, he has sex with all three, leading to the three moving in with him. The four aim to continue being close physically, while keeping their relationship secret at school.

== Characters ==
Keita Imaizumi (今泉 慶太, Imaizumi Keita)
A high school student who is currently living alone as his family wants him to learn to be independent. After forming a relationship with the three girls, they start living with him.
Reina Hamasaki (浜崎 レイナ, Hamasaki Reina)
A gyaru who comes to live with Keita. She works as a magazine model.
Ruri Kurumizaka (胡桃坂 ルリ, Kurumizaka Ruri)
A gyaru who comes to live with Keita.
Yukina Sasaki (佐々木 ユキナ, Sasaki Yukina)
A gyaru who comes to live with Keita. She also works as a magazine model, having been scouted after Reina's older sister posted a picture of her online.
Mari Tsutsumi (津々見 真理, Tsutsumi Mari)
A glasses-wearing girl who admires Ruri. She calls herself her servant.

== Media ==
=== Manga ===
Written by Gorō Nori, Imaizumi Brings All the Gals to His House began as an pornographic doujinshi series on April 8, 2019 until October 24, 2026. An all-ages spinoff manga which takes place in between the doujinshi series (which itself remains ongoing) began serialization on Takeshobo's Web Comic Gamma Plus service on March 25, 2022, and has been compiled into ten tankōbon volumes as of July 2026. The serialization's Japanese title is identical to the doujinshi except for having "~DEEP~" added at the end. The original doujinshi series is licensed in English by Irodori Comics under the title Imaizumi Brings All the Gyarus to His House, while the all-ages spinoff uses the spelling Gals in the title and is licensed by Seven Seas Entertainment.

==== All-ages spinoff ====
No.	Original release date	Original ISBN	North American release date	North American ISBN
1	October 17, 2022	978-4-8019-7845-4	December 10, 2024	979-8-89160-735-4
1. Imaizumi-kun and Hamasaki-san; 2. Imaizumi-kun and Kurumizaka-san; 3. Imaizumi-kun and Sasaki-san; 4. Imaizumi-kun's Budgeting Issues; 5. The Cost of Changing a Credit Card Plan; 3.5 Girls' Talk
2	April 17, 2023	978-4-8019-8030-3	March 11, 2025	979-8-89160-901-3
6. A Thoughful, Caring Spirit; 7. Imaizumi-kun's Total-Body Makeover Plan; 8. Ball Sports Day (Part 1); 9. Ball Sports Day (Part 2); 10. Half-Naked Life? Screw That, Set The Girls Free!; 10.5 Wash My Back for Me, Imaizumi-kun!
3	October 17, 2023	978-4-8019-8175-1	July 15, 2025	979-8-89373-004-3
11. A Mother's Surprise Attack; 12. Step-By-Step; 13. Secret Dealings of The Idol Research Club - Mission 36; 14. Moving; 15. Lisa-nee Has Entered The Room; 12.5 Cop a Feel, Imaizumi-kun!
4	February 17, 2024	978-4-8019-8264-2	November 11, 2025	979-8-89373-642-7
16. How Long Have You Had Your Eye on Him?; 17. You And The Beach at Sunset; 18. Dealing With an Out-of-Control Yukina; 19. You'll Catch My Cold; 20. Breakfast With Everyone; 18.1 That's What You Like, Imaizumi-kun?!
5	July 17, 2024	978-4-8019-8355-7	March 10, 2026	979-8-89373-643-4
21. Confusing Imaizumi's Mom!; 22. Imaizumi-kun's Growth; 23. Bunny & Bunny & Bunny!; 24. Imaizumi, You Are Hereby Sentenced to Tickling!; 25. Rock Paper Scissors to Decide the Lawful Wife!; 25.5 What Really Happened to Imaizumi-kun?!
6	December 17, 2024	978-4-8019-8511-7	July 7, 2026	979-8-89561-766-3
26. Imaizumi Wants to Give Presents; 27. Forever by Your Side; 28. HNY! Let's Have a Great One!; 24. A Secret Relationship; 25. A Leisurely Sunday Morning; 30.1 A Leisurely Sunday Morning With Some Extras
7	April 16, 2025	978-4-8019-8625-1	November 10, 2026	979-8-89765-270-9
31. Bluuuuuuurgh!!; 32. Pajama Party at Imaizumi's!; 33. Hamasaki-san has a Makeover!; 34. One Rainy Night; 35. Second-Years; 33.9 Sleep Alreadyy, Imaizumi-kun!
8	September 17, 2025	978-4-8019-8766-1	—	—
9	February 17, 2026	978-4-8019-8881-1	—	—
10	July 16, 2026	978-4-8019-9012-8; 978-4-8019-9013-5 (SE)	—	—

=== Anime ===
A hentai original video animation (OVA) adaptation animated by T-Rex and directed by Ken Raika was released from August 6, 2021, to January 30, 2026.
