= Roderick Kobayashi =

American aikido teacher

Roderick T. Kobayashi (January 7, 1932 – June 17, 1995) was an American aikido teacher and founder of Seidokan Aikido. He is one of the teachers profiled in the book Aikido in America.

Kobayashi was born in Hawaii and raised in Japan by his grandfather. His father was instrumental in helping to bring Koichi Tohei to Hawaii in order to introduce the art to the United States in 1953. He got his early training starting in 1957 under Yukiso Yamamoto, Kazuto Sugimoto, and Isao Takahashi in Hawaii, and under Tohei in Japan. Kobayashi received the ranks of shodan (1st degree) in 1962, nidan (2nd degree) in 1965, and sandan (3rd degree) in 1966. He became a full-time professional instructor in 1968, and was promoted to being one of only two foreign members of the instruction staff at the Aikikai Hombu Dojo.

After returning to the US, Kobayashi joined the Physical Education Dept. of California State University at Fullerton as a lecturer in 1972, where he began teaching aikido classes. When Tohei broke away from the Aikikai to devote himself to the Ki Society in 1974, Kobayashi followed him into the new organization, as chief instructor for the Western USA, ranked 6th dan in Shin Shin Toitsu Aikido. He resigned from the Ki Society in 1981, at which time he founded the Seidokan style and organization.

Kobayashi died at his home in Downey, California in 1995 at the age of 63.
