= Shodan =

Shodan may refer to:

- Shodan (rank), the term of rank used in Japanese martial arts and the game of Go
- SHODAN, the antagonist of the video game series System Shock
- Shodan (website), a search engine to find computers connected to the internet, named after the video game character
- Villa Shodhan, a building in Ahmedabad, Gujarat, India
