= Hiroshi Tada =

Japanese aikidoka (born 1929)

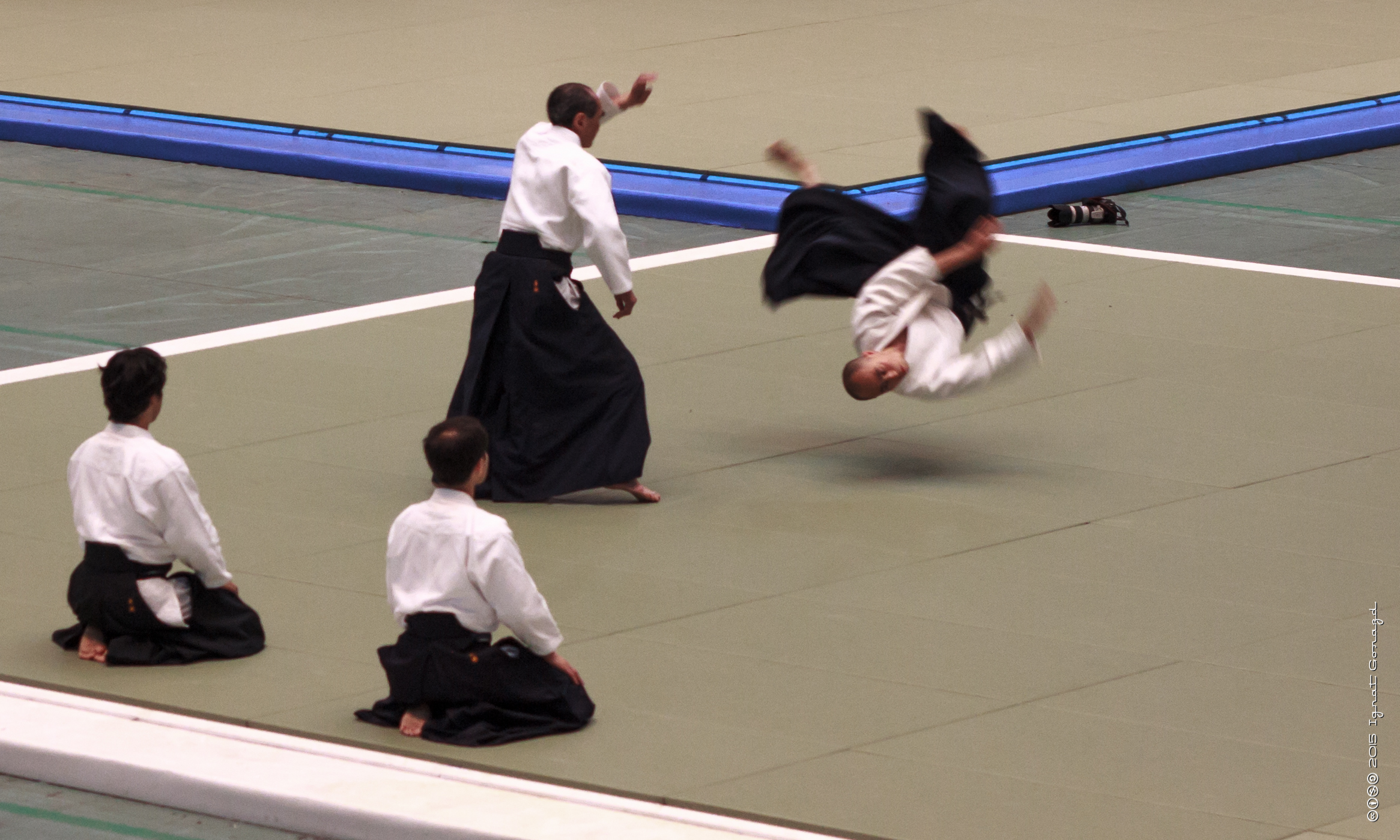
- Tada performing at the 53rd All Japan Aikido Demonstration
- Born: December 14, 1929 (age 96); Japan
- Native name: 多田 宏 Tada Hiroshi
- Style: Aikido; Aikikai
- Trainer: in alphabetical order: Gichin Funakoshi; Nakamura Tempu; Morihei Ueshiba
- Rank: 9th dan Aikikai

Other information
- Occupation: shihan
- Notable students: Masatomi Ikeda

Hiroshi Tada (多田 宏, Tada Hiroshi) (born December 14, 1929) is a Japanese aikido teacher holding the rank of 9th dan in the Aikikai.

Born in Tokyo within a former Samurai family with roots from Tsushima Island, Tada first studied his family's style of archery (Heki-Ryū Chikurin-ha Ban-pa) under his father in the family's house in Jiyūgaoka. He then became a member of the Waseda University karate club before starting training in aikido at the Aikikai Hombu Dojo under aikido founder Morihei Ueshiba in March 1950. He was dispatched to Rome, Italy, in 1964 where he established the Italian Dojo Centrale in 1967, and the national association Aikikai d'Italia in 1970. He returned to Japan in 1971 to resume teaching at the Aikikai Hombu Dojo.

To supplement aikido training, he has developed a system of breathing and meditative exercises called ki no renma (気の錬磨, cultivation of ki) based largely on the teachings of Nakamura Tempu and the Ichikukai Dojo.
