= Gorkhe =

Gorkhe गोर्खे गाविस
- Village Development Committee
- Location in Nepal
- Coordinates: 26°57′N 88°04′E
- Country: Nepal
- Province: Province No. 1
- District: Ilam District

Population (1991)
  - Total: 4,889
- Time zone: UTC+5:45 (Nepal Time)

Gorkhe is a town and Village Development Committee in Ilam District in the Province No. 1 of eastern Nepal. At the time of the 1991 Nepal census it had a population of 4,889 persons living in 889 individual households.
