= Koichi Tohei =

Japanese martial artist (1920–2011)

Kōichi Tōhei
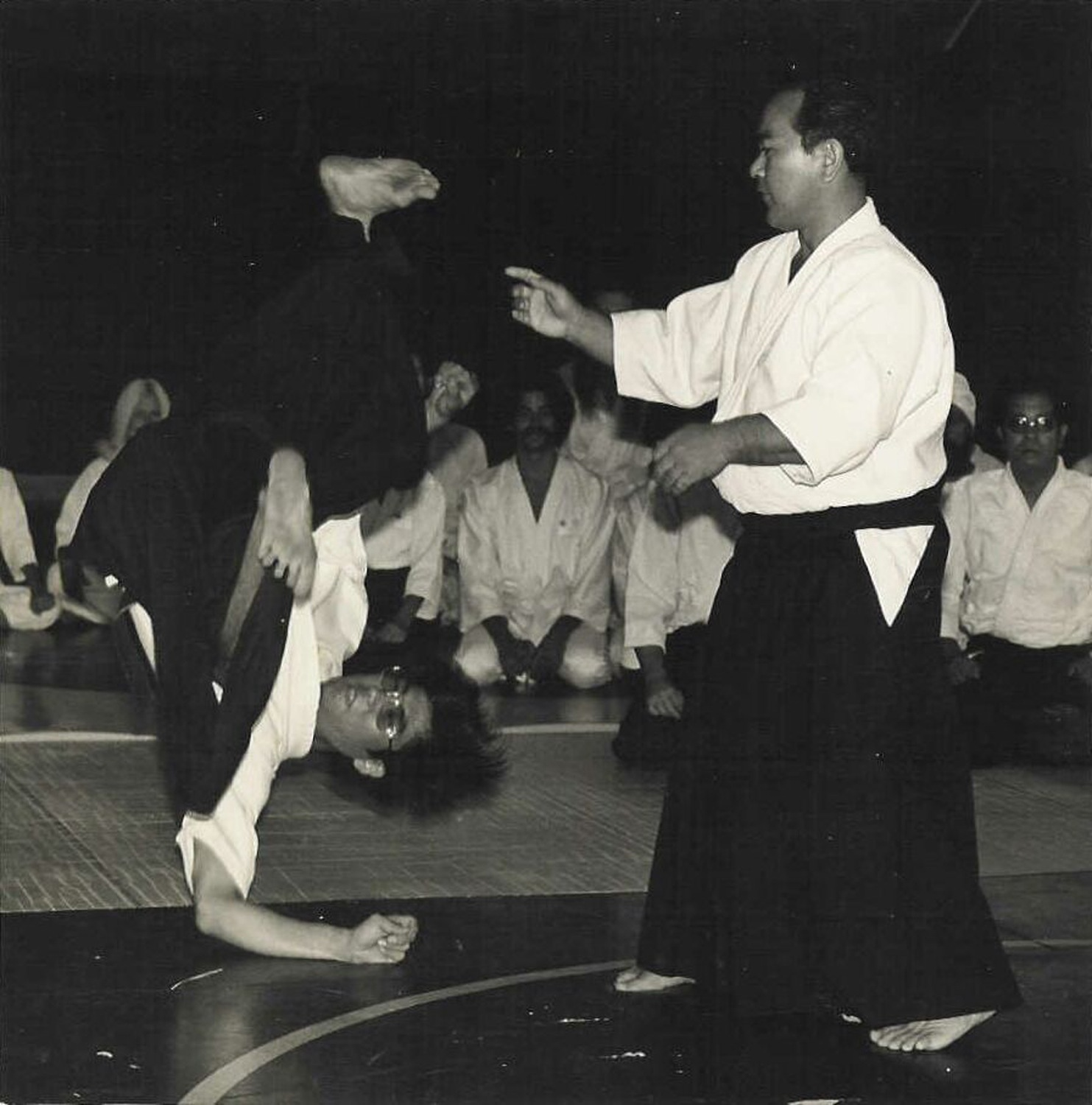
- Tohei demonstrating Aikido with Jon Takagi at Arizona State University in 1974.
- Born: 20 January 1920; Shitaya, Tokyo, Japan
- Died: 19 May 2011 (aged 91); Tokyo, Japan
- Native name: 藤平光一 Tōhei Kōichi
- Style: Shin Shin Toitsu Aikido (founder)

Koichi Tohei (藤平光一, Tōhei Kōichi) (20 January 1920 – 19 May 2011) was a 10th Dan aikidoka and founder of the Ki Society and its style of aikido, officially Shin Shin Toitsu Aikido (literally "aikido with mind and body unified"), but commonly known as Ki-Aikido.

== Aikido ==
Koichi Tohei was born 1920 in Shitaya ward (下谷区), presently Taitō, in Tokyo and graduated from the Economics Department of Keio University. As a boy he was sickly and frail, leading his father to recommend Tohei for judo studies. He trained hard and his body prospered, but soon after he began his pre-college studies at Keio University, he developed a case of pleurisy. This forced Tohei to take a year off.

Tohei was distressed at the thought of losing his newfound strength of body and his means of training it, so he decided to replace his judo studies with Zen meditation and misogi exercises, learned at the Ichikukai Dojo in Tokyo. As with his judo studies, Tohei entered the training of the mind with fervor and soon excelled despite his serious health issues. After his recovery from pleurisy, Tohei became convinced that it was his efforts in training his mind and cultivating his ki that had helped him to heal and recover. This stimulated his later development of Kiatsu, a system of treating physical illness by pressing with the fingers and extending the ki into the ill person's body. Tohei describes this as "priming the pump" allowing the person to heal themselves.

After recovering from pleurisy he returned to judo, but Tohei wanted more than just physical training and did not think that judo was the right art for him to practise, although he did continue studying judo until he started aikido.

In 1940, when he was 19, Tohei's judo instructor, Shohei Mori, recommended that Tohei meet with the founder of aikido, Morihei Ueshiba.

According to Tohei, when he first met with an aikido instructor and practiced some techniques at the Ueshiba dojo, he had doubts about aikido and its value to him. That changed when Ueshiba entered the dojo and started to perform his techniques on the instructors. Tohei was still not entirely convinced until Ueshiba asked Tohei to step onto the mat and try to grab him. Tohei's attempts were unsuccessful, and after this personal demonstration by Ueshiba, Tohei asked to enroll on the spot. Tohei continued to train his mind as well as his body with meditation, misogi and aikido.

Tohei trained with Ueshiba for six months before being sent as a representative (dairi) to teach at the Shumei Okawa school and the military police academy. This was before Tohei was ranked as either dan or kyu. Ueshiba presented Tohei with the rank of 5th dan after Tohei had begun his military service.

== War years ==
In 1942, Koichi Tohei graduated from the Economics Department of Keio University. In February 1944, after receiving military training, he was sent leading an infantry unit into occupied China. There he understood, under enemy fire, the importance of calming one's mind in the One Point in the lower abdomen ("seika no itten"). Because of the lack of doctors, Tohei developed during the war the principles of what he later named Kiatsu Therapy, based on sending Ki through the fingertips. He saw action in China and was stranded there at the end of the war until his repatriation in 1946. Tohei stated on several occasions that Ki principles such as "extend Ki" and "relax completely" leaving things up to the Universe helped him to stay safe during the war, along with the eighty men under his command.

== Post-war years ==
In 1948, Kisshomaru Ueshiba, person in charge of Aikido's development in Tokyo at the time, married Tohei's wife's younger sister. Beginning in 1953 Tohei was responsible for the introduction of aikido to the West, mainly through regular teaching journeys to Hawaii, but also the continental United States and Europe. Kisshomaru Ueshiba wrote that Tohei, then 8th dan, "traveled to Hawaii in 1953 staying through 1954 in an effort to spread aikido". In 1961 Tohei and Nobuyoshi Tamura accompanied Morihei Ueshiba on his visit to Hawaii. Hawaii became a center for the spread of aikido in the United States, and remains an important place for Ki-Aikido.

In September 1959, while chief instructor of the Hombu Dojo, Tohei published his first book, Shashin Kaisetsu Aikido (Aikido Through Photos), with Toto Shobo in Tokyo.

During his years at the Aikikai, Tohei taught many instructors who later became senior teachers, including Hiroshi Tada, Sadateru Arikawa, Seigo Yamaguchi, Shigenobu Okumura, Kazuo Chiba, Yoshimitsu Yamada and Steven Seagal. Robert Nadeau, who trained at the Hombu Dojo from 1962 to 1964, recalled taking private lessons from Tohei and described him as "a very good teacher" and, as head teacher, "a dominant force" who corrected the younger instructors.

In 1969, Tohei was asked by Ueshiba to accept the new rank of 10th dan, which Tohei accepted, after having previously refused the same offer. The top rank in aikido had been 8th dan originally, but the ranks were expanded by Kisshomaru Ueshiba and Kisaburo Osawa for political reasons; Gozo Shioda of Yoshinkan Aikido had been awarded the rank of 9th Dan by Ueshiba in 1961. Tohei's promotions, from 5th dan in 1952 onward, came during a period when Ueshiba mostly did not oversee the technical and administrative management of aikido in Tokyo.

== Creation of the Ki no Kenkyukai ==
The death of Morihei Ueshiba in 1969 brought tensions between Tohei and the Aikikai, the main aikido organization, to a head. Ueshiba's son Kisshomaru Ueshiba inherited the title of Doshu. At the time of Ueshiba's death, Tohei was chief instructor of the Hombu Dojo, the headquarters of the Aikikai, a title he retained until his official split from the Aikikai in 1974.

A central point of conflict was Tohei's emphasis on ki in aikido. He wanted aikido to focus on ki principles, using exercises to both cultivate and test ki in daily practice. He had already begun teaching these ideas in his own classes at the Hombu Dojo, but most of the other instructors did not adopt them. Some agreed with Tohei's approach, but Kisshomaru and most of the senior instructors opposed it and asked him not to teach his principles and techniques in the Hombu Dojo. Tohei replied that he had the right to teach them outside the Hombu Dojo, which he did. According to Shizuo Imaizumi, in the summer of 1971 Tohei announced that he would teach ki principles to people outside the Hombu Dojo after dojo officials rejected his proposal to hold ki classes there.

But the tensions remained among the senior cadre of instructors, who still did not approve of Tohei's focus upon ki. These brewing tensions together with Tohei's general dissatisfaction with the situation culminated in 1971 when he created the Ki No Kenkyukai, with the purpose of promoting the development and cultivation of ki inside aikido, but outside the Aikikai "umbrella". The years of conflict finally cemented Tohei's decision to break away from the Aikikai and teach his own 'ki' style of aikido. On 1 May 1974, Koichi Tohei officially left the Aikikai organization to concentrate on his newly created Ki-aikido and Ki-society.

On 15 May 1974, Tohei sent a letter in English and Japanese to the majority of the dojos both in Japan and abroad, explaining his reasons for the breakaway and his plans involving Ki-aikido and the Ki-society. This breakup came as a shock to many aikidoka throughout the dojos of the world. Tohei was well regarded by many instructors and students. He was seen as the foremost sensei of Aikido after Ueshiba's death. This, in turn, led to several dojos breaking with the Aikikai and joining Tohei in his new style. In Northern California, for example, Rod Kobayashi, who had been connected with Tohei and was the senior-ranked teacher in the state, went with him in 1974. Tohei's new objective was to coordinate all the dojos who joined him and incorporate them into the organization of Shin Shin Toitsu Aikido: "Aikido with Mind and Body Coordinated". This branch of aikido is still active today even though Tohei himself retired from the day-to-day business of the Ki-aikido section and then concentrated solely on the Ki-society and further personal development of ki.

=== Notable students ===
Both before and during his position as head instructor at the Hombu Dojo, Tohei instructed many notable aikidoka. Several of these have since made lasting impacts on aikido in general.

Among these are (in alphabetical order):

- Christopher Curtis, 8th Dan, Chief Instructor, Hawaii Ki Federation, Ki Society Advisor, Europe
- Frank Doran, 8th Dan, founder of Aikido West and co-founder of the California Aikido Association, who trained under Tohei at the Hombu Dojo from 1962.
- Shizuo Imaizumi, 7th Dan Shin Shin Toitsu Aikido, who founded the independent Shin Budo Kai style of aikido.
- Harry Kiyoshi Ishisaka, founder of the Orange County Aiki Kai in California in 1964
- Roderick Kobayashi, 6th Dan, founder of Seidokan Aikido.
- Koretoshi Maruyama, former Chief Instructor and President of Ki Society, who has since founded the independent Aikido Yuishinkai style of aikido.
- Shuji Maruyama, founder of Kokikai Aikido
- Robert Nadeau, 8th Dan, head of Division 3 of the California Aikido Association, who took private lessons from Tohei at the Hombu Dojo in the early 1960s.
- Alan Ruddock, 6th Dan, introduced Aikido to Ireland, founder of the Aiki no Michi.
- David Shaner, 8th Dan, Chief Instructor, Eastern Ki Federation, Ki Society Advisor, the Eastern Europe/Russia Ki-Aikido
- Robert (Bob) Tann, a Marine Corps instructor who trained under Tohei in Honolulu and later taught aikido in San Diego and South San Francisco, where his students included Frank Doran and Robert Nadeau.
- Roy Y. Suenaka, 8th Dan, founder of Wadokai Aikido
- Shin'ichi Suzuki, 9th Dan, Head Instructor, Maui Ki Aikido Federation
- Jon Mamoru Takagi, 6th Dan, founder of Arizona Aikikai.
- Fumio Toyoda, 6th Dan, founder of the Aikido Association of America and Aikido Association International.

== Death ==
Tohei died at 9:14 AM, Japan time (GMT +9) on 19 May 2011, after two weeks of being admitted in hospital due to a discomfort in his chest which proved to be inflammation in the lungs. Wataru Hatakeyama, of the Ki Society Headquarters, stated "he went to intensive-care unit (ICU) twice and came back to general ward each time with his strength of Ki, however, his heart got weak little by little this morning and he passed away."

== Books by Koichi Tohei ==
- Tohei, Koichi (1959). 写真解説合気道 [Aikido Through Photos] (in Japanese). Tokyo: Toto Shobo – via National Diet Library.
- Tohei, Koichi (1964). 生活の中の合気道 [Aikido in Daily Life] (in Japanese). Tokyo: Rikugei Shobo – via National Diet Library.
- Tohei, Koichi (1966). Aikido in Daily Life. Tokyo: Rikugei Publishing House – via Open Library.
- Tohei, Koichi (1960). Aikido. Tokyo: Rikugei Publishing House – via Open Library.
- Tohei, Koichi (1962). What is Aikido?. Tokyo: Rikugei Publishing House. OCLC 612302 – via Open Library.
- Tohei, Koichi (1975). This is Aikido, With Mind and Body Coordinated. Tokyo: Japan Publications. ISBN 0-87040-346-X. OCLC 500581836 – via Open Library.
- Tohei, Koichi (1976). The Book of Ki: Coordinating Mind and Body in Daily Life. Japan Publications. ISBN 0-87040-379-6 – via Open Library.
- Tohei, Koichi (1983). Kiatsu. Japan Publications. ISBN 0-87040-536-5. OCLC 9991847 – via Open Library.
- Tohei, Koichi (1978). Ki in Daily Life. Japan Publications Trading Co. / Ki No Kenkyukai. ISBN 0-87040-436-9 – via Open Library. (Note: A 2001 edition was published by Japan Publications Trading, ISBN 4-88996-071-6.)
- Tohei, Koichi (1981). 気と生活 [Ki in Daily Life] (in Japanese). Tokyo: Ki No Kenkyukai – via National Diet Library. (Note: Reprinted 2009, ISBN 978-4-905673-10-1.)
- Tohei, Koichi (1999). 氣の確立：中村天風と植芝盛平 [The Establishment of Ki: Tempu Nakamura and Morihei Ueshiba] (in Japanese). Tokyo: Toyo Keizai Shinposha. ISBN 4-492-04117-6 – via National Diet Library.
- Tohei, Koichi (1996). 気を出す「実践ガイド」 [Extend Ki: A Practical Guide] (in Japanese). Tokyo: Nikkan Kogyo Shinbunsha. ISBN 4-526-03888-1 – via National Diet Library.
- Tohei, Koichi (2001). The Way to Union with Ki: Aikido with Mind and Body Coordination – via National Diet Library. (Note: Japanese edition 氣に合するの道, Ki-Aikido Products, 2009, ISBN 978-4-905673-15-6.)
- Tohei, Koichi (2005). 氣の呼吸法 [Ki Breathing Methods] (in Japanese). Tokyo: Gentosha. ISBN 4-344-00766-2 – via National Diet Library.

== Notes ==
Preceded by (none)	Soshu of Ki Society; 1971–2011	Succeeded by Shinichi Tohei
Preceded by Morihei Ueshiba	de facto Dōjōcho of Aikikai Hombu Dojo; 1969–1974	Succeeded by Kisshomaru Ueshiba (de jure)
