= Ki Aikido =

Japanese martial art

Shin Shin Toitsu Aikido (心身統一合氣道) or Ki Aikido (氣合氣道) is a Japanese gendai budo (contemporary martial art). It is one of the arts derived from the original Aikido, appearing after the founder's death in 1969. Ki Aikido started in 1971 with the creation of the Ki No Kenkyūkai (known in English as Ki Society) by Koichi Tohei, while he was still Chief Instructor at the Aikikai Hombu Dojo. Eventually Tohei split from the Aikikai in 1974 to focus full time on his new organization. This martial art focuses on mind and body coordination and is based on aikido techniques and Japanese yoga and promote non-violent conflict solving and self-development.

Tohei was taught Shinshin-tōitsu-dō (also known as 'Japanese yoga') by Tempu Nakamura. He felt that Tempu's teaching and explanation made clear what Morihei Ueshiba was able to do in his aikido (particularly the idea that the mind moves the body). As a result he started bringing in exercises from Shinshin-tōitsu-dō, such as 'unbendable arm' and 'unraisable body' into his aikido teaching. He started to do this as Chief Instructor of the Aikikai, while Morihei Ueshiba was still alive. He also felt the concepts of Shinshin-tōitsu-dō were more clearly applicable to daily life. It was later that he formalised his style, including leaving out some aikido techniques that he felt were ineffective against a partner who could coordinate mind and body. Although Tohei gave the Ki Development aspect of his style the name Shinshin-tōitsu-dō, it only covered part of Tempu's teaching, and included some of his own modifications.

The teaching of Ki Aikido has been split between different federations, each reflecting the experience of their respective founders: the Ki Society under Koichi Tohei and later his son Shin'ichi Tohei, Ki no Kenkyukai Internationale Association under Kenjiro Yoshigasaki, Ki Federation of Great Britain under Kenneth Williams and more recently Shin Shin Aikido under Peter Hughes (8th Dan), a long-standing teacher in the Ki Federation of Great Britain. The Shin Shin Aikido Association was incorporated as a non-profit company in 2024 and has clubs in England, Wales and France.

== Ki Aikido features ==
Each federation has evolved its own set, but some common features are:

- Emphasis on aikido principles, ki (or coordination of mind and body ) principles
- Kata (bokken, jo, tanto)
- Warmups with "ki development exercises", "coordination of mind and body", with some moves re-used during aikido techniques
- Teaching putting emphasis on "ki" (roughly translated by "energy, spirit, will, health") and its development, derived from Shinshin-tōitsu-dō teachings.
- Ki class (or Shinshin-tōitsu-dō class), aikido class
- Ki tests
- Kyu/dan grades system (similar to other gendai budo), ki exam, aikido exam
- Kiatsu (massage/healing method by transmitting ki developed by Tohei)
- Aikido technique standing, kneeling, with one or more persons, randori
- Defenses against jo, tanto, bokken
- Kokyu Dosa (呼吸動作), exercises done in seiza to break a partner balance
- Breathing exercises ("Ki Breathing")
- Concept of "one point" (臍下の一点) seika no itten, close to the hara or tanden in traditional Japanese martial arts

=== 4 principles for mind and body coordination ===
- Keep one point
- Relax completely
- Keep weight underside / Have a light feeling (variation)
- Extend Ki

These principles guide the practitioners to keep "mind and body" coordinated and can be applied in daily life (walking, pushing a door, handling a conflict, ...). To follow one is to follow all. To lose one is to lose all.

=== 5 principles for aikido ===
- Ki is extending
- Know your partner's mind
- Respect your partner's ki
- Put yourself in your partner's place
- Lead with confidence

These principles also guide the practitioners, when doing aikido techniques. They roughly represent the ideal state of mind of the aikidoist: being aware of your surroundings, trying to understand what your partner/attacker is trying to do, adjusting your moves to match his moves and lead (no clash, etc..).

The principles were translated from Japanese in the 1970s and '80s by translators with no aikido background, causing several different translations to exist. A series of YouTube podcasts made during 2019-20-2021 by the former Hawaii Ki Federation Chief instructor Christopher Curtis reviewed this.
