= Yoseikan budō =

Japanese martial art

Yoseikan Budo
- Yoseikan Budo Logo
- Country of origin: Japan
- Creator: Hiroo Mochizuki (b. 1936)
- Famous practitioners: Minoru Mochizuki, Hiroo Mochizuki
- Parenthood: karate, judo, aikido, Gyokushin-ryū, Tenshin Shōden Katori Shintō-ryū, boxing, savate
- Descendant arts: Gyokushin Ryu Aikido, Nihon Tai Jitsu

Yōseikan Budō (養正館武道) (originally Yoseikan-ryū Gyokushin Jujutsu) is a Japanese-French martial art, created by Hiroo Mochizuki, who may be classified as a sōgō budō form (総合武道, "composite" or "comprehensive" martial art), but is used here to indicate a martial art into which various martial ways have been integrated. It is probably most widely known for its descent from a pre-war style of aikido; however, it has important connections to judo, karate, boxing, savate, and a traditional forms of Japanese combat known as Gyokushin-ryū Jujutsu and Tenshin Shōden Katori Shintō-ryū. It was named after Minoru Mochizuki's dojo.

The name of the art yō-sei-kan is derived from three Japanese characters, yō meaning 'teaching', sei meaning "truth", kan meaning "place", which may be translated roughly into English as "the place where the truth is taught" or alternately "place for practising what is right"; and bu-dō. The intent of the name was not to assert an exclusive possession of the truth regarding the martial arts but rather to describe how the comprehensive nature of the Yoseikan training environment allows an individual to discover their own sense of "truth" by studying a wide range of differing martial techniques, philosophies and principles.

Yoseikan dojo originated in 1931 and was founded by Minoru Mochizuki (1907–2003), a high ranking student and assistant to Kanō Jigorō, the founder of judo, and Morihei Ueshiba, the founder of aikido, in the pre-World War II period. In addition to the very high ranks he held in these arts he was student of one of the oldest styles of traditional Japanese koryū budō, the Katori Shintō-ryō, and studied with various karate teachers including Gichin Funakoshi, the man who brought karate from the Okinawan islands to mainland Japan.

DVD Cover of Hiroo Mochizuki's "Yoseikan Budo – Traditional Style"

== Eclectic origins ==
The old Yoseikan style included mainly jujutsu, aikijujutsu, kobudo and a few karate techniques, such as: foot sweeps and trips (ashi waza), standing throws (nage waza) and groundwork (ne waza); punches, kicking and blocking techniques (kihon te waza, kihon uke waza, kihon geri waza); escapes (te hodoki), joints locks, bending or twisting (kansetsu waza), variation techniques (henka waza); sword, sticks and knife techniques; counter techniques (ura waza), chokes (shime waza) and exclusive sacrifice techniques (sutemi waza) as well as a number of solo and paired katas with and without weapons.

A curious characteristic of the old style is that it did not support much of the esoteric ways that (some contend) evolved with post-World War II traditional Aikido and some of its offshoots. At one point Kisshomaru Ueshiba, the headmaster and son of the aikido founder, reputedly asked Mochizuki to refrain from using the name aikido to refer to the aiki portion of his system. The system although still employing the term aikido is also known to use the term aiki budo to refer to this part of the art. Minoru Mochizuki's 1932 licence from Ueshiba was in Daitō-ryū Aiki-jūjutsu as Ueshiba had not yet renamed the art he was teaching (which would come to be called Aikido). Still Mochizuki continued to enjoy a warm relationship with Morihei Ueshiba even in his later years.

Although perhaps philosophically most influenced by Ueshiba (in addition to his technical studies), Mochizuki’s method of teaching and systematizing his art seems to show a larger debt to the teachings of Kanō Jigorō, perhaps due to his own roots in judo. His method of developing kata and use of a scientific approach to explain the finer parts of his art seems to show the imprint of Kano's early teaching method. Indeed, it was Kano who originally sent Mochizuki, along with other judo teachers, to study aikido with Ueshiba for the purpose of bringing back the techniques for use in the Kodokan's self-defense program. Many of these aikido inspired techniques can be seen preserved in Kodokan Goshin Jutsu kata or forms of self-defense which were most likely introduced by Kenji Tomiki, another senior judo teacher, who trained with Mochizuki at Ueshiba's dojo. In Mochizuki's case perhaps Kano's plan to have judo players learn aikido worked too well, resulting in Minoru becoming a live-in student under Ueshiba and even once being asked to inherit the leadership of the art should Kisshomaru be unable to.

Mochizuki's inclination toward eclecticism can also be seen as part of the influence imparted to him from Kano's teachings. As Kano had fused the forms of traditional jujutsu he had learned, with elements as different as ground work from the Fusen ryu and Western wrestling tactics so too did Mochizuki strive to learn many different arts in order to expand his overall understanding of fighting methods. Indeed, many of his early explorations in arts such as iaido, jodo and classical forms of jujutsu were at the suggestion of Kano during his time at the Kodokan. He expanded this to include an investigation of Western boxing, karate and classical Japanese swordsmanship. Conversely when he made the suggestion to Ueshiba that aikidoka might benefit from a knowledge of the skilled striking techniques employed by karate practitioners his suggestion met with no enthusiasm.

On a technical level the influence of judo great Kyuzo Mifune and classical jujutsu practitioner Sanjuro Oshima of the Gyokushin-ryu cannot be overstated. One of the specialties of the Yoseikan Budo system under Minoru Mochizuki came to be the use of sutemi-waza or sacrifice techniques, in which these two teachers excelled. Although the far greater influence was undoubtedly Mifune in whose lessons the youthful Mochizuki found much greater enthusiasm, the teaching of the Gyokushin theory of 'spherical spirit' stayed with Mochizuki over the years, inspiring him to invent new techniques with this art's principles in mind. Mochizuki also credited his quick mastery of aikido with having learned this style which held many techniques in common with Ueshiba's art.

In the context of contemporary aikido Minoru Mochizuki's art seems much jujutsu and judo based. Indeed, many strong judoka came to visit and train with the master throughout his life. One such person was Frenchman Patrick Auge who still maintains his own North American based organization. The type of budo practised by Auge represents very well the practises of Mochizuki Minoru from the 1970s and 1980s when Auge was a live-in student under Minoru at Yoseikan headquarters in Shizuoka. The senior teachers from the headquarters have now re-christened their school the Seifukan and seek to preserve the original style that they learned under Mochizuki-senior.

== Techniques of Minoru Mochizuki's original system ==
Yoseikan practitioners under Mochizuki Minoru were required to do a considerable amount of cross training in order to gain teaching credentials. This included gaining a minimum of a blackbelt in Judo in addition to training in Aikido, Karate and Katori Shinto Ryu and a brief six months training in Gyokushin-ryū Jujutsu under Sanjuro Oshima (he never fully learned it but decades later tried reconstruct Gyokushin-ryū techniques after witnessing wrestling suplex throws in France). Techniques found in jojutsu and iaido were also included.

The following a sampling of some the techniques practised in Mochizuki's original basic curriculum:

- Basic forms of striking (karate based)
- Footwork (taisabaki)
- Forms of joint manipulation (largely Aikijujutsu based) and throwing (largely Judo based)
- Jointlock flow and counter form
- Paired sword forms
- Sacrifice throws (Sutemiwaza) (Based on reconstructed Gyokushin-ryū techniques and Judo)
- Taking the attacker's sword (Tachitori)
- Taking the attacker's staff (Bodori)
- 2 person & 3 person grab
- Multi person attacks

Randori or 'free practice' in both single and multi-opponent situations was also a part of everyday dojo training

== Hiroo Mochizuki ==
Minoru Mochizuki's son (b. 1936), Hiroo Mochizuki, studied martial arts under his father from a very young age. He studied widely, in the eclectic system of his father, but whereas his father had perhaps a particular talent for judo, his son had a greater affinity for karate. Introducing karate in France in 1957, he returned to the country after the death of one of his father's students Jim Alcheik in 1962 and took over the large following that was growing for the art in that country. In the meantime, he graduated from Nihon Daigaku as a veterinary surgeon. He introduced new kata of his own invention, employing both Western and Eastern inspired techniques and introduced a form of point sparring for karate and kobudo tournament styles.

Hiroo must be seen as very successful both as a major innovator and a popularizer of the art, teaching it on a far larger scale than did his father, along with his connections to the quite large aikido based organizations.

Minoru died in Southern France in 2003, and before that, handed down the leadership role of the organization to Hiroo. Nowadays, few practitioners of the old style are found, as most went into the style of Yoseikan Budo created by Hiroo Mochizuki in the 1970s. The new style incorporates both traditional and modern budō, including western arts such as boxing, savate, and others. The new system also includes sporting and competition aspects, with innovative equipment allowing for safe yet powerful competition. The sporting and competition aspects are but a small part of the modern budō system and serve as devices of education and to demonstrate the art to the rest of the world.

== Essential elements of Hiroo's Yoseikan Budo ==
The Yoseikan Budo of Hiroo Mochizuki is a comprehensive Japanese martial art founded by Master Minoru Mochizuki and improved by his son’s own research into the arts. Its technique is based on shockwave movement, thus allowing more powerful hits with the energy use better spread across the body. For example, punches will always be triggered by a circular hip movement, creating a shockwave transmitted to the arm; arm muscles will only help to control the movement, most of the power is transmitted by the hips. The same applies for kicks and projections.

Some of the hallmarks of Hiroo’s Yoseikan Budo is the use of atemi (using feet, fists, elbows and knees), projections (essentially techniques from judo), sacrifice techniques (sutemi), self-defense including dangerous techniques (various joint locks, elbow hits), groundwork (ne waza) with hold-ons and joint locks, and work with weapons (bokken, wood stick, knife). Hiroo’s Yoseikan is widely practiced in Japan and Europe. One of Minoru Mochizuki's students of the older style, Patrick Auge, lives in the U.S. but his focus is on Canada where the majority of that group's practitioners reside. The United States organization continues to be affiliated with Master Hiroo Mochizuki and the World Yoseikan Federation. Master Hiroo Mochizuki of France inherited the leadership of Yoseikan Budo from his father in 1999 and now heads the Ecole Mochizuki and guides the World Yoseikan Federation as a separate entity from the groups led by Auge and other senior Mochizuki students who formed the Seifukan Dojo after death of Minoru Mochizuki in the former Yoseikan headquarters dojo in Shizuoka, Japan.

== Evolution ==
Yoseikan Budo has gone through decades of changes, modernization and improvement. Minoru Sensei never wanted to "freeze" budo in an academic form and pursued a search for constant evolution and improvement, well represented by his own words, "Never teach only what you have been taught".

Master Hiroo improved on his father's system by adding a common link to all of the martial arts Yoseikan Budo uses. This is the "vibration" or "undulation" produced by the tanden—and called qi by the Chinese—that are used in every technique (atemis, throws, locks, weapons, etc.) while allowing the user to increase his power tremendously while remaining very lithe and supple in all situations.

== Rank system ==
Yoseikan Budo used colored belts to signify progression in skill, but now all budoka wear a blue keikogi with a blue and white belt that represents the pulses a sine wave, without any distinctive rank marks. There are two major tiers of rank, the mudansha and the yudansha.

== Competition ==
The standard competition involves three kinds of sparring:

- Sude Randori (atemi/throws/osae)
- Emono Randori (with foam-padded weapons)
- Emono Sude Randori (combo, or padded tanto, against bare hands)

The rules for this form of randori include only very few prohibitions, but it is practiced with complete protective equipment to avoid injuries. Almost all techniques are used. (The forbidden techniques are basically kicks to the knees, head grab or twist, and joint locks).

Additionally, there are also some specialized competitions:

- Kata
- Aiki (with one or several opponents)
- Kyoe Randori (the supreme form of randori)
- Kenjutsu
- Bajutsu (on horse back)
- Kenpō

The Kyoe Randori involves all techniques (atemi/aiki/jujutsu) and no protective gear, but combatants must keep perfect control over all the techniques.

== Australia ==
Yoseikan Budo was introduced into Australia by Yoshiaki Unno a direct student of Minoru Mochizuki. The style was taught by Unno as separate disciplines (Karate, Aikido, Kobudo and Iaido). The Australian representative of the World Yoseikan Federation (WYF) evolved from a club founded in 1980 by Stephen Weir one of Unno's first Karate students. This club originally taught traditional Karate as its primary art. Weir handed over control of this club to Roy Hebden in 1996. Due to the retirement of Unno and a loss of contact with Yoseikan Japan around 2001 instructor Roy Hebden approached Hiroo Mochizuki to reconfirm the club's loyalty to the parent organisation. Yoseikan Budo Australia became directly affiliated to the Yoseikan World Federation, now the WYF, in 2002. Yoseikan Budo also remains affiliated to the Australian Karate Federation. Hebden was appointed the Australian WYF representative and has made many visits to France to train directly under Mochizuki and his senior instructors to learn Yoseikan Budo and ensure the club is now able to develop Yoseikan Budo using the principles developed by Hiroo Mochizuki. This club is based in Western Australia. Currently (2025)

Kobukai International Budo - Australia under Darren Edwards Shihan, a student of Unno Sensei for 16 years, teaches Yoseikan Aikijutsu and Jojutsu in Scarborough UWA Martial Arts Club under Brett Nener Sensei in Nedlands PCYC Aikido under Steven Nener Sensei in Subiaco West Coast Martial Arts Academy under Ross Taylor Shihan in Wangara Gyokushin Ryu Aikido system, under Washizu Sensei, direct student of Mochizuki who has called his Aikido system as "Gyokushin Ryu".

Yamato Aikido International under Murat Aktas Shihan in Canning Vale Gyokunenkan Aikido and Japanese Martial Arts under Colin Niland Sensei in Clarkson https://gyokunenkan.com.au/ Genesis Budo under Omid Kurdi Sensei in Balcatta Japanese Jujutsu ( Influenced by Yoseikan)

Self Defence Central Dojo under Andre Diaz Sensei in Osborne Park Hans de Jong Self Defence School under Hans de Jong Sensei in Warwick Jan de Jong Martial Arts Fitness under Paul Connolly Sensei in Claremont

== USA ==
Two veins of Mochizuki Lineage dojos are in the USA to train at:

Yoseikan Aikido:

- 24221 Hawthorne Blvd, Torrance, CA 90505
- 220 N Poston St, Shelby, NC 28150

USGRAF (United States Gyokushin Ryu Aikijujutsu) (formerly USYBA):

- Alabama:
  - Rocket City Martial Arts http://www.rocketcitymartialarts.com/
  - Location: 7560 Wall Triana Hwy, Madison, AL 35757, USA
- Florida:
  - Stetson University
  - Location: 421 N Woodland Blvd, DeLand, FL 32723
- Pennsylvania:
  - State College
- Texas:
  - Baylor University Aikijujutsu | Waco, TX
  - Aoki Dojo Aikijujutsu | Spring, TX | http://www.aokidojo.org
  - Pineywoods Aikijujutsu | Nacogdoches, TX | http://www.facebook.com/pineywoodsaikijujutsu

== See also ==
- Yoseikan
- Yoseikan Aikido
- Yoseikan Karate
