= Hirokazu Kobayashi (aikidoka) =

Japanese aikidoka (1929–1998)

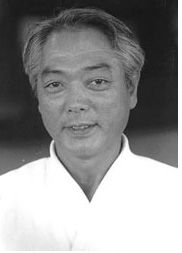
- Born: February 14, 1929
- Died: August 28, 1998 (aged 69)
- Native name: 小林 裕和 Kobayashi Hirokazu
- Nationality: (Japan) Japanese
- Style: Aikido
- Teacher: Morihei Ueshiba
- Rank: 8th dan Aikido

Hirokazu Kobayashi (小林 裕和, Kobayashi Hirokazu) (February 14, 1929 – August 28, 1998) was a Japanese aikido teacher and student of the founder of aikido Morihei Ueshiba. In 1970, at the age of 41, he was awarded 8th dan rank. He is the initiator of Kobayashi aikido (国際合気道研修会小林裕和派).

== Early life and the Pacific War ==
Already by the age of 7 years, Kobayashi was studying karate, kendo and judo. At 15, he was stationed as a kamikaze pilot on an aircraft carrier. When it came to his deployment, a technical defect prevented his airplane from joining his flight. The remaining members of his flight died. Before he could come to the next "last deployment", the aircraft carrier was torpedoed by a submarine and sank. Kobayashi was one of the few survivors. After staying in the water for as long as four days with bad injuries, he was rescued. He had held fast during the entire time to wood planks and barrels.

== Aikido ==
In 1946 his karate teacher gave him a recommendation letter for Morihei Ueshiba. With this letter he went to Tokyo, in order to learn the Japanese martial art aikido.

Kobayashi was friendly with Morihiro Saito, with whom he shared the role of uke to Ueshiba. During the aikido training if Saito was mostly requested as uke, then Kobayashi followed with the sword. For this reason Kobayashi felt always extremely connected to aikiken. Kobayashi described the long time at Ueshiba's side not only as uke, but also outside of the dojo as companion to the impulsive aikido founder, as extremely hard.

In Tokyo, Kobayashi stayed altogether for about nine years. In 1954 he moved to Osaka. Morihei Ueshiba was nearly each month in Osaka, in order to hold ten-day-long training courses. Kobayashi was the chief instructor at Kansai in 1970, and he usually acted as Ueshiba's uke whenever he visited Kansai.

In 1957, Kobayashi started training full-time in aikido. If he did not accompany Ueshiba, he taught at universities in Osaka and Kobe. In 1964 he was awarded 7th dan. In this year he was asked by Ueshiba for the first time to teach aikido in Europe. Until 1996 Kobayashi visited Europe each year for several weeks. He gave regular training courses in France, Switzerland, Belgium, Italy, Germany and in the Netherlands.

His techniques were described as very short, powerful and precise with as little movement offline as possible. His grabbing techniques consisted of "Meguri" - literally meaning flexibility and rotating of the wrist producing subtle connection points producing the maximum result with minimal levels of effort. A memorable phrase of Kobayashi's was: "Teach everything you know/have, then you feel thirsty for a higher level." Some other words people often heard him repeat while on the mat were "Itsumo manaka" (always towards the centre) and "Ima" (right now).

Kobayashi had a cordial relationship with Kenji Tomiki, founder of Shodokan Aikido. On 10 October 1969, Kobayashi invited Tomiki to Osaka, where the latter gave a short course to introduce competitive aikido to students from six local universities. In aikido circles, there was friction regarding competitive aikido because nobody knew Tomiki's theories or the essence of his aikido. Kobayashi met with Tomiki to try to understand his techniques and his intentions. He suggested that Tomiki show his aikido to the students as the best way for everyone to understand.

One of Tomiki's instructors, Tetsuro Nariyama, came to Osaka from Kokushikan University and spent six years as uchideshi with Kobayashi. Nariyama taught at the Shodokan Honbu but at the same time he was learning from Kobayashi who was teaching in the universities in that area. He accompanied Kobayashi to lessons and had the chance to introduce the students to randori.

== Legacy ==
Aikido in Kobayashi's style is still taught today in Europe, South America, India, Indonesia, New Zealand, USA, and Japan, due to Kobayashi having spent up to five months every year in traveling to teach seminars.

Kobayashi was a member of the Aikikai Foundation. He never wanted to found an organisation of his own, and asked his pupils not to do so either. His idea was to teach Aikido to everybody who wanted to learn and not to gain personal profit by doing so. A few months before he died in 1998, he gave the permission to his students to found the independent organisation, Académie autonome d'aikido, which attempted to synthesise the uniqueness of his teaching, without asserting superiority over other styles. This led to the formation of Kobayashi aikido.

Kobayashi died in August 1998 after an illness.
