= Mochizuki sensei =

Mochizuki sensei might refer to:

- Minoru Mochizuki (1907–2003), a Japanese martial artist
- Hiroo Mochizuki (born 1936), the son of Minoru Mochizuki
