= Yoseikan Aikido =

Aikido taught at the Yoseikan Dojo in Shizuoka, Japan

Yoseikan Aikidō (養正館合気道 Yoseikan Aikidō)
- Yoseikan symbol depicting Mount Fuji.
- Date founded: November, 1931
- Country of origin: Japan
- Founder: Minoru Mōchizuki (望月 稔 Mōchizuki Minoru, 1907-04-07–2003-05-30)
- Arts taught: Aikido • Judo • Karate • kobudo • kenjutsu
- Ancestor schools: Daito Ryu Aikijujutsu • Kodokan Judo • Shotokan karate • Tenshin Shōden Katori Shintō-ryū
- Descendant schools: Yoseikan Budo

Yoseikan Aikido (養正館合気道 Yoseikan Aikidō) is the aikido taught at the Yoseikan Dojo in Shizuoka, Japan, under the direction of Minoru Mochizuki (望月 稔 Mōchizuki Minoru, 1907–2003).

Mochizuki was a direct student of aikido's founder, Morihei Ueshiba. He was an uchi deshi (live-in student) from around November 1930, to around August 1931. Mochizuki maintained contact with Ueshiba until the latter's death in 1969.

In the 1970s Yoseikan Aikido was formally organised into Yoseikan Budo along with the other arts Mochizuki had studied and mastered, including judo, karate, Tenshin Shoden Katori Shinto-ryu, jujutsu, kobudo, iaido, kendo, jojutsu, and Mongolian kempo. However, some dojos still exist throughout the world that maintain their art as Aikido, and as such, still refer to it as Yoseikan Aikido, or Yoseikan Aikijujutsu/ Aikijutsu.

== Summary ==
Traditionally Yoseikan Aikido contains all the aspects present in other aikido schools, for example ai (harmony), ki (energy), kokyū (breath), seika-no-itten (one point), irimi (entering), and tenkan (turning). Other important aspects from judo are also included, including kuzushi (unbalancing), tsukuri (positioning), jita kyōei (mutual welfare and prosperity), sei ryoku zen yō (maximum efficiency).

Due to Mochizuki’s fighting experiences when introducing martial arts in France in the 1950s he felt that aikido needed a stronger technical basis to ‘meet all challengers.’ In essence all judo techniques can be thought of as Yoseikan Aikido techniques. In reality, this only adds several core judo techniques, such as hip throws, shoulder throws (which exist in other aikido schools), sacrifice throws, and foot sweeps. Many in the aikido community see the ideas of foot sweeps and sacrifice throws as contrary to the core principles of aikido, where balance and being centred are paramount. These techniques, however, do not result in a loss of centre or balance. Fundamentally, the foot sweeping techniques in Yoseikan Aikido are identical to otoshi waza (dropping techniques) in other aikido schools. The use of the foot ensures the technique is effective, even when the opponent is resisting. Less emphasis is then placed on timing, and more importantly, an overcommitted attack is not required. As for sacrifice throws, a fundamental principle used in Yoseikan Aikido is gyokushin, or the spirit of a ball. Even when a ball rolls it maintains its centre, and that is true of the Yoseikan Aikidoka when performing sacrifice throws. You do not need to be on your feet to move spherically, which is important in the application of aikido techniques.

Sincerity is another aspect which greatly influences Yoseikan Aikido. It is for this reason that Yoseikan Aikido includes basics, combinations and fundamental kata from karate Do. This makes sure that uke (the attacker) in Yoseikan is as effective and sincere in attack, as nage (the thrower) will become in defence. Before World War II, aikido students were required to have previously studied martial arts, and have a letter of reference from their instructor. This meant that all pre-war students already possessed basic skills of uke (the attacker), including falling and striking. Now, aikido may be taken as a first art. Therefore, in Yoseikan students are taught how to attack.

Put simply, the main difference between Yoseikan, and other schools is the way Mochizuki sensei structured his teachings, and hence the way aikido was taught at the Yoseikan. Yoseikan has a very logical structure, which can be seen as a fundamental influence of Jigoro Kano, who stressed the science of judo. More emphasis is placed on fundamentals, such as escaping from a grab. These techniques are typically mentioned in other aikido schools, and are the first part of a locking or throwing technique. However, in Yoseikan Aikido they are drilled and examined as basics. After its construction in 1931, Morihei Ueshiba visited, supervised, and taught at the Yoseikan, and Mochizuki was awarded his 8th Dan in the 1950s (10th Dan awarded later by the IMAF with the approval of Kisshomaru Ueshiba), as well as obtaining scrolls in Aikijujutsu from Ueshiba in the 1930s, hence, his method was approved.

== History ==
DVD Cover of Minoru Mochizuki's "Yoseikan Sogo Budo", performing Do Gaeshi

=== Japan ===
In October 1930 after witnessing a demonstration of Morihei Ueshiba, Jigoro Kano organised (in a formal letter to Ueshiba) for two students to study under him. These two men were, Jiro Takeda and Minoru Mochizuki. With his previous knowledge in judo, jujutsu, kendo and kenjutsu, Mochizuki rapidly progressed under Ueshiba. He was appointed supervisor of the uchi deshi, and also served as a teaching assistant, Ueshiba even suggested that Mochizuki marry his daughter and hence become his successor. Mochizuki was an uchi deshi under Ueshiba for several months. In mid to late 1931, Mochizuki fell ill with pleurisy and pulmonary tuberculosis. During his 3-month hospital stay the Yoseikan dojo was constructed for Mochizuki. Ueshiba, who was at the official opening of the Yoseikan in November 1931, regularly taught seminars at the dojo.

In June 1932, Ueshiba awarded Mochizuki with two Daito Ryu scrolls. The first (in Daito Ryu order) was the Hiden Ogi no Koto and the second was the Goshinyo no Te. In Daito Ryu, one learns the Hiden Mokuroku, then the Aiki no Jutsu, then the Hiden Ogi, and then the Goshinyo no Te. After attaining these four levels, the person is then qualified to teach the art. After these levels comes Kaishaku Soden and then finally Menkyo Kaiden. In terms of Daito Ryu, Mochizuki was qualified to teach all that he had learnt up the Goshinyo no Te. It is also worth noting that this is the technical level Ueshiba had achieved in Daito Ryu, although he held the official title Kyoju Dairi in Daito Ryu. This enabled Ueshiba to give instruction and travel to teach as a representative of the headmaster, Sokaku Takeda.

Aikido at the Yoseikan continued to develop until 1972, when after returning from France, Mochizuki had decided to change the name to Yoseikan Budo. This also resulted in technical restructuring and the amalgamation of the once separate arts Mochizuki taught under a single term. The characteristics of Mochizuki's Yoseikan Budo was still in essence aikido, with the addition of more Judo techniques, specifically ground work, the development of more sacrifice throws, and the inclusion Katori Shinto Ryu in higher grades.

Today the Yoseikan in Japan is home to the Seifukai, an organisation headed by Mochizuki's son Tetsuma. They maintain a strong affinity to the primarily aikido based Budo of Minoru Mochizuki.

=== France ===
In 1951, Mochizuki travelled to France mainly to teach judo, but he also found time to give instruction in aikido and is therefore credited with being the first to disseminate aikido abroad. Europe's introduction to aikido and its association with judo came about directly due to the early activities of Mochizuki. He was to set a pattern that would be repeated in most European countries where aikido would cast its roots within the existing judo community. A large number of early European practitioners were judoka who were past their competitive years and found the graceful techniques of aikido to be a perfect alternative allowing them to continue active martial arts practice. Mochizuki spent a total of two-and-one-half years in France and his efforts sowed the seeds for the development of the world's largest aikido population outside Japan. It is said that today there are more than fifty thousand active practitioners in France!

Yoseikan Aikido from Yoseikan Ryu was represented by Jim Alcheik in France in the 50'. He founded the FFATKJ, with the agreement of Minoru Mochizuki, the "Fédération française d'Aikido, de Tai-jitsu et de Kendo" (FFATK) when he came back from Japan with Hiroo Mochizuki. Jim Alcheik called this art "aikido yoseikan" or "aikido ju-jitsu" or "Tai-jitsu". Jim Alcheik died in 1962 in a bomb attack in Algeria. French and European Tai-jitsu is considered as a "cousin discipline" of martial arts taught in Yoseikan Ryu.

=== Italy ===
In the late 1950s Aikido Yoseikan was the first style of Aikido to be taught in Italy. The Italian Aikido Federation was established, chaired by the lawyer Ezio Viarana and whose technical director was the master Murakami Tetsuji (1927 - 1987), a pupil of Mochizuki Shihan. Subsequently, in the first half of the 1960s, an elderly student of Mochizuki Shihan arrived in Italy, the master Sugiyama Shoji (1933 - 2017), who settled in Turin where he opened the Dojo Sugiyama and began teaching Aikido Yoseikan. After the death of Mochizuki Shihan, the master Sugiyama, his senior pupil, developed the Yoseikan Aikijujitsu Sugiyama-ha method: this method has been recognized by the FIJLKAM (Italian Federation of Judo, Wrestling, Karate and Martial Arts) and is actually taught in Italian Dojos.

=== United States ===
The legitimate start of Yoseikan Aikido in the US was through Capt. Sadayuki Demizu of the Japanese Air Self Defense Force. As Liaison Officer for Japanese students at the missile school at Redstone Arsenal in Huntsville, Alabama, Demizu was a 4th dan in Yoseikan Aikido, mostly trained by Kyoichi Murai, but a direct student and son-in-law of Minoru Mochizuki. When Huntsville officers learned that Demizu was an aikido man, they asked him to begin teaching and he agreed. Among the first students was Thomas E. Bearden (then Captain, US Army—later retired as Lt. Col.). Glenn Pack, now the technical director of the United States Yoseikan Budo Association (USYBA) started training around this time. In February 1974, Pack began teaching Yoseikan Aikido at the University of Alabama in Tuscaloosa. Pack continued teaching at the University of Alabama until 1975, when he went to graduate work in Arkansas, leaving the Tuscaloosa class in the hands of Rick Moncrief.

In 1975, Bearden sent a letter to Mochizuki asking for a teacher to be sent to the US. In early 1976, Mochizuki sent Patrick Auge. Auge had lived in Japan for several years, with four years as an uchi deshi at the Yoseikan, and was at the time a 4th dan. Auge settled in Ottawa, Ontario in Canada. He oversaw the already established Yoseikan in the US and began teaching in Canada, with two clubs in Ottawa. Currently there are 8 schools listed under the International Yoseikan Budo Federation (IYBF) in Canada and the US, most have the word aikido in their title. The IYBF hombu is in Torrance California under the direction of Patrick Auge, with two other dojos in the US.

The USYBA, while currently affiliated with the Yoseikan World Federation under Hiroo Mochizuki, still maintains its Yoseikan Aikido like syllabus. The USYBA list seven clubs on their website through the US, some include the term aikido in their title. Another organisation in Canada is called the Canadian Association of Aikido Mochizuki. Although the term Yoseikan Aikido is not used, the origins of their aikido are with Mochizuki from the Yoseikan.

=== Australia ===
Yoseikan Aikido was the second school of aikido in Australia, and the first in the state of Western Australia. In 1968 a gentleman by the name of Phillipe Boiron began teaching Yoseikan Aikido for Jan de Jong in Perth, Western Australia. This lead Jan de Jong to travel to Japan in 1969 to train directly under Minoru Mochizuki for approximately 3 months receiving the rank of Shodan.

In 1974, on an official request from Jan de Jong, Mochizuki dispatched Yoshiaki Unno to Perth to teach Yoseikan Aikido. In 1976 Yoshiaki Unno left Jan de Jong Self Defence School and opened his own dojo teaching Iaido, Kobudo, Karate and Aikido.

A significant amount of Aikido schools in Perth had some relationship to this early introduction of Yoseikan Aikido.

Currently (2025)

- Kobukai International Budo - Australia under Darren Edwards Shihan, a student of Unno Sensei for 16 years, teaches Yoseikan Aikijutsu and Jojutsu in Scarborough
- UWA Martial Arts Club under Brett Nener Sensei in Nedlands
- PCYC Aikido under Steven Nener Sensei in Subiaco
- West Coast Martial Arts Academy under Ross Taylor Shihan in Wangara

Gyokushin Ryu Aikido system, under Washizu Sensei, direct student of Mochizuki who has called his Aikido system as "Gyokushin Ryu".

- Yamato Aikido International under Murat Aktas Shihan in Canning Vale
- Gyokunenkan Aikido and Japanese Martial Arts under Colin Niland Sensei in Clarkson https://gyokunenkan.com.au/
- Genesis Budo under Omid Kurdi Sensei in Balcatta

Japanese Jujutsu ( Influenced by Yoseikan)

- Self Defence Central Dojo under Andre Diaz Sensei in Osborne Park
- Hans de Jong Self Defence School under Hans de Jong Sensei in Warwick
- Jan de Jong Martial Arts Fitness under Paul Connolly Sensei in Claremont

=== Vietnam ===
On the 04/07/1963, at 54/14 Nguyen Binh Khiem, Saigon (The center for training martial arts), Master Wanatabe Haruye opened Yoseikan Aikido classes with the master mentor Kazuo Ischikawa (from the French Institute Yoseikan to VietNam to teach Judo). One of the most outstanding disciples of these men was Mr. Nguyen Dang Duc. And he then became the first President of Aikido Yoseikan Vietnam.

After a period of time two different schools of thought came about relating to the practice and teaching style of Vietnam Aikido Yoseikan, from that the school split into two branches.

On the 08/10/1968, Master Le Van Nhi established a dojo under the name Aikibudo at the Sports Club in Saigon (CSS), 55 Red Cross, this is The department of Culture and Labor now.

In 1970, to avoid confusion with the modern Aikido of Morihei Ueshiba O-sensei, Master Nguyen Dang Duc decided to change the name Aikido Yoseikan to Aiki Jujitsu. and this name has been used until now.

After Master Nguyen Dang Duc died, Master Bui Huu Tac became president of Aiki Jujitsu Vietnam and taught several generations of students during his career.

== Techniques ==
Technically Yoseikan Aikido is very similar to other aikido styles. The fundamental technique, Ikkyo, is referred to as Robuse, or arm rowing. The majority of other aikido techniques are included in Yoseikan Aikido, although some have different names. The fundamental attack, however, is not shomen uchi, it is an opposite posture single hand grab. Below is a list of common attacks used in Yoseikan, excluding strikes and kicks which encompass all of the basics from karate. An equivalent Aikikai attack is given in parentheses after the translation.

=== Attacks ===
Japanese: English (Aikikai equivalent):

- Jun katate dori: Normal single hand grip, axial symmetry (ai hanmi katate dori or kosa dori)
- Dosoku katate dori: Normal single hand grip, mirror symmetry (gyaku hanmi katate dori or simply katate dori)
- Gyaku katate dori: Reverse single hand grip (none)
- Ushiro kubi jime katate dori: rear neck strangle and wrist grab (same or simply ushiro kubi shime)
- Ushiro watte kumi tsuki: Rear over arm bear hug (none)
- Ushiro shitate kumi tsuki: Rear under arm bear hug (none)
- Mae ryote ippon dori: Front two hand on one grasp (morote dori)
- Mae ryote dori: Front two hand grasp (ryote dori)
- Ushiro ryote dori: Rear two hand grasp (same)
- Sode dori: Sleeve grasp (same)
- Eri dori: Lapel grasp (mune dori)
- Kata dori: Shoulder grasp (same)
- Ushiro hiji dori: Rear two on two sleeve grasp (ushiro ryo sode dori)
- Ushiro kata dori: Rear two on two shoulder (ushiro ryo kata dori)
- Ushiro eri dori: Rear collar grasp (same)
- Hadaka jime: Naked strangle (none)
- Mae kumi tsuki: Tackle (none)
- Eri dori yokomen uchi: Lapel hold side strike
- Eri dori sukiage: lapel hold upper cut
- Mae kubi tsukami shime: front neck strangle (none)
- Mae eri shimeage: Front both hand lapel grab (mune dori)
- Mae kami dori: Front hair grab (none)
- Tsukami kakari: Attempted strangle (none)

The following is a list of Locks and then throws, again with Aikikai, Yoshinkan, and Shodokan equivalents in parentheses. Please note that these techniques are used as equivalents to Yoseikan techniques for the benefit of those who study a different school of aikido, and are not meant to equate the techniques of other schools.

=== Locks ===
Yoseikan: English (Aikikai, Yoshinkan, Shodokan)

- Robuse Taoshi: Arm Rowing Takedown (Ikkyo, Ikkajo, Oshi Taoshi)
- Hiji Kudaki: Elbow Smash (Rokkyo, Hiji Shime, Waki Gatame)
- Kote Kudaki: Wrist Smash (Nikyo, Nikajo, Kote Mawashi)
- Yuki Chigai: Under Arm Twist (Sankyo, Sankajo, Kote Hineri)
- Shita Ude Garami: Lower Arm Entanglement (Kata Gatame, -, Ude Hineri)
- Kata Ha Gaeshi: Single Wing Turnover (Kata Gatame, -, Ude Hineri)
- Waki Gatame Hiki Tate: Arm Pit Control ( -, Sankajo Rengyo Ho, - )
- Kannuki Hiki Tate: Bolt Lock Control ( -, Hiki Kime, - )

=== Throws ===
Yoseikan: English (Aikikai, Yoshinkan, Shodokan)

- Kote Gaeshi: Wrist Turnover (same)
- Tenbin Nage: Yoke Throw (Ude Kime Nage, Hiji Ate Kokyu Nage, Mae Otoshi)
- Shiho Nage: Four Corner Throw (same)
- Ue Ude Garami: Upper Arm Entanglement ( -, Ude Garami, Ude Gaeshi)
- Gyaku Kote Gaeshi: Reverse Wrist Turnover (same)
- Mukae Daoshi: Meeting Takedown (Irimi Nage, Shomen Irimi Nage, - )
- Do Gaeshi: Body Overturning (Sayu Nage, Sokumen Irimi Nage, Gyaku Gamae Ate and Gedan Ate)
- Ushiro Kata otoshi: Rear Shoulder Drop (Ushiro Udoroshi, -, Ushiro Ate)
- Ushiro Sumi Otoshi: Rear Corner Drop (Sumi Otoshi, -, Sumi Otoshi)
- Kata Garuma: Shoulder Wheel (Maki Otoshi, -, - )

More techniques exist; the ones listed here have known equivalent techniques in other schools. The Aikikai and Yoshinkan refer to a lot of techniques as Kokyu Nage, a term which is not used in Yoseikan, all techniques have separate names. At higher levels the term Aiki Nage is used to describe throws utilising perfect timing, as Kokyu Nage implies, and it is also the term used in Morihei Ueshiba’s Budo Renshu.

=== Structure ===
Below is a list of the technical elements which make up Yoseikan Aikido.

- Ukemi: Falling and rolling
- Atemi: Striking methods (karate basics)
- Taisabaki: Body movements (Irimi, etc.)
- Wan Ryoku Yosei: Cultivating energy
- Tehodoki: Hand escapes
- Nigiri Gaeshi: Grip reversals
- Te Waza: Hand techniques
  - Uchi Neji Ho: Inward twisting methods (Robuse, Kote Kudaki, Yuki Chigai, etc.)
  - Soto Neji Ho: Outer twisting methods (Kote Gaeshi, Shiho Nage, etc.)
  - Chokutai Ho: Straight line body methods (Mukae Daoshi, Do Gaeshi, etc.)
  - Ude Dori Ho: Arm grabbing methods (Seoi Nage, Ushiro Sumi Otoshi, etc.)
  - Ashi Dori Ho: Leg seizing methods (using the hand to grab the leg, e.g. kicking techniques)
- Ashi Waza: Foot techniques (sweeps and reaps from Judo)
- Koshi Waza: Hip techniques (from Judo)
- Sutemi Waza: Sacrifice techniques
  - Han Sutemi Waza: Half sacrifice techniques (tori kneels)
  - Yoko Sutemi Waza: Side sacrifice techniques (tori lies on side)
  - Ma Sutemi Waza: Flat sacrifice techniques (tori lies on back)
- Kime Waza: Restraining Techniques
  - Osae Komi: Ground work (from judo)
  - Shime Waza: Choking techniques
  - Kansetsu Waza: Joint pins
- Kaeshi Waza: Counter techniques
- Renzoku Waza: Combinations and continuation Techniques
- Emono Dori: Weapon taking
  - Tanto Dori: Knife taking
  - Tachi Dori: Sword taking
  - Bo Dori: Staff taking
- Randori:
  - Shite Randori: Fixed combat (two attackers, set attack and defence)
  - Jyu Randori: Free combat (two attackers, any attack and defence)
  - Chigara Randori: Power combat (knife and stick fighting)
- Suwari Waza: Seated techniques
- Han Suwari Waza: Half seated techniques
- Ninin Dori Sanin Dori: 2 person & 3 person grab
- Kenjutsu: Sword Work
  - Suburi: Practice cuts
  - Kumitachi: Paired sword forms
  - Kenjutsu Kata: Sword forms
  - Tachi Iai: Standing sword drawing
  - Suwari Iai: Kneeling sword drawing
- Kata: Solo (striking) and paired (techniques) forms

=== Kata ===
Below is a list of Yoseikan Aikido Kata, and the techniques in them.

Solo kata;

- Happo Ken no Kata: Form of Eight Fists

The Happo Ken no Kata contains the fundamental striking and blocking techniques. Originally, the kata was made up of the following movements; 1) soto yoko uke, 2) hiji ate, 3) gedan barai, 4) gedan tsuki, 5) soto barai, 6) chudan tsuki, 7) gedan tsuki uke, 8) jodan tsuki age. The modern version of happo ken has two differences; 4) kubi uchi, 8) hiji ago tsuki age. The kata is said to have come from Shorinji Kempo, which Mochizuki studied while in Mongolia.

- Keri Yon Ho no Kata: Form of Four Kicks

The Keri Yon Ho no Kata complements the happo ken, in that it teaches the basic kicking techniques. The kata contains the following movements; 1) mae geri, 2) yoko geri, 3) ushiro geri, 4) mawashi geri. An older version of the kata, call San Bo Geri no Kata, contains only the first three kicks. Another version of the kata, Keri Go Ho no Kata. also includes; 5) ushiro mawashi geri.

Paired kata (attacker and defender);

- Ken Tai Ichi no Kata: Form of Sword and Body as One (sword attack - sword defence; sword attack - sword taking; attack - defence)
  - Tsuki - Maki Uchi Kote; Tsuki - Hiji Kudaki; Oitsuki - Hiji Kudaki
  - Kote Uchi - Hari Gaeshi Kote Uchi; Kote Giri - Kote Kudaki; Dosoku Katate Dori - Kote Kudaki
  - Tsuki - Kubi Suri Komi; Tsuki - Mukae Daoshi; Oitsuki - Mukae Daoshi
  - Kubi Giri - Kote Age Kata Uchi; Kubi Giri - Tenbin Nage; Yokomen Uchi - Tenbin Nage
  - Maki Uchi Men - Suri Age Do Uchi Ushiro Kata Uchi; Maki Uchi Men - Shiho Nage; Shomen Uchi - Shiho Nage

The Ken Tai Ichi no Kata illustrates the idea that aikido is based on Muto Ryu Kenjutsu. The first part of the five techniques, sword verses sword, demonstrates the kenjutsu form. The second part, sword taking, shows what Mochizuki refers to as the jujutsu forms. Finally, the empty hand techniques are the aikido forms.

- Jutsuri no Kata: Forms of Soft Catch (attack - defence)
  - Mae Ryote Dori - Do Gaeshi
  - Eri Dori Yokomen Uchi - Hachi Mawashi
  - Ushiro Kubi Jime Kata Te Dori - Tenbin Nage
  - Mae Kumi Tsuki - Kata Ha Otoshi
  - Tsuhari - Hazu Oshi Sutemi
- Taisabaki no Kata: Forms of Body Movement (body movement - inside or outside - technique)
  - Nagashi - Soto - Hiki Otoshi
  - Nagashi - Uchi - Kubi Otoshi
  - Hiraki - Soto - Waki Tori
  - Hiraki - Uchi - Hiza Oshi Taoshi
  - Irimi - Soto - Mukae Daoshi
  - Irimi - Uchi - Ko Uchi Gari
  - Irimi Senkai - Soto - O Soto Gari
  - Irimi Senkai - Uchi - Kata Guruma
  - O Irimi Senkai - O Irimi Senkai Ude Domoe

The Taisabaki no Kata demonstrates the use of body movement, with the judo principles of kuzushi (unbalancing), tsukuri (positioning), and gake (throwing). The kata shows how these principles relate to the aikido techniques performed.

- Hyori no Kata: Form of Escapes and Counters
  - Eri Dori Yokomen Uchi
  - Ushiro Kubi Jime Kata Te Dori
  - Yuki Chigai
  - Hiji Kudaki
  - Robuse
  - Do Gaeshi
  - Gyaku Tsuki
  - Shiho Nage
  - Tenbin Nage
  - Mukae Daoshi
  - Kata Ha Otoshi
  - Kata Guruma

The Hyori no Kata (lit. Form of Front and Back) demonstrates counter techniques, which have been removed from some aikido schools. The rolls of attacker and defender are continuously being changed. The first attacker, performing eri dori yokomen uchi, escapes the second attack, ushiro kubi jime kata te dori, with yuki chigai. The switching of rolls continues through the kata until the final technique, were the initial defender escapes kata ha otoshi to finally throw the attacker with kata garuma.

- Shime Waza Kime no Kata: Form of Chokes
- Kansetsu Waza Kime no Kata: Form of Joint Locks
- Sutemi Waza no Kata: Form of Sacrifice Throws
  - Ude Maki
  - Hiji Hari (Hiji Kake)
  - Motare Komi Sutemi
  - Kata Ha Maki
  - Gyaku Sumi Gaeshi (Oku Eri)
  - Hazu Oshi
  - Juji Jime
  - Yoko Guruma
  - Sumi Gaeshi (Kata Eri)
  - Ashi Dori (Ushiro Oku)

== See also ==
- Yoseikan
- Yoseikan Budo
- Aikido
- Yoseikan Karate
