= André Cognard =

André Cognard 8th dan, shihan, is the current head of Kobayashi aikido since the death of its founder Hirokazu Kobayashi (aikidoka). He has published several books on martial arts in French language.

== Biography ==
André Cognard started judo, karate and aikido at the age of 12. In 1975, he obtained his state diploma as a teacher of judo, aikido, karate and associated disciplines, aikido option. He also practices Kendo.

In 1982, Cognard created the Autonomous Academy of Aikido, his school in Europe.

In 1997, he created, on the proposal of Master Kobayashi, an international research group on Aikido.

In August 1998, after the death of Master Kobayashi, Cognard became a leader of the International Academy.

In 2003, he opened the Kobayashi Hirokazu Kinen Aikidojo in Bourg-Argental in the Loire region, where he lives.

In 2016, he received the award from the Japanese Ministry of Foreign Affairs, and 3AKH was recognized as a "Franco-Japanese friendship association "

In 2022, according to the official decision of the Emperor of Japan, he was awarded the medal of the Order of the Rising Sun, Silver Ray, by the head of the consular office of Japan in Lyon.

== Published works ==
- Andre Cognard: Le corps conscient Dervy, 1999, ISBN 2-84454-016-3
- Andre Cognard: Civilisation et arts martiaux, ou, Le noeud de la ceinture Albin Michel Publications, France, 2000, ISBN 2-226-07993-9
- Andre Cognard: Le disciple, Dervy, 2002 ISBN 2-84454-150-X
- Andre Cognard: Le corps philosophe, Centon, 2003 ISBN 2-915384-00-2
- Andre Cognard: L'esprit des arts martiaux Albin Michel Publications, France, 2003, ISBN 2-226-13684-3
- Andre Cognard: Le maître, Dervy, 2004 ISBN 2-84454-283-2
- Andre Cognard: Vivre sans ennemi, Le Relié, 2004 ISBN 2-914916-44-2
- Andre Cognard: Petit manuel d'aikido, Centon, 2005 ISBN 2-915384-01-0
- Andre Cognard: Mémoires d'outre-moi, Centon, 2006 ISBN 2-915384-04-5
- Nadja Maria Acioly-Régnier, Clémentine Amouroux, Jean Jacques Boutaud, Paul Castella, Patrick Chignol, André Cognard, Andrea Debiasi, Marco Favretti, Victor Gouttebroze, Sergio Morra, Giangiorgio Pasqualotto, Jean Claude Régnier, Shingai Tanaka: Pour qu'éduquer ne soit pas un monologue, 2008 ISBN 978-2-915384-07-9
- Andre Cognard: Lhassa, Osaka, Essendilène, Centon, 2010 ISBN 978-2-915384-08-6
- Andre Cognard: La disciple et les sabres invincibles, Centon, 2012 ISBN 978-2-915384-17-8
- Andre Cognard: Père, Fils, Centon, 2012 ISBN 978-2-915384-10-9
