= Tetsuro Nariyama =

Japanese aikido teacher (born 1947)

- Born: November 21, 1947 (age 78); Yamadera, Yamagata Prefecture, Japan
- Native name: 成山 哲郎 Nariyama Tetsuro
- Nationality: Japanese
- Style: Aikido
- Teachers: Kenji Tomiki, Hideo Ohba, and Hirokazu Kobayashi
- Rank: 9th dan Aikido

Tetsuro Nariyama (成山 哲郎 born November 21, 1947) was born in Yamadera, Yamagata Prefecture and is a Japanese aikido teacher, the technical director of the Shodokan Aikido Federation and chief instructor (Shihan) of the Shodokan Hombu Dojo in Osaka, Japan.

He was appointed to the latter position by the creator of this style Kenji Tomiki, one of Morihei Ueshiba's early students. At 9th Dan he is the highest-ranking Shodokan instructor in the world and travels internationally to teach aikido.

In addition to his studies with Kenji Tomiki he lived as uchideshi to Hirokazu Kobayashi for six years effectively learning aikido from the founder of aikido Morihei Ueshiba's first and last generation deshi. During that time he introduced Tomiki's randori method to university aikido clubs under Kobayashi's control.

He has co-authored the book Aikido Tradition and the Competitive Edge with Fumiaki Shishida.
