= Yoseikan Karate =

Karate style

- Also known as: Yoseikan-ryu
- Focus: Striking
- Hardness: Full contact
- Country of origin: Japan
- Creator: Minoru Mochizuki
- Parenthood: Shotokan
- Olympic sport: no

Yoseikan Karate (養正館空手) or Yoseikan Ryu Karate (養正館流空手) is the name given to the variant of Shotokan Karate taught at the Yoseikan Dojo in Shizuoka, Japan, under the direction of Minoru Mochizuki (望月 稔 Mōchizuki Minoru, 1907–2003).

Minoru Mochizuki trained directly under Gichin Funakoshi, the man who formally introduced Karate to the Japanese mainland in 1921. In the 1970s, Minoru Mochizuki formally organised his arts into Yoseikan Budo, including Karate, aikido, judo, Tenshin Shoden Katori Shinto-ryu, jujutsu, kobudo, iaido, kendo, jojutsu, and kempo. A small number of schools through the world still focus on the traditional Karate aspect of Yoseikan, and as such refer to it as Yoseikan Karate, or Yoseikan Ryu Karate.

== Yoseikan Karate in Europe ==
In 1954, Minoru Mochizuki taught the first European students Yoseikan Karate, first in Switzerland and then in France, where he was invited to teach for the founder of the French Karate Federation, Henri Plee. From there Yoseikan Karate, as it became known, crept across Europe.

=== France ===
In 1957, Minoru Mochizuki sent his eldest son, Hiroo Mochizuki, to France to teach Karate in Europe. Hiroo Mochizuki returned to Japan in 1959 to finish his studies. In 1963, he returned to France in order to replace Jim Alcheik, the senior Yoseikan student in France, who had died in 1961. Hiroo Mochizuki participated in the creation of the French Karate Federation, and in 1964 he became the first technical advisor to the French Karate Federation and European Karate Union. In the 1970s, under the supervision of Hiroo Mochizuki, the French Karate team became the first foreign team to defeat the Japanese team in the Karate world championships. After some time, Hiroo Mochizuki developed his own style; he initially called it Yoken, but later he changed the name to Yoseikan Budo to honour his father.

=== England ===
In 1955, Henri Plee, the founder of the French Karate Federation, invited Vernon Bell to study Yoseikan Karate along with other representatives from Germany (Mr Seydel) and Italy (Mr Malatesti). All eventually received their Shodan (1st Dan) diplomas from Minoru Mochizuki and were all asked to consider setting up national federations for the development of Yoseikan in each of their own countries. In 1956 Vernon Bell founded the British Karate Federation (B.K.F.) with the intention of forming a governing body for all Karate styles in the UK.

Some of the first pupils trained at the Royal British Legion hall in Upminster, Essex. Between 1958 and 1965, Vernon Bell helped established branches throughout England; as the B.K.F continued to grow, he also continued to encourage Japanese sensei teachers to visit British dojos. In 1965, following correspondence with the Japan Karate Association (JKA), which was at that time under the supervision of Chief Instructor Masatoshi Nakayama, Vernon bell agreed to personally sponsor a visit by a group of JKA instructors to help the future development of (Shotokan) Karate in the U.K. These included Taiji Kase, Hirokazu Kanazawa, Keinosuke Enoeda, and Hiroshi Shirai. Although ultimately successful for the British Karate Movement and in particular Shotokan Karate, this eventually marked the downfall of the B.K.F due to disagreements between Mr. Bell and the B.K.F committee. The B.K.F eventually disbanded in 1966, with most of the members opting to join the newly formed Shotokan organisations.

As a result, Vernon Bell redirected his efforts back towards the original Yoseikan Karate system he had learnt years earlier. He also promoted the arts of Jujutsu, Judo, Aikido to the few members he had left. Most of which eventually left Vernon bell to form independent groups of their own. ( For details of instructors affiliated & currently teaching for the Yoseikan Karate Association U.K, reference may be taken from the Dan grade teachers page of the official YKA web site ).

Many years later in 2001 Vernon Bell presented Chris Clarry with official documentation entrusting him with the duty of continuing the original Yoseikan Karate lineage, originally bestowed to Vernon Bell by the Minoru Mochizuki, via Henri Plee. Chris Clarry (8th Dan) continues to promote the name of Yoseikan Karate, actively teaching the many students & Black belt members of the Yoseikan Karate Association U.K.

== Yoseikan Ryu Karate in Japan ==
Yoseikan Ryu Karate in Japan, as with other counties, traces its origins back to Minoru Mochizuki and the Yoseikan. Today Teruo Sano, a student of Minoru Mochizuki, oversees Yoseikan Ryu Karate in Japan, and around the world under his organisation, Yoseikan Ryu Karate International. Affiliated groups exist in Australia, as well as Canada and Europe.

== Yoseikan Ryu Karate in Australia ==
The origins of Yoseikan Karate in Australia began in aikido in 1968. In that year, Phillipe Boiron began teaching Yoseikan Aikido for Jan de Jong in Perth, Western Australia. This led de Jong to travel to Japan in 1969 to train directly under Minoru Mochizuki. In 1974, on an official request from de Jong, Mochizuki sent Yoshiaki Unno to Perth to teach Yoseikan Aikido. He also taught iaido, kobudo, and karate. One of Unno's early students was Branco Bratich OAM, currently ranked 9th dan. Bratich, now under Teruo Sano's Yoseikan Ryu Karate International, became responsible for the spread of Yoseikan Karate across Australia, starting with his first club in 1978.

== Yoseikan Ryu Karate in Canada ==
In Québec, contrary to the Shotokan, which is more widespread, more competitive and which is practised with more force, Yoseikan-Ryu puts the emphasis on the speed of the movement and the use of force only at the last moment of the movement.

In Canada, Master Aymé Favre imported the Yoseikan style. Master Favre taught his techniques with Jacques Marleau and Jim Hartnell. The first dojo Yoseikan-Ryu in Canada was opened in Montreal, at the House of Radio-Canada, in 1973.

On January 21, 1999, Masters Andre Bertrand, Jim Hartnell, Jacques A. Marleau and Michel Shaheen registered the name "Association Yoseikan-Ryu." It acts as an association of Karate operating mainly in the area of Longueuil, Pointe-aux-Trembles and La Prairie.

In Québec city, a branch of Yoseikan Karate called "Yoseikan Karaté-Do" was founded by Giancarlo Borelli-Lucchesi. The present master is Louise Chevalier, Kyoshi, 8th dan Yoseikan Karaté-do.

== See also ==
- Yoseikan
- Yoseikan Budo
- Yoseikan Aikido
