= Nippon Kempo =

Japanese martial art

- Also known as: Nipponkempo, Nihon Kempo, Nikken, Nichiken
- Focus: Striking, Throwing, Ground Fighting
- Country of origin: Japan
- Date of formation: 1932
- Creator: Muneomi Sawayama
- Famous practitioners: Yuichiro Nagashima, Jiro Watanabe, Michele Cianciulli, Kenichi Ogawa, Kenoh, Hiromi Wajima
- Parenthood: Judo, Pre-Kodokan Jujutsu, Okinawan martial arts, Shitō-Ryu Karate, Goju-Ryu Karate
- Descendant arts: Modern Taiho-jutsu, Jieitaikakutōjutsu (Self-Defense Forces Fighting)

Nippon Kempo (日本拳法, Nippon Kenpō) is a Japanese martial art created by Muneomi Sawayama in 1932. Sawayama was a judoka who had studied under Kenwa Mabuni, a karate practictioner who would establish the Shitō school of Karate. There are multiple schools and groups based on the Nippon Kempo Association launched by Sawayama, and each has its own rules. It is typically practised wearing protective gear (face, body, crotch, etc.) and gloves and allows full use of stand-up striking, throwing, and ground fighting.

== History ==
=== Foundation ===
Origins of Nippon Kempo and its conception by Muneomi Sawayama (real name Katsu Sawayama) were not thoroughly specified in Sawayama's research and/or writings. However, various external sources exist that specify Sawayama's development of Nippon Kempo.

Sawayama was originally interested in "atemi" techniques, and when he was a student at Kansai University in the early Showa period, he researched old-style jujutsu (before Kanō Jigorō's founding of Kodokan Judo), but was not impressed by the results.

Therefore, Sawayama invited Kenwa Mabuni (founder of Shito-ryu) and his friend Chojun Miyagi (founder of Goju-ryu), who had moved from Okinawa to Osaka and started teaching karate (currently karate), to Kansai University at Karate Study Group established on June 15, 1930.

Later, when Sawayama's apprentice Ryonosuke Mori asked Yasuhiro Konishi, who had a close relationship with both Mabuni and Miyagi, about various martial arts masters, Konishi had replied that Sawayama had studied under Mabuni but had nothing to do with Miyagi.

Unlike with Mabuni, who had moved to Osaka, Sawayama did not have much time to study under Cho Miyagi, who still lived in Okinawa and only visited Kansai temporarily. However, in "Overview of Karate Do" written by Chojun Miyagi in 1934, the name "Katsu Sawayama" is specified as a "person involved in karate instruction" who is active outside Okinawa Prefecture.

Although he began to learn karate, most of the lessons were Kata, and Sawayama, who was interested in free discussions, gradually lost interest in karate. Therefore, Sawayama began kumite lessons in the precincts of Tarumi Shrine in Suita, Osaka Prefecture, where he could freely meet with his fellow students. The Tarumi Shrine would serve as birthplace of Nippon Kempo.

Then, in 1932, after graduating from the Faculty of Law at Kansai University, in the fall of the same year, he officially launched a martial art that was different from Karate, which he called "Dainippon Kempo."

However, at that time, Mabuni also called himself an organization with a similar name, "dai nipponkenpō Kansai sora shujutsu kenkyūkai," before renaming it to Shito-ryu. How much this is a coincidence or intentional is unclear. In Chojun Miyagi's "Overview of Karate-do", Sawayama is still described as teacher of Karate leader and practising with Karate Gi. Then, in 1934, Sawayama began practising with armour/protective gear currently associated with Nippon Kempo.

Sawayama held the Nippon Kempo Association based in his alma mater, the Kansai University in Suita City, and from the beginning the art started to spread among university athletic associations. Ryonosuke Mori, a disciple who was entrusted with advancing the art to the Kanto region, was temporarily expelled immediately after moving to Tokyo around 1958.

After being established, Mori's Nippon Kempo Association started dissemination activities in the Kanto area. After that, the association was split and a federation was born. In the Kanto area, the first Nippon Kempo club at a university in eastern Japan was founded in the Rissho University and has gradually expanded since then.

=== Spread and influence in Japan ===
Since Sawayama studied with students of Kansai University when Nippon Kempo was founded, he was considered a "strong man with academic skill to match". After that, Kokushikan University and Meiji University began to push out practitioners towards the Kansai region, and practitioners who left a significant track record in high schools were often pushed towards universities in the Kanto region. Other powerful entities include Chuo University, Ryukoku University, Osaka University of Commerce, Waseda University, Kwansei Gakuin University, and Ritsumeikan University. In addition, the Doshisha University, which does not accept male practitioners, is also doing well at the aforementioned universities.

Per Chris Crudelli, various Japanese Police Departments utilize Nippon Kempo as part of their training, to improve the officers' unarmed fighting skills and self-confidence.

Due to its high availability, the association's Kempo was incorporated into the training of the Self-Defense Forces, with Ryonosuke Mori participated in the crafting of the Self-Defense Forces' fighting manual, alongside masters of Kempo, Judo, and Tomiki-ryu Aikido. In addition, Mori is also a lecturer at the Japanese National Police Academy and has had a great influence on development of police arrest techniques. There are Nippon Kempo clubs at universities all over the Japan, and is one activities of that can serve as basis for graduation.

Shunji Matsunaga won the All Japan Kenpo Individual Championship nine times in a row from 1962 to 1970, and then won in 1975, holding the record for consecutive wins and the highest number of wins in history. In addition, Tetsuo Zako has won a total of 49 times and has also provided guidance overseas, helping to spread Nippon Kempo overseas.

== Overseas ==
In 1960 Nippon Kempo was introduced to the United States by one of Sawayama's students, Goki Kinuya when the latter came to California to study. He started the American Nippon Kempo Federation.

The style was brought to Mexico in 1971 by the Shihan Tsunanori Sakakura Koike and the Shihan Toshinori Saito.

In 1977 Nippon Kempo was introduced to England by Luther De Gale after he spent a year in Japan. Nippon Kempo was also introduced to Ukraine, and many many other European countries.

=== Italy ===
It all began in 1969 when two Judo Masters met, Master Armando Santambrogio and the Japanese Master Hota. In addition to Judo they had practiced Ju-jitsu and Nippon Kempo respectively. The fighting style taught by the two masters was improperly called Nippon Kempo and it was a good fighting method, but it was totally lacking kata and use of armor, which are essential in the original Nippon Kempo. Despite this was a hybrid version of it, we can say this was the beginning of Nippon Kempo in Italy. In 1978 Master Santambrogio went to Japan to get in contact with the Nippon Kempo Kyokai federation directed by its founder Grand Master Ryonosuke Mori, who was also a student of the founder of Nippon Kempo, Grand Master Sawayama Masuro Muneomi. After making contacts, in October of the same year the Japanese federation officially sent the young Master Toshio Koike to Italy. He was an excellent fighter with an elegant style. The practice of Nippon Kempo in Italy began in its original version with Master Koike. We can state Master Santambrogio was the undisputed promoter of Nippon Kempo in Italy and France, while, after the return of Master Koike to Japan, technical teaching continued with Master Giovanni Guccione and Master Daniele Sinigaglia, former instructors of Nippon Kempo before the original style was introduced. The two masters devoted themselves to training coaches, instructors, and masters for many years. In 1980 Master Giovanni Guccione went to Japan to be examined by the Grand Master Ryonosuke Mori, while Master Daniele Sinigallia went there the following year. In 1981 Master Giovanni Guccione founded the first Nippon Kempo association in Italy called: A.N.K.I. (Nippon Kempo Italy Association) "Sei Shin Kan". In 1986 Master Armando Santambrogio founded A.I.N.K. (Italian Nippon Kempo Association).

=== France ===
It was during a demonstration organized on May 20, 1984 by the Judo Club of Saint-Dié that Armand Santambrogio introduced the Nippon Kempō in France. Ali Zoubiri (A judo coach) became interested in this martial art and opened a Nippon Kempō school within the Saint-Dié Judo club. For several years, he practiced Japanese kempō with his students, in France and abroad, in various competitions and courses. Currently, the most experienced French kempōka have now opened their own Nippon kempō in clubs.

New teachers became interested in this discipline and created other sections in the Vosges, and this is how Nippon Kempō continued to develop in the great East of France and then in other regions of the territory.

On March 26, 2016, the Nippon Kempo Club of Nancy presented the very first French demonstration of Nippon Kempo at the Festival des Arts Martiaux de Karate-Bushido (Karate-Bushido Martial Arts festival) in the arenas of Bercy, Paris.

In September 2018 Ali Zoubiri was awarded 7th Dan in Nippon Kempo by the All Japan Federation of Nippon Kempo, which makes Ali Zoubiri the highest ranking Nippon Kempo practitioner outside Japan.

== Style Overview ==
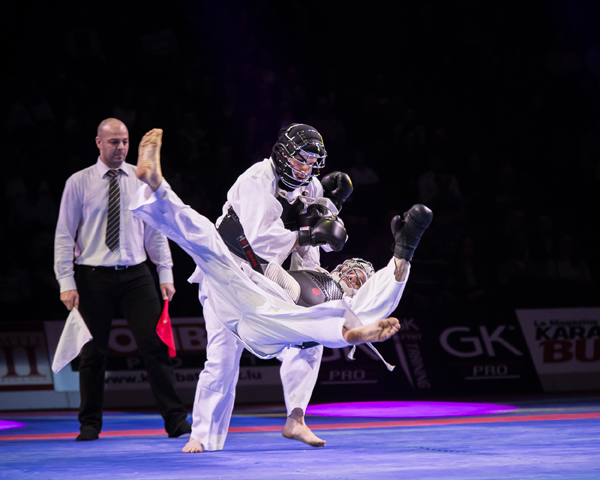
Demonstration of Nippon Kempo in France.

Nippon Kempo was one of the first modern martial arts to establish the form of free fighting and being practised in protective gear. A Nippon Kempo match is not referred to as Kumite, but "bōgu renshū" (防具練習, eng. Armor Practice, used by Kenpo-kai.) Sora ran is used for semi-contact bouts and sō ran is used for shadowboxing type of practice.

As for the decision of victory or defeat in the game, the Kenpokai adopts a three-game match like Kendo. Kempo association adopts a point system.

Nippon Kempo places an equal emphasis on striking techniques using hands and feet, immobilization and controls, projections and take-downs. Nippon Kempo is a defensive art that does not restrict students in methodology.

From a technical point of view, Nippon Kempo is a martial art system based on techniques of striking and kicking, (atemi-waza), blocking (uke-waza), throwing (nage-waza), reverse joint locks (kansetsu-gyakutori-waza) and ground combat (ne-waza). It uses techniques derived from other arts including judo, jujutsu and karate.

Practitioners fight and practice these techniques with protective gear, as the art is full-contact and therefore men (helmet), do (breastplate), kurobu (gloves), and a mata ate (groin protector) are used. Grabbing a strike or locking a joint is allowed, as are knees and elbows to the body or to the face score points. As "headhunting", the practice of trying to score quickly with a punch to the head is common, practitioners aim to learn and develop head and body movements to avoid, deflect or counter many punching and kicking combinations.

== Martial arts legacy ==
Since its inception, Nippon Kempo has a long history of direct striking and making full use of various other techniques, long before the mixed martial arts movement.

Style founder Sawayama regarded Nippon Kempo as an "zen hōi-tekina budō" (全方位的な武道, eng. omnidirectional martial art). It was one of the first Japanese martial arts to allow punches to the head.

Sawayama describes Nippon Kempo as "ancient Pankration" but "safer with [protective gear] and supplementary rules." Since the first UFC event in 1993, ground fighting and positioning have become important elements in modern combat sports. One of the reasons for Sayama to found Nippon Kempo was the lack of ground fighting and positioning in Judo. In Japan, Nippon Kempo is credited in helping dispel notions that Judo would be enough to repel submission grappling styles in vein of Pankration. It was also unique to other martial arts that it allowed striking techniques in ground fighting such as stepping kicks and knee kicks to the head from the 4-point position, allowing these sorts of techniques be incorporated to competitions and to be systematized further.

Exchanges with other schools is also active. Since 2005, the professional mixed martial arts show "HEAT" has been held regularly at Nippon Kempo Dojo at Concentric Hall in Nagoya (Nippon Kempo All-Union Central Japan Branch).

Practitioners of Nippon Kempo have fought in the Hokutoki Tournaments hosted by Daido juku, which features a martial art similar to Nippon Kempo known today as Kudo (formerly Kakuto Karate). Yasushi Tsujii (Kenpokai), Takayuki Sato (Kenpokai), Katsushi Okazaki (Aoba Kenpokai), Toru Saito (Nippon Kempo Azusakai), Shinya Yamauchi (Aoba Kenyukai) and other Nippon Kempo players have participated, and have won top prizes and awards.

== See also ==
- Kūdō - similar Japanese martial art
- Sport Jujutsu
- Shooto
- Shorinji Kempo
- Hapkido
- Shidokan Karate
- Bōgutsuki Karate
