= Jieitaikakutōjutsu =

Japanese martial art

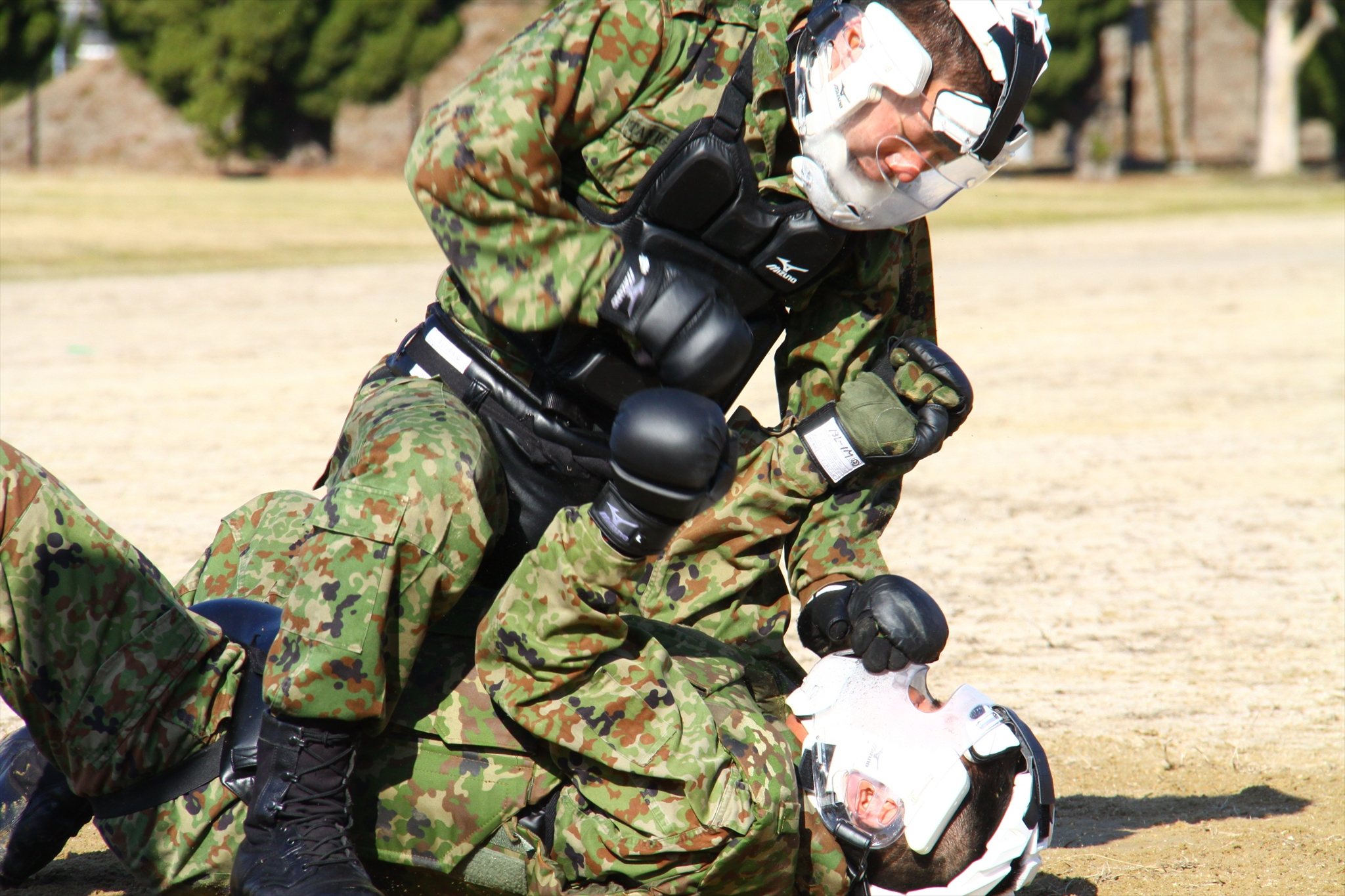
- Ground Self-Defense Force fighting instructor group training (January 2011)
- Also known as: Japan Ground Self-Defense Force Combatives; Self-Defense Forces (SDF) Martial Arts
- Focus: Striking, reversals throwing technique, choke-holds, grappling holds
- Country of origin: Japan
- Creator: No single creator: 1959 curriculum developed by various people, including Ryonosuke Mori and Kenji Tomiki.; Persons responsible for 2008 curriculum are not named.
- Parenthood: Nippon Kempo; Aikido (Note: Despite Kenji Tomiki - the founder of Shodokan Aikido - being one of people helping to form the earlier version of the system, Tomiki woulun't found Shodokan Aikido proper until 1967. Earlier Jieitaikakutojutsu hand-to-hand combat system was developed from 1955 and finalized in 1959.); Judo; Sumo Wrestling (Note: This style contains techniques like Kubihineri from Sumo.); US Military Combatives

Jieitaikakutōjutsu (Japanese: 自衛隊格闘術, lit. 'Self-Defense Forces Martial Arts') is a military self-defence and fighting system developed for JSDF personnel. The system primarily consists of hand-to-hand combat, bayonet and knife fighting principles.

Jieitaikakutōjutsu is primarily used by the Ground Self-Defense Force, although the Maritime Self-Defense Forces and the Air Self-Defense Forces have units that incorporate it within their combat training. The JSDF holds inter-branch fighting competition named Kai tōkai, to test Ground and Maritime Forces' fighting skills. The JSDF occasionally holds Jieitaikakutōjutsu exhibitions referred to as "tenji" (展示).

Since 2008, the Ground Self-Defense Force has been introduced to a new/revised form of Jieitaikakutōjutsu to its combat units.

== History ==
=== Military martial arts during Imperial Japan era ===
In the Imperial Japanese Army, melee combat training mainly consisted in use of bayonets, knives (or daggers), and swords. Hand-to-hand combat without weapons was mandatory only for Military Police Corps, and voluntary training for regular troops. The personnel of Imperial Japanese Navy were encouraged to practice judo, kendo, sumo, and jukendo.

=== Inception of the Self-Defense force martial arts ===
After the war, a JGSDF officer who studied at the US Military Academy advised the Ground Staff Office on the need for hand-to-hand combat that could be linked to bayonet fighting, based on his experience of observing US Army military training. In response to this, research began in 1955, and with the cooperation of Ryonosuke Mori (the highest ranked instructor of the Nippon Kempo Association at the time) and Kenji Tomiki, a hand-to-hand fighting curriculum was established in 1959.

The fighting manual established in 1959 consisted of hand-to-hand combat fighting, bayonet fighting and knife fighting. In place of bayonets, Jūkendō was also occasionally used. However, these arts are no longer practiced in JSDF after the adoption of the 2008 Jieitaikakutōjutsu curriculum.

==== Hand-to-hand combat (Toshu kakutō) ====
The early Self-Defense Forces martial arts was chiefly based on Nippon Kempo, but also composed of techniques from judo, sumo wrestling and aikido.

In 1984, the All Self-Defense Forces Hand Fighting Federation (Jieitai toshu kakutō renmei ) was organized to unify the know-how and improve the skill level, and the 1st All Self-Defense Forces Hand Fighting Tournament was held.

==== Bayonet fighting (Jūken kakutō) ====
In the current Self-Defense Forces, the bayonet drills are based on the ones used by the former Japanese Army. Both the war-time martial arts and the self-defense force bayonet fighting established after the war are still carried out. In particular, the training of Jukendo is actively carried out mainly by the Infantry Company, which helps to improve the unity of the company.

Whereas the only technique in Jukendo is piercing with the tip (tampo) that corresponds to the blade of the bayonet, in the modern bayonet curriculum, in addition to piercing, slashing, or defending with the bayonet and hitting with the stock, it also includes hitting with the entire gun and piercing and shooting the gun.

==== Knife fighting (tanken kakutō) ====
In the former Japanese army, knife fighting (tankendo, which is also included in the current Jukendo) was trained based on the small swordsmanship of ancient Japanese martial arts. On the other hand, the modern Self-Defense Forces knife fighting is said to be based on the knife fighting technique utilized by the US Army.

=== Current Self-Defense Forces martial arts (the new / modern combatives) ===
The contents of the Jieitaikakutōjutsu martial arts curriculum was changed in 2008 and adopted that year onwards. This new martial art is called "shinkakutō" (the new martial art) within the Japan Self-Defense Forces.

At the turn of the millennium, military and security agencies in each country have revised hand-to-hand combat systems on the assumption that firearms cannot always be used effectively in response to modern threats, such as terrorism and guerrilla warfare. Japan has not been an exemption for this, as in late 1990s and early 2000s, numerous "suspicious ship incidents" involving North Korea have occurred and posed an increasing danger to Japan and its citizens. There was also the growing possibility of JSDF personnel getting into close-quarters combat situations against terrorists or guerrilla fighters in the 2000s, following the escalation of the global war on terrorism. This also concerns those who participate in peacekeeping operations where there's a chance that they can get caught in fighting.

Around 2000, the Ground Self-Defense Forces considered reviewing the entire martial arts curriculum, so that JSDF personnel can rely on its self-defence system to accomplish their mission and to defending themselves in a critical moment.

The study began in earnest when Tsutomu Mori, Ground Self-Defense Force's Chief of Staff of the time, instructed in the early establishment of a practical hand-to-hand fighting system. As a result, a martial arts research project team was established in the First Education Division of the Self-Defense Forces Physical Education School, and drastically reviewed martial arts.

The technical system has also been significantly revised, and the classification of hand-to-hand fighting, bayonet fighting, and knife fighting are now referred to as "weapon technology".

At the same time, the protective gear used in the training was changed to Mizuno's lightweight and easy-to-wear gear in order to train the skills and mental strength of the SDF personnel for the actual mission. It is innovative protective gear that is safer than older kinds of protective gear, preventing physical damage, however may not necessarily prevent all pain and injury.

In 2006, the new, refined version of Jieitaikakutōjutsu was fielded by 10th Division, based on the research results of the martial arts research project team. Education and training methods were examined during 2007 and all were introduced in 2008. The subjects of the new fighting training are all SDF personnel of two or fewer, and they have been introduced into the work assessment as skills suitable for their actual duties.

In the Maritime and the Air Self-Defense Force, only SDF personnel who have security officer and base guard duties will learn Jieitaikakutōjutsu for their duties.

=== Techniques of modern Jieitaikakutōjutsu ===
At present, the specific content of Jieitaikakutōjutsu fighting manual has not yet been clarified. What is known is that essentially, it is similar to the pre-2008 style that is based on Nippon Kempo, but now has a new emphasis on added throws and choke-hold techniques. Techniques that have been previously mentioned in the army manuals, but have not been trained in the older style (age-uchi, ashikubigatame, sankakujime nado, etc.) have been made system's curriculum.

== Basics ==
Striking techniques (atemi):

- Tsuki
- Mawashi-uchi - Turn and hit the hook
- Age-da - Lifting uppercut
- Hiji-uchi - Elbow strike
- Maegeri - front kick
- Yokogeri - Horizontal kick
- Hizageri / Knee kick
- Mawashi geri / Roundhouse kick
- Ushiro-Geri / Back kick

Throwing techniques (nagewaza):

- Kubi-gaeshi
- Kubihineri
- O goshi
- Seoi nage
- Ōsoto gari
- Deashi barai
- Kosoto gake
- uchi gake

Joint-locks (Kansetsu-waza):

- Tekubi-gaeshi
- tekubi hineri
- udegatame
- kainahineri
- udegarami
- Ude hishigi juji gatame

Chokeholds (Shimewaza):

- Hadakajime / rear naked choke
- Okuri eri jime
- Jūji jime

Knife Defense (Tanken)

Rifle Defense (Shōjū)

These are just a few of the SDF unarmed fighting techniques. However, JSDF personnel are pitted in various possible fighting scenarios.

- Unarmed vs. unarmed
- Knife vs. knife
- knife vs. club (kanbo)
- Knife vs. rifle
- Knife vs. knife
- Unarmed vs. rifle
- Unarmed vs. pistol
- Rifle vs. rifle
- One vs. multiple
- other scenarios

=== Self-Defense Forces Fighting Weapon Methods ===
Equivalent to the bayonet and knife fighting techniques of pre-2008 style. A significant change is in the attitude and intensity of knife fighting.

== See also ==
- Combatives
- Marine Corps Martial Arts Program
- Sambo (martial art)
  - ARB (martial art)
- Krav Maga
- Zero Range Combat
