= Fumiaki Shishida =

Japanese aikidoka

- Born: 1949 (age 76–77)
- Native name: Shishida Fumiaki
- Nationality: (Japan) Japanese
- Style: Aikido
- Teachers: Kenji Tomiki and Hideo Ohba
- Rank: 8th dan Aikido

Other information
- Website: www.f.waseda.jp/fuzanaoi/

Fumiaki Shishida (born 1949) is a Japanese aikido teacher, and one of traditionally two Shihan of the Japan Aikido Association, where he holds the rank of 8th dan.

He is a Professor of Intellectual History of the Japanese Martial Arts at Waseda University and author of several works on the subject. He obtained his doctoral degree from Waseda University in 2003. He won the Japan Society of Sport History prize in 2006 for his book The Educational Strength of Japanese Budo: The Budo Training at Kenkoku University in Manchukuo (in Japanese). He is also the primary author of Aikido Kyougi (second author Tetsuro Nariyama); the English translation is titled Aikido Tradition and the Competitive Edge. He has also compiled and edited a series of essays by Kenji Tomiki under the title "Budo Ron".

== Sources ==
- Aikido Journal Encyclopedia entry for Fumiaki Shishida
- European Tomiki Aikido Federation (ETAF)
