= Kobayashi aikido =

School of aikido

Kokusai Aikidō Kenshūkai Kobayashi Hirokazu Ha (国際合気道研修会小林裕和派) is the school of aikido propagated by Hirokazu Kobayashi (1929–1998) (not Yasuo Kobayashi) disciple of the founder of aikido Morihei Ueshiba (1883–1969). Hirokazu Kobayashi's teaching abroad focused on several European nations including France, Germany, Italy, Portugal and Poland, and these countries formed the core of his independent style.

After the death of Kobayashi in 1998, this school is led by Andre Cognard (self-proclaimed). In addition to Europe, Kobayashi Aikido is practiced in South Africa, Indonesia, India, Belarus, Russia, Ukraine, Mexico and Colombia.

There are several differences between the Kobayashi style and the other Aikido styles such as Aikikai. The most striking of these are the suwariwaza (seated techniques) and the meguri principle. There are also subtle and significant differences in the different tachiwaza (standing) techniques as well as jō and bokken sequences.
