= Hideo Ohba =

Japanese martial artist

- Born: April 27, 1910
- Died: February 2, 1986 (aged 75)
- Native name: 大庭 英雄 Ōba Hideo
- Nationality: (Japan) Japanese
- Style: Judo, Aikido, Kendo, Naginata and Iai
- Teachers: Kenji Tomiki and Morihei Ueshiba
- Rank: 9th dan Aikido; 6th dan Judo; 4th dan Kendo

Hideo Ohba (大庭 英雄, Ōba Hideo; April 27, 1910 – February 2, 1986) was a Japanese aikido and judo teacher and the Second Director of Japan Aikido Association after the death of Kenji Tomiki.

He was born as Hideo Tozawa in a village called Nakagawa in Akita prefecture. In 1936, he adopted his wife's name upon marriage in deference to her fame as a young teacher of the Japanese harp.

The year 1931 was pivotal for Hideo Ohba. He was awarded 2nd dan in judo, met Kenji Tomiki and was called up to serve in the military which he did with distinction. His professional and personal relationship with Kenji Tomiki became very close. He was awarded 5th dan in judo in 1933. From 1940 he was teaching judo at Kenkoku University in Manchukuo.

In 1942 he was awarded 5th dan by Morihei Ueshiba, the founder of aikido, who used him as uke during the budo festival on the 10th anniversary of the foundation of Manchukuo. It was during this demonstration that he gained notoriety by attacking Ueshiba for real. He is quoted as saying Ueshiba was a little stiff but he knew then he was in the presence of a true master.

The following year he was awarded 6th dan in aikido, his 6th dan in judo was awarded in 1950.

During the 60's Hideo Ohba lead the effort for the creation of many of the koryu (old school) no kata forms from dai-ichi (first) to dai-roku (sixth) in order to work on techniques for demonstrations and other purposes (i.e. preservation, self-defense) other than randori. After his initial organization he presented his work to Kenji Tomiki who gave advice and corrections which was added to the kata.

In 1978 he was awarded 9th dan by the Japan Aikido Association. He was also considered adept at kendo, naginata and iai.

In February 1986, Ohba died. After his death Fusae Tomiki (Kenji Tomiki's widow) became the 3rd Chairman of the Japan Aikido Association

== Sources ==
- Aikido Journal Encyclopedia entry for Hideo Ohba
- Aikido Journal Encyclopedia Article on Hideo Ohba written by Fumiaki Shishida (Part 1)
- Aikido Journal Encyclopedia Article on Hideo Ohba written by Fumiaki Shishida (Part 2)
