= Zero Range Combat =

Modern martial art

ZERO RANGE COMBAT
- Also known as: Zerorenjikonbatto; Rei kyori sentō-jutsu; Zero-Distance Combat
- Focus: Hybrid, self-defence, CQB/CQC
- Country of origin: Japan
- Creator: Yoshitaka Inagawa
- Parenthood: Kobudō; Muay Boran; Combat Sambo; Systema; Eskrima; Jieitaikakutōjutsu
- Official website: ZERO RANGE COMBAT official homepage

Zero Range Combat (Japanese: ゼロレンジコンバット, Zerorenjikonbatto, also referred to as 零距離戦闘術, Rei kyori sentō-jutsu, which translates to Zero Range Combat) is a Japanese martial art inspired by military combatives.

The founder is Yoshitaka Inagawa, who is publicly referred to as "sentō-sha" (戦闘者, eng. battler or combatant), and "master instructor" (マスターインストラクター masutāinsutorakutā) to his martial arts peers. The name "sentō-sha" is different from "martial arts" and/or "fighter" in that it means a person who is particular about military "battle", referring closer to something akin to "military artsman" (兵法者, Heihōsha).

== History ==
ZRC gained prominence in Japan when it was used in High&Low The Red Rain and Re:Born.

== Curriculum ==
While ZRC trains anyone learning the martial art via bare hands, knives, swords, batons, flashlights and handguns, the use of rifles is also included in its curriculum.

ZRC also learned the technique of dodging flying bullets.

=== Techniques ===
ZRC was inspired by Inagawa learning Kobudō, Muay Boran, Sambo, Systema, Eskrima, and elements from Jieitaikakutōjutsu.

== Use ==
Inagawa has provided self-defence guidance to the members of the JGSDF Central Readiness Regiment.

== See also ==
- Jieitaikakutōjutsu
