= Yoseikan =

Name given to a dojo

Yoseikan (養正館, Yōseikan) was the name given to Minoru Mochizuki's dojo built in November 1931 in Shizuoka, Japan.

== The Dojo ==
The brother and friends of Master Minoru Mochizuki built this dojo for him while he was recovering from pleurisy and pulmonary tuberculosis. When the dojo was built, a friend of the Mochizuki family (a philosophy teacher) called it Yōseikan. Mochizuki immediately adopted the name since it means "the place to cultivate truth/righteousness". It reflected his teacher's ideals and it reinforced the positive attitude of "Mutual welfare and prosperity" he had always promoted. The official opening of the dojo was held in November 1931 and many dignitaries from Tokyo, including Morihei Ueshiba, Admiral Isamu Takeshita, and General Makoto Miura attended. It had to be rebuilt after World War II during which it was burnt down.

The Yōseikan served as the centre for many martial arts in Shizuoka until the 1970s. The martial arts taught at the dojo included Aikido, Judo, Karate, and Tenshin Shoden Katori Shinto Ryu. In the 1970s it became the home to Mochizuki's composite martial art, Yoseikan Budo.

== See also ==
- Yoseikan Budo
- Yoseikan Aikido
- Yoseikan Karate
