= Gyokushin-ryū Jujutsu =

Gyokushin-ryū
- Ko-ryū

Foundation
- Founder: Unknown
- Date founded: ~1700

Current information
- Current headmaster: None (extinct after Sanjuro Oshima)

Arts taught
- Art: Description
- Jujutsu: Hybrid

Ancestor schools
- Unknown but possibly Daitō-ryū Aiki-jūjutsu

Descendant schools
- Yoseikan budō Gyokushin Ryu Aikido; Nihon Tai Jitsu

Gyokushin-ryū was a koryu jujutsu style known for its extensive arsenal of sutemiwaza (sacrifice throws). It shared many techniques with Daitō-ryū Aiki-jūjutsu. Yoseikan budō partially descends from this style.
