= Suwariwaza =

Suwariwaza (座り技) is the generic name for techniques performed in the seated stance in traditional Japanese (koryū) martial arts. The word waza means technique. In aikido and judo, suwariwaza techniques are performed by practitioners seated opposite to each other in the seiza position, the formal style of sitting in Japanese culture. In iaido, a single practitioner starts in many cases from suwariwaza, and executes sword techniques from the seated stance, though not necessarily from a static and immobile position.

== History ==
Suwariwaza originated in the martial culture of the samurai who were expected to respond to various attackers from the seated position, with the implication that these codified techniques helped in the improvement of body stability, the maintenance of the ki (the Japanese equivalent of the Chinese Qi), balance, and strengthening kokyu-ho (breathing power). The practice of techniques in suwariwaza deprives the practitioners of the use of their legs while performing the same basic techniques they use while standing. It forces them to learn how to throw and take down an attacker using leverage, proper breathing, and hip action leading to sliding movements that compensate for the lack of leg support and strength. As the practitioner executing the move has to stay upright, suwariwaza techniques differ from grappling moves in judo and forms of wrestling.

Suwariwaza contrasts with hanmi handachi waza (a person sitting in seiza defending against a standing attacker) over the tachiwaza (standing techniques, which comprise the stance in which the majority of standing techniques and training are performed in aikido, and where the attacker and the defender standing). These three postural forms historically bear reference to the transitional boundaries between kenjutsu and jujutsu in Japanese sword-fighting arts, depending on the initial distance between the combatants. For example, the tachiwaza (literally "standing meeting") encounter took place when the swordsmen began standing only a pace or two apart; to advance forward from the tachiai, the swordsmen held their weapons before them and slide or step forward, bringing their blades directly together just above the hand guards. The fluid transition from tachiwaza to hanmi handachi and suwariwaza emphasized the preparedness of the samurai for all occasions of combat.

When perfected, suwariwaza can be performed while standing, for they focus on the moving the entire body of the practitioner, and not individual limbs, through shikkō (a knee-walking movement from the seated position, possible only through moving the hips, the knees, together with the entire body). In aikido, these techniques are preserved and practiced in the belief that the movement of hips and the body they occasion, especially the movement of the body as an entire unit, is valuable to the training of balance of the body and mind of the practitioner who learns to focus on skill than brute force. Some styles of aikido, like Kobayashi aikido, attach more emphasis to the perfecting of suwariwaza techniques; others pay equal emphasis on all the three. Suwariwaza techniques are also common in iaido kata forms practiced by the Musō Shinden-ryū and other koryū.
