= Kodokan Goshin Jutsu =

Martial arts - self-defence

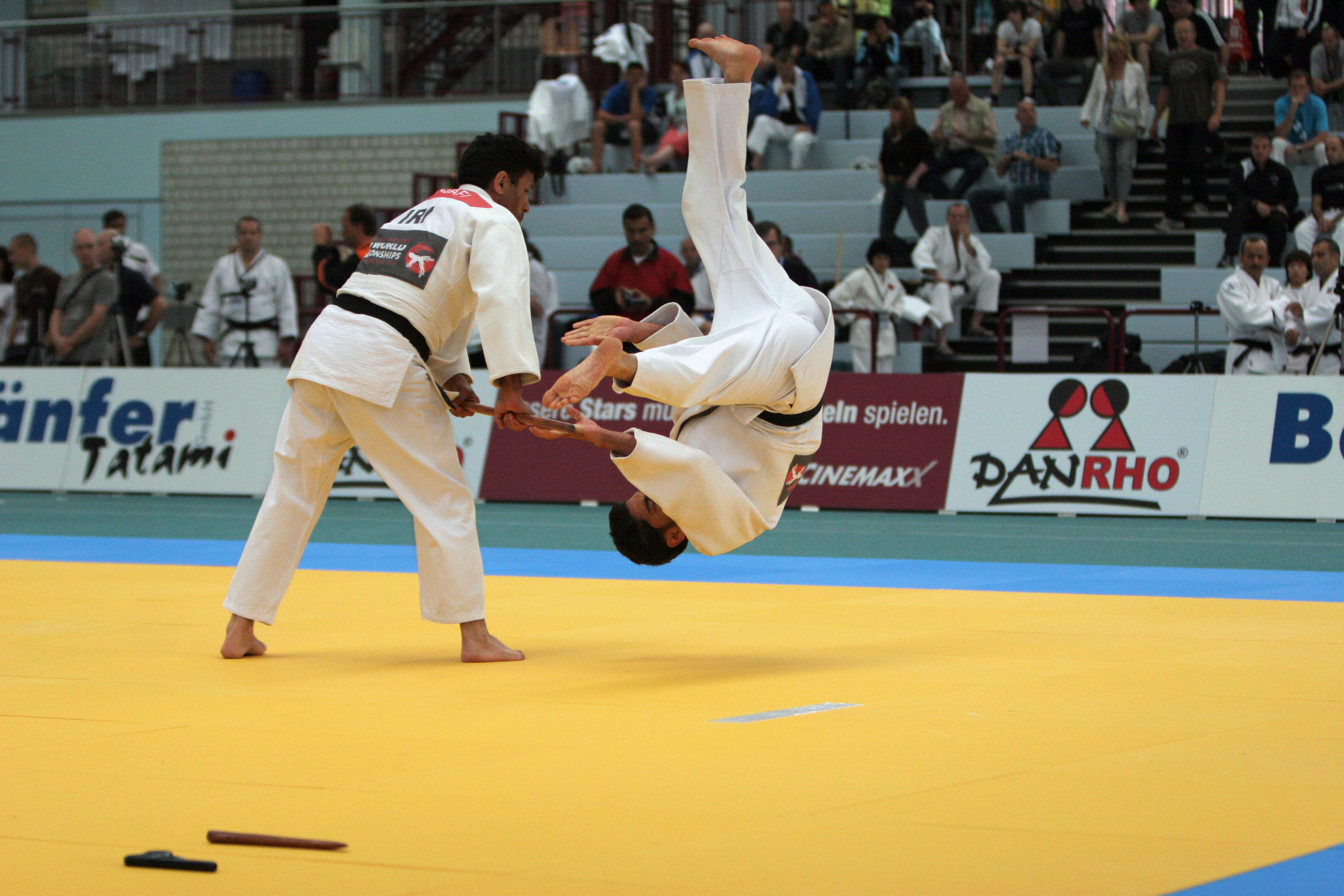
- Classification: Kata
- Sub classification: Kodokan kata
- Kodokan: Yes

Technique name
- Rōmaji: Kōdōkan goshinjutsu
- Japanese: 講道館護身術
- English: Kodokan skills of self-defence

Kōdōkan Goshin Jutsu or Kōdōkan goshinjutsu (講道館護身術; Kodokan skills of self-defence) was, before the introduction of the Kodomo-no-kata, the most recent judo kata of Kodokan - being established in 1956. Compared to Kime no kata it is a more modern set of self-defence techniques. Instead of attacks with swords, the kata contains defences against attacks with stick and pistol.

The 21 techniques are named after and grouped by ukes attack. The first two groups are unarmed attacks (toshu no bu), from close distance when uke holds tori, and from a distance when uke punches or kicks. The last three groups are attacks with weapons (buki no bu): with a dagger, a stick and with a pistol.

Most of the techniques tori uses for defence are considered illegal in judo competitions (shiai) and randori, and are therefore not known to many judoka. Beside the strikes, the wrist locks kote-hineri and kote-gaeshi belong to those techniques, which are two common known aikido techniques.

== Techniques ==
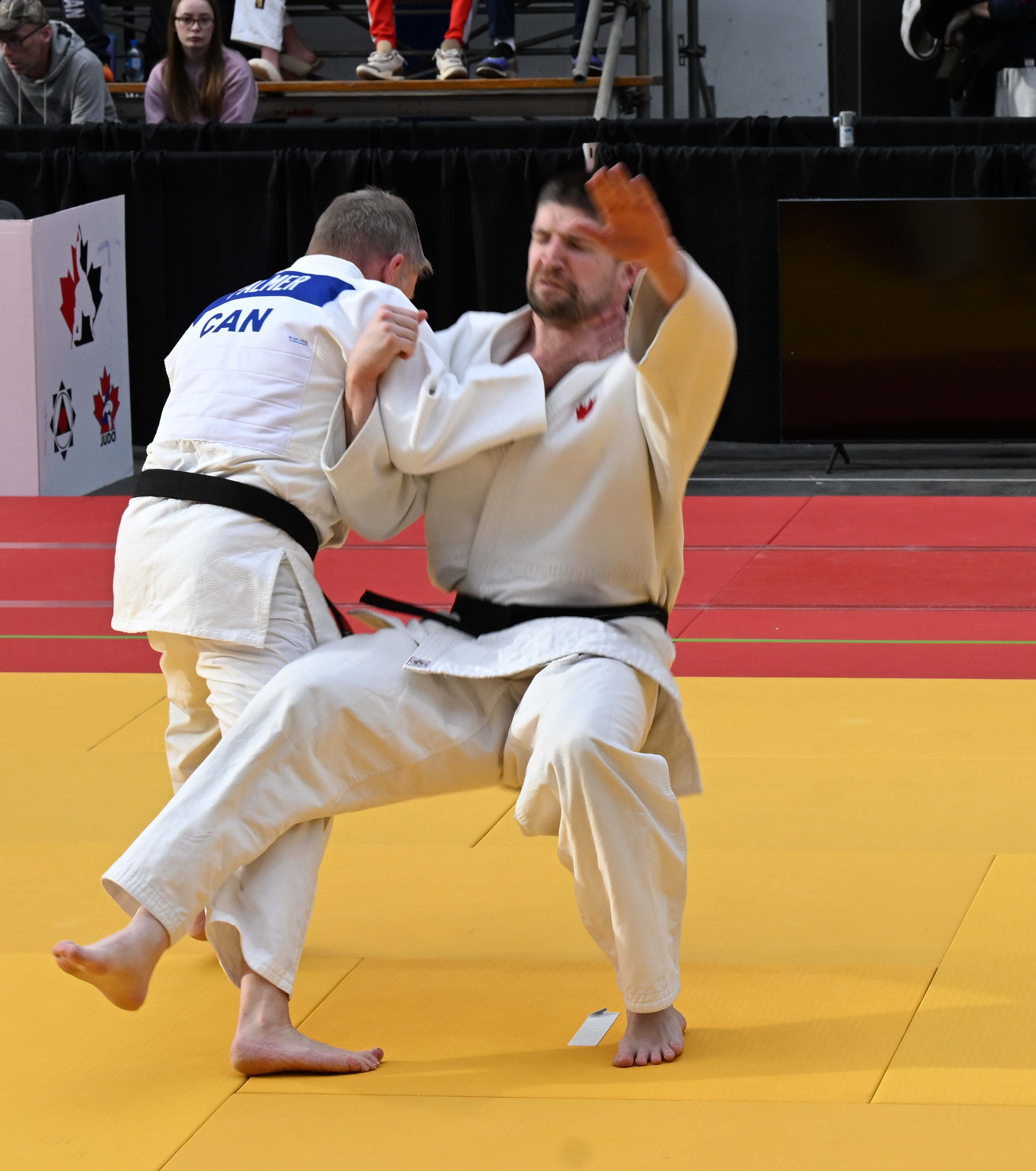
Naname-uchi

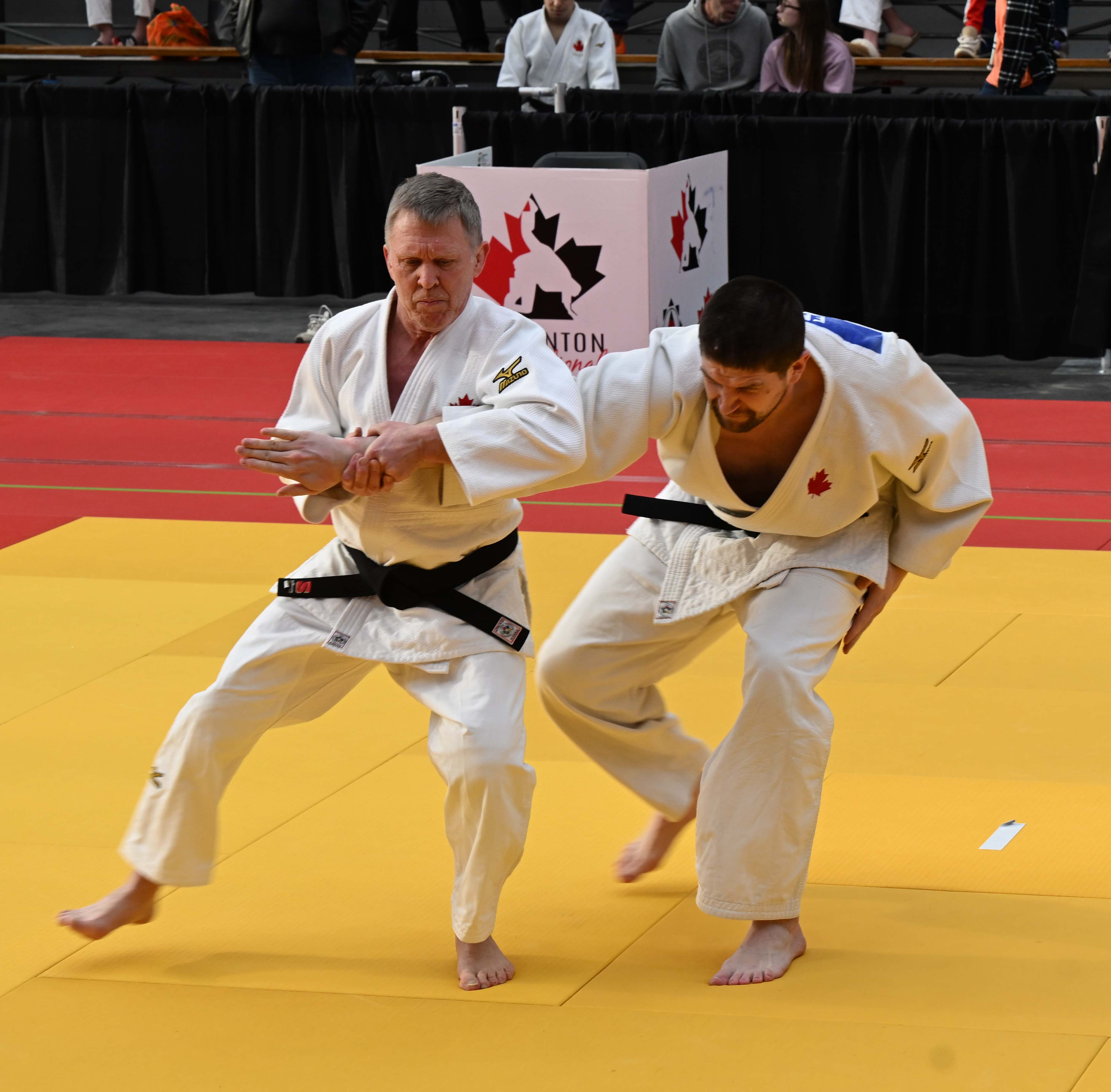
Kataude-dori

- Unarmed attack
  - When held
    - Ryote-dori (Two-Hand Hold)
    - Hidari-eri-dori (Left-lapel Hold)
    - Migi-eri-dori (Right-lapel Hold)
    - Kataude-dori (Single-Arm Hold)
    - Ushiro-eri-dori (Collar Hold from Behind)
    - Ushiro-jime (Choke from Behind)
    - Kakae-dori (Seize and Hold from Behind)
  - At a distance
    - Naname-uchi (Slanting Strike)
    - Ago-tsuki (Uppercut)
    - Gammen-tsuki (Thrust-Punch to Face)
    - Mae-geri (Front Kick)
    - Yoko-geri (Side Kick)
- Armed attack
  - Dagger
    - Tsukkake (Thrust)
    - Choku-tsuki (Straight Thrust)
    - Naname-tsuki (Slanting Stab)
  - Stick
    - Furiage (Upswing)
    - Furioroshi (Downswing)
    - Morote-tsuki (Two-Hand Thrust)
  - Pistol
    - Shomen-zuke (Pistol at the Abdomen)
    - Koshi-gamae (Pistol Held at the Side)
    - Haimen-zuke (Pistol against the Back)

== Sources ==
- Jigoro Kano, Kodokan Judo, Kodansha International.
- Judo Info: Techniques with illustrative drawings.
