= Kenji Tomiki =

Japanese martial artist

- Born: March 15, 1900
- Died: December 25, 1979 (aged 79)
- Native name: 富木 謙治 Tomiki Kenji
- Nationality: (Japan) Japanese
- Style: Shodokan Aikido (founder); Aikido, Judo
- Teachers: Jigoro Kano, Morihei Ueshiba
- Rank: 8th dan Judo; 8th dan Aikido

Kenji Tomiki (富木 謙治, Tomiki Kenji; March 15, 1900 – December 25, 1979) was a Japanese martial artist who specialized in aikido and judo family of martial arts. He was a pedagogue of martial arts theory (武道論, Budo-ron). He is the founder of Japan Aikido Association and the competitive aikido (aikido kyogi) style.

Tomiki was a professor at Kenkoku University in Manchuria and later at the Faculty of Education at Waseda University. Tomiki is credited in devising and introducing new forms of Randori practice in Aikido. He founded his own Aikido system, which has many differences from other Aikido styles, mainly in randori training, and is referred by several names including Tomiki Aikido, Shodokan Aikido and Sport Aikido.

== History ==
=== Early life and World War II ===
Kenji Tomiki was born on March 15, 1900 (Meiji 33) in Kakunodate, Akita. He was the as the eldest son of the Shosuke Tomiki - a landholder. Japanese-style painter Hoan Hirafuku was his maternal grandfather.

Circa 1910, Tomiki began practising at the Kodokan, under Judo founder Jigoro Kano. In 1914, he entered Akita Prefectural Yokote Junior High School (predecessor of the current Akita Prefectural Yokote High School). He was active in the judo club while he was in school. In 1919, he obtained the first dan level of judo.

He actively practised Judo, despite Jigoro Kano's advanced age and declining health. Despite Tomiki himself being in good health, he contracted tuberculosis and was bedridden for three years before recovering. In 1924, he enrolls at the Faculty of Political Science and Economics at Waseda University and would continue training Judo, both at Waseda Judo Club and the Kodokan, reaching the rank of 4th Dan in Judo by the end of his senior year.

In early 1926, he encountered the founder of aikido Morihei Ueshiba. Fascinated by Ueshiba's technique, as well as being encouraged by Kano to explore Ueshiba's martial knowledge, Tomiki introduced himself and became one Ueshiba's early students.

In 1927, he went on to graduate school and was promoted to Judo 5th Dan. In 1929, got a job at Miyagi Prefecture Electricity Bureau. In same year, he represented Miyagi Prefecture in the first judo tournament held in front of the Emperor—this tournament became the All Japan Tournament the following year. In 1931, he was assigned to Akita Prefectural Kakunodate Junior High School (predecessor of the current Akita Prefectural Kakunodate High School), in his birth town.

From 1936 or 1937 till the end of the Second World War, under orders of General Hideki Tojo, Tomiki lived in Manchukuo (Manchuria) where he taught aikibudo (an early name for aikido) to the Kempeitai of the Kwantung Army. In 1938 he became an assistant professor at Kenkoku University in Manchukuo. In 1940, he was the first 8th dan black belt to be awarded by Morihei Ueshiba in Aikido history. In the same year, Tomiki began re-evaluating Aikido and combining its practices with that of Judo's, which would eventually lead to the creation of his own Tomiki-Ryu/Shodokan Aikido. In 1941, became a professor at Kenkoku University. Following the surrender of Imperial Japan in 1945, Tomiki was detained by Soviet Red Army troops and was held in a three-year internment by the Soviet Union. It is there that Tomiki developed the unsoku and tegatana exercises to stay physically able for Aikido.

=== Post-war ===
Tomiki was released from internment in 1948 and subsequently returned to Japan. In 1949, he became a part-time lecturer at Waseda University's Physical Education Department. He would teach Judo and Aikido for many years at Waseda University.

In 1952, he was selected as one of the members of the Kodokan Goshinjutsu Enactment Committee. Tomiki is perhaps best known in the judo world for his influence in the developing of Kodokan Goshin Jutsu kata. His work Judo is considered a classic. The aikido appendix to the book is thought to be the earliest English language text on aikido.

In 1953, Tomiki along with 9 other martial art instructors were selected to tour US Air Force bases in the United States and was thus the first aikido instructor to visit the US.

In 1954, he became a economics professor at Waseda University. After becoming a professor, Tomiki formulated and expanded his theories concerning both kata based training methods and a particular form of free-style fighting which would put him at odds with much, but not all, of the aikido world.

It was this action on the part of Tomiki of attempting to convert aikido into a sport that led to a schism with the founder Morihei Ueshiba and the Aikikai. Tomiki was urged by the Aikikai to adopt a different name for his art other than "aikido" if he intended to introduce such a system of competition. Convinced of the need to modernize aikido, he stood his ground and persisted in his efforts to evolve a viable form of competition.

Between 1955 and 1959, he helped formalize the Self-Defense Forces unarmed fighting system (Jieitaikakutojutsu).

In 1958, Waseda University Aikido Club was established and became the first director. This is also considered the de facto start of his own style of Aikido, called Tomiki-Ryu, which was later renamed to Shodokan Aikido.

Also in 1958, he published two major books on Aikido and Judo, them being "Aikidō nyūmon" (『合気道入門』 - Eng. "Introduction to Aikido"). and the Kodokan Goshin-jutsu, which would serve as the most important book on the Kodokan Goshin Jutsu Judo kata.

In 1960, Tomiki had formalized aikidō kyōgi/competitive Aikido. In 1964, he established "Physical Education Specialization" in the Department of Education, Faculty of Education, Waseda University, and became the chief professor.

In 1967, Tomiki opened his Shodokan honbu Dojo which he used as a testing ground for his theories on aikido and competition. Tomiki followed Ueshiba as the Aikido division head of the Kokusai Budoin-International Martial Arts Federation (IMAF Japan). In 1970, Tomiki retired from Waseda University and, in the same year, presided over the first All-Japan Student Aikido Tournament. The basic rules for the holding of aikido tournaments had been worked out by this time in what would become an ongoing experiment to develop a viable form of competitive aikido.

In 1971, Kodokan awarded Tomiki with the 8th Dan blackbelt. Then, in 1974, he founded the Japan Aikido Association (JAA) from an earlier organization of the same name to promote his theories. In 1975, he became Vice Chairman of the Japanese Academy of Budo.

Tomiki set up a new dojo for the Shodokan in Osaka on March 28, 1976, with the support of Masaharu Uchiyama, Vice-chairman of the J.A.A. This dojo was intended to function as the headquarters of the Japan Aikido Association and Tomiki served as its first director. The current head of the dojo and chief instructor of the Shodokan Aikido Federation is Tetsuro Nariyama.

Professor Tomiki died from complications of colorectal cancer on December 25, 1979.

== Known martial arts disciples ==
- Ōba Hideo
- Teramoto Shōichi
- Uchiyama (Miyake) Junkichi
- Nariyama Tetsurō
- Morikawa Sumiharu
- Shishida Fumiaki
- Miyake Tsunako
- Inoue Takeshi
- Kogure Hiroaki
- Takemoto Yoshio
- Satō Tadayuki
- Obuchi Keizo
- Suzuki Kunio
- Robert Dziubla

== Writing ==
- Chosaku jūdō taisō (1954 - 柔道体操 - Judo gymnastics)
- Aikidō nyūmon (1958 - 合気道入門 - Introduction to Aikido )
- Shin aikidō tekisuto (1964 - 新合気道テキスト - New Aikido Textbook)

== See also ==
- Kodokan Goshin Jutsu
- Jieitaikakutojutsu
