= Minoru Mochizuki =

Japanese aikidoka

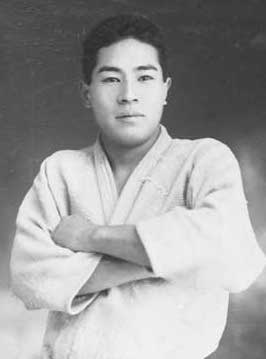
- Mochizuki c. 1930
- Born: April 7, 1907; Shizuoka Prefecture, Japan
- Died: May 30, 2003 (aged 96); Aix-en-Provence, France
- Occupation: Martial Artist

Minoru Mochizuki (望月 稔, Mochizuki Minoru; April 7, 1907 – May 30, 2003) was a Japanese martial artist who founded the dojo Yoseikan. He was a 10th dan in Aikido, 9th dan in Jujutsu, 8th dan in Iaido, 8th dan in Judo, 8th dan in Kobudo, 5th dan in Kendo, 5th dan in Karate, and a 5th dan in Jojutsu.

Mochizuki was one of the direct students of Judo founder Jigoro Kano, Aikido founder Morihei Ueshiba and Gichin Funakoshi, founder of Shotokan Karate.

Believing that the martial arts had become distorted by specialization into separate disciplines or transformed into sports, Mochizuki achievement was to assemble back the major techniques of the Japanese martial tradition into a single structure, as it was once practised. He oversaw the development of the system from his home in Shizuoka, Japan, where his dojo, the Yoseikan, was often visited by martial arts practitioners from all over the world.

== Early life ==
On April 7, 1907, Mochizuki was born in Shizuoka, Japan. Mochizuki, began by training in kendo at the age of five, at his grandfather's dojo in Shizuoka.

== Career ==
In 1925, Mochizuki began judo and joined the Kodokan where he became an outstanding competitor. Under the tutelage of Jigoro Kano, the founder of judo, as well as the renowned Sanpo Toku, Mochizuki became the youngest member of the Kobudo Kenkyukai – an organization for the study, preservation and development of classical martial arts – established within the Kodokan. Here he practised among others Katori Shinto-ryu. In 1930, he was sent by Jigoro Kano to study aikijujutsu with Morihei Ueshiba. He was the uchideshi of Morihei Ueshiba at the Kobukan dojo for one year before opening his own dojo in Shizuoka City in 1931.

He was awarded two Daito-Ryu scrolls by Ueshiba in June 1932 ("Goshinyo no te" and "Hiden ogi no koto"). He spent eight years in Mongolia where he was an active educator and entrepreneur of projects to improve communications and irrigation. His idea of combating communism with the application of the principles of "mutual welfare and prosperity" and of "the best use of energy" of Jigoro Kano contributed to the development of his region. His irrigation project was completed after the Second World War by the Chinese authorities. Mochizuki was the first to teach aikido in the West when he traveled in France from 1951 to 1953 as a judo teacher. He was the 3rd Aikido Division head of the Kokusai Budoin-International Martial Arts Federation (IMAF Japan) after Ueshiba and Tomiki. He taught at the dojo of Shizuoka until nearly the end of the last millennium and spent the last years of his life in France with his son Hiroo.

== Personal ==
On May 30, 2003, Minoru Mochizuki died in Aix-en-Provence, France, at the age of 96.

His son, Hiroo Mochizuki, introduced karate in France and founded martial art Yoseikan Budō.

== Sources ==
- Stanley Pranin, ed. Aikido masters: prewar students of Morihei Ueshiba. Tokyo: Aiki News. 1993. ISBN 4-900586-14-5 publisher
