= Shodokan Aikido =

Style of Japanese martial arts

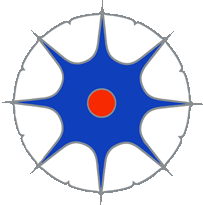
- The Shodokan Aikido symbol
- Also known as: Tomiki Aikido
- Date founded: 1958 (Note: Upon formation of the Waseda University Aikido Club.) or 1967 (Note: When Kenji Tomiki founded his first dojo.)
- Country of origin: Japan
- Founder: Kenji Tomiki (富木 謙治, Tomiki Kenji, 15 March 1900–25 December 1979)
- Arts taught: Aikido
- Practitioners: Tetsuro Nariyama, Fumiaki Shishida

Shodokan Aikido (昭道館合気道, Shōdōkan Aikidō) is the style of Aikido founded by Kenji Tomiki. Shodokan Aikido is sometimes referred to as 合気道競技 (Aikido Kyogi) meaning "Competitive Aikido" or "Sport Aikido" because of its use of regular competitions.

The style itself could arguably have been founded with the formation of the Waseda University Aikido Club in 1958, although Tomiki didn't actually name his style Shodokan until 1976. It was in 1967 when Kenji Tomiki established the Shodokan hombu dojo in Osaka, Japan, to teach, train and promote his style. In 1974, Kenji Tomiki founded the Japan Aikido Association (NPO Japan Aikido Association). Since it was certified as a specified non-profit organization (NPO corporation) by the Cabinet Office in 2005, the official name was changed to "Specified Non-Profit Organization Japan Aikido Association". As of 2018, Masako Tomiki is the current chairman of JAA.

Today, Shodokan Aikido is organised with two major groups, the Japan Aikido Association (JAA) and the Shodokan Aikido Federation (SAF).

== Overview ==
Shodokan places more emphasis on free-form randori sparring than most other styles of aikido. The training method requires a balance between a randori training method and the more stylized and traditional kata training along with a well-developed set of training drills both specific for randori and for general aikido development. The participation in actual shiai (competitive randori) very much depends on the club with greater emphasis being found in the university clubs, although randori is core to all Shodokan clubs.

== Past directors of Shodokan Aikido ==
- First Director Kenji Tomiki (1967-1979)
- Second Director Hideo Ohba (1979–1986)

== Shihan ==
Within the JAA there were two Shihan: Tetsuro Nariyama and Fumiaki Shishida. Nariyama as the technical director of the JAA and chief instructor of the Shodokan hombu dojo in Osaka, Japan. Shishida is Professor of Intellectual History of the Japanese Martial Arts at Waseda University in Tokyo. Together, they wrote a key monograph, in Japanese, entitled "Aikido Kyougi", which describes the history of, and many technical details about, the style of aikido propounded by Tomiki. This book, first published in 1985, was subsequently translated into English under the title, "Aikido: Tradition and the Competitive Edge". Nariyama Shihan has also produced a further book, "Aikido Randori", describing the practice system of randori within aikido.

In recent years, Sato Tadayuki was made Shihan of Waseda University Aikido Club. He, along with the now late Kenshi Uno, of Shikoku Japan, created Shidokan, with the blessing of Shishida Shihan. This system follows the same teachings of Tomiki, but with different emphasis, a return to Tomiki's earliest methods. Tomiki gave his art the name Shodokan, and many people were concerned with the introduction of a new name Shidokan. However this is just to show the various paths available within Tomiki's aikido.

As of 2012, the division between Nariyama Shihan and Shishida Shihan grew into a situation where the two of them remaining within a single organization became an untenable position. Thus Nariyama Shihan decided to resolve any conflict by resigning from the JAA and creating a new organization known as Shodokan Aikido Renmei (also known as Shodokan Aikido Federation). This effectively was an official split of the Shodokan Aikido world into two. The JAA now refer to Shodokan Aikido as "Tomiki Aikido". However, because Tomiki Shihan emphatically was against the use of his name being attached to his system of practice, the JAA also commonly refers to the system as "The Aikido of Kenji Tomiki Sensei".

== Kata ==
Shodokan defines several kata. Some of the more important kata are listed below.

=== Junanahon ===
Randori no kata is the basic kata set for Shodokan Aikido. Junanahon consists of 17 basic techniques, which, with their variations, are legal within Shodokan randori. They are broken down into four different categories: Atemi, Hiji, Tekubi and Uki. Kenji Tomiki thought for many years about the construction of the 17 techniques as he omitted techniques from the old styles that he deemed too complex or too dangerous for competition.

==== Atemi Waza ====
The Atemi Waza is a set of five techniques that are classified as striking techniques.

- Shomen Ate: Strike from the Front
- Aigamae Ate: Strike from Same Posture
- Gyakugamae Ate: Strike from Reverse Posture
- Gedan Ate: Strike from Low Level
- Ushiro Ate: Strike from Behind

==== Hiji Waza ====
The Hiji Waza is a set of five techniques that are classified as elbow techniques.

- Oshi Taoshi: Pushing Topple
- Ude Gaeshi: Arm Reversal
- Hiki Taoshi: Pulling Topple
- Ude Hineri: Arm Twist
- Waki Gatame: Fixing the Side

==== Tekubi Waza ====
The Tekubi Waza is a set of four techniques that are classified as wrist techniques.

- Kote Hineri: Wrist Twist
- Kote Gaeshi: Wrist Reversal
- Tenkai Kote Hineri: Rotating Wrist Twist
- Tenkai Kote Gaeshi: Rotating Wrist Reversal

==== Uki Waza ====
The Uki Waza is a set of three techniques that are classified as floating techniques.

- Mae Otoshi: Front Drop
- Sumi Otoshi: Corner Drop
- Hiki Otoshi: Pulling Drop

=== Koryu Goshin no Kata ===
Old stream self defense kata, includes many techniques that harken back to pre-war aikido (when the art was still taught as Daito-ryu aiki-jujutsu). This set of 50 techniques is sometimes referred to as the Koryu dai san and includes weapons as well as empty-hand techniques. Suwari Waza: 4 techniques Hanza Handachi: 4 techniques Tachi Waza: 8 techniques Tanto dori: 8 techniques Tachi dori: 5 techniques Yari dori: 5 techniques Yari wo kumitsukareta: 8 techniques Kumi Tachi: 8 techniques

=== Nage no kata ===
A set of 14 throwing techniques: 7 direct (omote) and 7 more circular and fluid (ura). This sequence is actually the first part of Koryu dai yon which includes 11 more techniques.

=== Goshin Ho ===
Self-defense techniques several of which are part of the curriculum for yondan and up.

== Competition ==
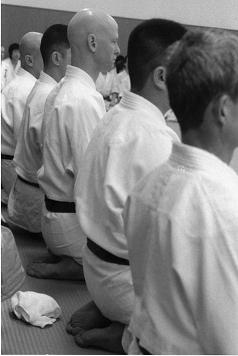
Preparation for grading at Shodokan hombu dojo

Competitions take the form of tanto randori or toshu randori, and also embu (演武) in which pairs (tori and uke) are judged on their kata. Toshu randori (徒手乱取) is barehanded, and both practitioners are expected to perform techniques on one another and attempt to resist and counter each other's techniques. The appearance of this form is heavily influenced by judo randori with a few changes designed to enhance the use of aikido technique (for example, one is not allowed to grasp the opponent's keikogi).

In tanto randori (短刀乱取), there is a designated attacker (tantō) and a designated empty-handed defender (toshu). The attacker attempts to stab the defender with a training knife (usually rubber or stuffed) while the defender attempts, with any of seventeen basic aikido techniques, to throw or perform joint-locks on the attacker. Tantō is expected to resist or counter with the first five techniques. In competition, the roles switch, with competitors having the same amount of time with and without the knife. In both these forms of randori, the traditional separation between the performer of technique (tori) and the receiver of technique (uke) no longer exists, as either participant may throw the opponent.

=== Scoring ===
==== Credits ====
- Tanto tsukiari (短刀突きあり) - 1 point - Awarded for a successful tantō strike. For the strike to count, the tantō must land on the upper half of the torso. The arm must be extended, the strike should be perpendicular to the attacker's body, and the attacker must be moving forward, finished with good balance. Glancing hits do not count. Obviously, this does not apply to toshu randori.
- Yuko (有効) - 1 point - Awarded for a balance break, or for making your opponent retreat out of the designated area.
- Waza-ari (技あり) - 2 points - Awarded for a full throw or lock, but losing good posture and balance.
- Ippon (一本) - 4 points - Awarded for a full throw or lock, keeping good posture and balance.

==== Penalties ====
- Shido - 1/2 point - Awarded to the opponent when a competitor commits minor violation. Shido are only counted in pairs. Examples of shido are:
  - Dogi-mochi shido - Grabbing hold of the gi.
  - Taisabaki shido - Failure to dodge properly, e.g. by swatting the knife away instead of moving out of its path or receiving a glancing blow.
  - Tanto shido - Failure to mind the knife: tanto may receive a tanto shido if he or she drops or loses control of the knife; toshu may receive a tanto shido if he or she allows the tanto to be pressed against their body for three seconds.
- Chui - 1 point - Awarded to the opponent when a competitor commits a major violation. In American tournaments, 2 chui end the match.

=== World Championships ===
The Aikido World Championships are held every two years, rotating between Japan and a foreign location.

== International Instruction ==
Instructors from Shodokan Hombu regularly teach internationally. Currently the main traveling instructors are Tetsuro Nariyama (9th Dan), Ryuichi Omori (7th Dan), Sekio Endo (7th Dan) and Shinnosuke Sakai (7th Dan).
