= Randori =

Free-style practice in Japanese martial arts

Japanese name
- Kanji: 乱取り
- Hiragana: らんどり
Transcriptions
- Revised Hepburn: randori

Randori (乱取り) is a term used in Japanese martial arts to describe free-style practice (sparring). The term denotes an exercise in 取り tori, applying technique to a random ( 乱 ran) succession of uke attacks.

The actual connotation of randori depends on the martial art it is used in. In judo, jujutsu, and Shodokan aikido, among others, it most often refers to one-on-one sparring where partners attempt to resist and counter each other's techniques. In other styles of aikido, in particular Aikikai, it refers to a form of practice in which a designated aikidoka defends against multiple attackers in quick succession without knowing how they will attack or in what order.

== In Japan ==
The term is used in aikido, judo, and Brazilian jiu-jitsu dojos outside Japan. In Japan, this form of practice is called taninzu-gake (多人数掛け), which literally means multiple attackers.

== In judo ==
The term was described by Jigoro Kano, the founder of judo, in a speech at the 1932 Los Angeles Olympic Games: "Randori, meaning "free exercise", is practiced under conditions of actual contest. It includes throwing, choking, holding the opponent down, and bending or twisting of the arms. The two combatants may use whatever methods they like provided they do not hurt each other and obey the rules of judo concerning etiquette, which are essential to its proper working."

There are 2 types of randori.

== In aikido ==
Most commonly, one or more attackers rush toward tori and try to grab both elbows. The tori's goal is to perform quick tai sabaki and avoid hurting the attackers as much as possible. Therefore, the tori does not punch, but rather tries to avoid the attacks or to throw the attackers. In some aikido styles, the attack is free, and so are the techniques applied, as long as they follow the principles of aikido.

== In karate ==
Although in karate the word kumite is usually reserved for sparring, some schools also employ the term randori with regard to "mock-combat" in which both karateka move with speed, parrying and attacking with all four limbs (including knees and elbows). In these schools, the distinction between randori and kumite is that in randori, the action is uninterrupted when a successful technique is applied. (Also known as ju kumite or soft sparring.)

== In ninjutsu ==
Randori is also practiced in Bujinkan ninjutsu and usually represented to the practitioner when he reaches the "Shodan" level. In ninjutsu, randori puts the practitioner in a position where he is armed or unarmed and is attacked by multiple attackers.

== See also ==
- Kata
- Sparring
- Randori-no-kata
