= The Ballad of Narayama =

The Ballad of Narayama may refer to:

- The Ballad of Narayama (short story), a 1956 literary work by Shichirō Fukazawa
- The Ballad of Narayama (1958 film)
- The Ballad of Narayama (1983 film)
