= Otoya Yamaguchi =

Japanese assassin (1943–1960)

- 山口 二矢
- Otoya Yamaguchi in May 1960
- Born: 22 February 1943; Taitō, Japan
- Died: 2 November 1960 (aged 17); Nerima, Tokyo, Japan
- Cause of death: Suicide by hanging
- Resting place: Aoyama Cemetery, Minami-Aoyama, Tokyo
- Known for: Assassination of Inejirō Asanuma

Details
- Date: 12 October 1960
- Killed: 1
- Weapon: Wakizashi

Otoya Yamaguchi (山口 二矢, Yamaguchi Otoya; 22 February 1943 – 2 November 1960) was a Japanese radical anti-communist and ultranationalist youth who assassinated Inejirō Asanuma, chairman of the Japan Socialist Party, on 12 October 1960.

Yamaguchi rushed the stage and stabbed Asanuma with a wakizashi-like short sword while Asanuma was participating in a televised election debate at Hibiya Public Hall in Tokyo. Yamaguchi, who was 17 years of age at the time, had been a member of Bin Akao's far-right Greater Japan Patriotic Party, but had resigned earlier that year, just prior to the assassination. After being arrested and interrogated, Yamaguchi committed suicide while in a detention facility.

Yamaguchi became a hero and a martyr to Japanese far-right groups, who as of 2022, have continued to hold commemorations to this day. Yamaguchi's actions inspired a number of copycat crimes, including the Shimanaka incident in 1961, and inspired Nobel Prize-winning novelist Kenzaburō Ōe's novellas Seventeen and Death of a Political Youth. A photograph of the assassination taken by Japanese photojournalist Yasushi Nagao won World Press Photo of the Year for 1960 and the 1961 Pulitzer Prize.

== Early life ==
Yamaguchi was born on 22 February 1943 in Yanaka, Taitō, Tokyo. He was the second son of Shinpei Yamaguchi, who by 1960 would become a high-ranking officer in the Japan Ground Self-Defense Force, and was the maternal grandson of the famous writer Namiroku Murakami, well known for his violent novels glorifying the chivalric code of Japanese organized crime syndicates known as the yakuza.

Yamaguchi began reading newspapers starting in his early childhood. Angered by what he read, he became interested in nationalist movements and vehemently critical of politicians. Due to his father's job changes and transfers, Yamaguchi had to move frequently during his childhood, transferring between two elementary schools, three middle schools, and two high schools. As a result, he grew up with few close friends. He lived in Sapporo, Hokkaido for much of his childhood because of his father's work. In 1958, he was accepted into Tamagawa High School in Tokyo, however his father transferred him to Sapporo Kōsei, a local Catholic school in Sapporo. Yamaguchi then decided to move to Tokyo to live with his brother, and transferred back to Tamagawa High School.

Yamaguchi exhibited intense xenophobia from childhood, harboring deep revulsion toward foreigners, particularly Koreans and Chinese whom he perceived as "domineering" over Japan, fueling his early nationalist resentments.

He also developed profound hatred for left-wing groups, including communists, socialists, and labor unions (such as Nikkyoso), associating them with post-war incidents like the Mitaka, Shimoyama, Shiratori, and Matsukawa cases, which he viewed as existential threats to Japan's national integrity.

Described as contrarian and rebellious from a young age, often arguing the opposite of others (for example: insisting "left" if someone said "right"), Yamaguchi frequently clashed with teachers over ideological differences and felt alienated in school environments, contributing to frequent school transfers and general isolation. He was portrayed as a lonely youth who ignored parental and school advice, ultimately dropping out of high school to dedicate himself fully to extremist activities. Through the influence of his brother, he began attending speeches and participating in protests and counter-protests organized by various right-wing groups.

On 10 May 1959, at age 16, he heard a speech by right-wing ultranationalist Bin Akao declaring that Japan was on the verge of a revolution, and that the youth must begin resisting the actions of left-wing groups. This speech had a profound impact on him. After the speech, while Akao was planning to go to the next location, Yamaguchi told Akao that he wanted to go along with him, but Akao gently declined. Following this, he formally joined Akao's Greater Japan Patriotic Party.

== 1960 Anpo protests ==
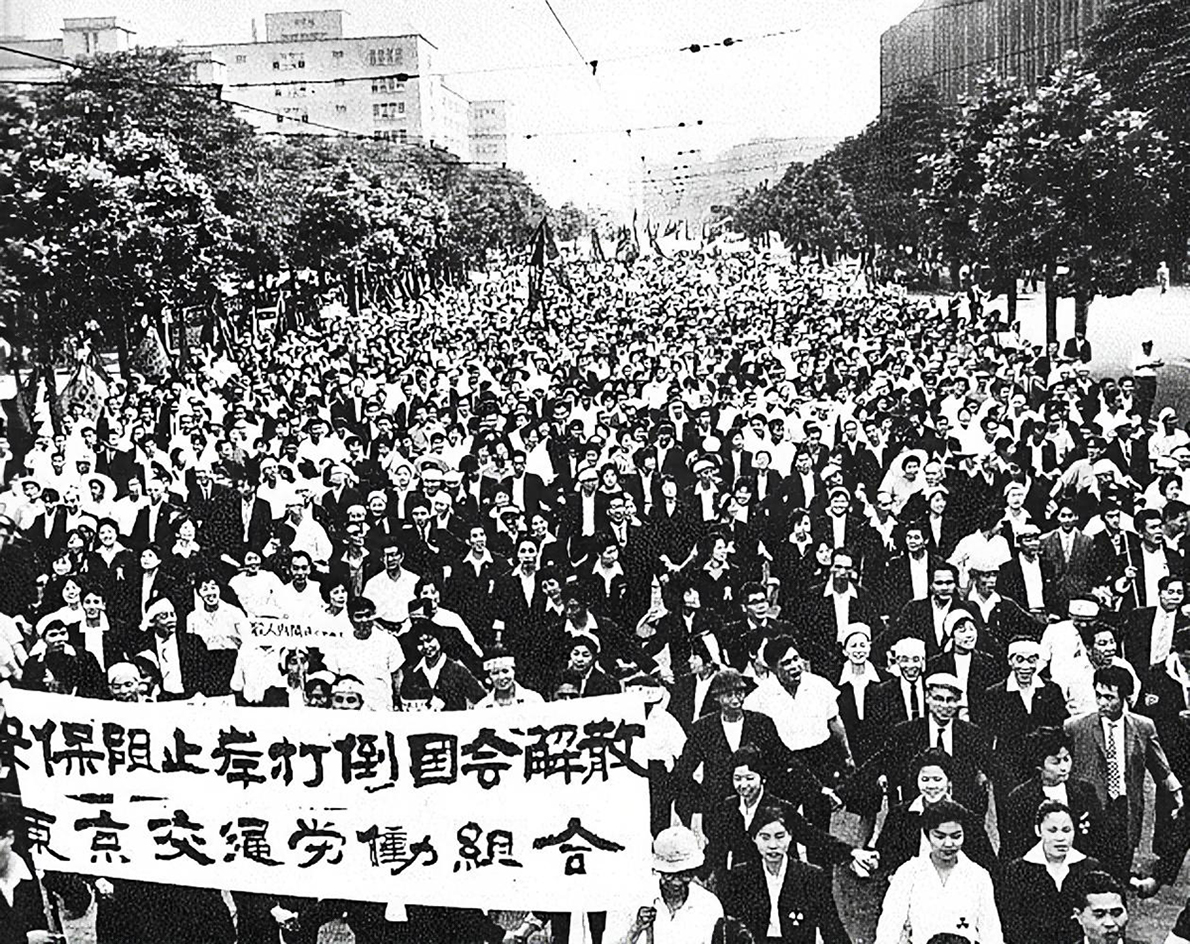
Protestors marching from Hibiya Park towards the national diet

Akao was virulently anti-communist and strongly pro-United States. Thus when left-wing protesters, led by Asanuma and the Japan Socialist Party, staged the massive Anpo protests against the 1960 revision of the U.S.-Japan Security Treaty (known as "Anpo" in Japanese), Akao became convinced that Japan was on the verge of a communist revolution and mobilized his followers to stage counter-protests. Yamaguchi participated in these counter-protest activities, and was arrested and released 10 times over the course of 1959 and 1960, within his first six months since joining Akao's party.

Yamaguchi's involvement with the Greater Japan Patriotic Party involved aggressive anti-communist actions, including disrupting left-wing events with propaganda, which led to repeated arrests (at least 10–17 documented incidents in 1959–1960) for offenses such as assault (throwing glue at opponents, striking individuals), obstruction of public duties, property damage, violence, and power abuse.

Examples include driving propaganda vehicles into venues (causing injuries), physical clashes with leftists and police during Anpo protests, and repeated violations despite parental and party leader warnings to curb aggression.

Due to this chronic pattern of violence, he was placed under four years of protective observation, indicating a disregard for legal consequences.

Contemporary reporting later listed fourteen items in Yamaguchi's "delinquency history"; the great majority were minor offences arising from street-propaganda activities (traffic violations and the like). A family-court judge who had handled Yamaguchi’s cases later remarked on the psychological "fault-line" or leap between leaflet distribution and murder.

Over the course of his participation in the Anpo protests, Yamaguchi became further disillusioned with Akao's leadership, which he felt was not radical enough. In his testimony to the police after the assassination of Asanuma, Yamaguchi stated that Akao was always talking about taking out left-wing leaders, but was only interested in protests and media coverage, and that Akao would stop him if he ever tried to act on his words. Later in the interview, he stated that he had resigned from Akao's party in order to "lay [his] hands on a weapon" and be free to take more "decisive action".

Akao, who had known Asanuma since their time on Miyake-jima, described him as "a good person, which makes it regrettable to deal with him" (善人だから始末に悪い). According to Sawaki Kōtarō's Teroru no Kessan, the two men were acquaintances who would exchange greetings when they passed each other on the street. Some sources suggest that Akao's personal view of Asanuma, together with Asanuma's statement labeling American imperialism as the common enemy of Japan and China (as recorded in Yamaguchi's Memorial of Severing the Traitor), influenced Yamaguchi's motives. Despite this recognition of Asanuma's personal character, Akao later celebrated Yamaguchi's act.

Akao himself later characterised Yamaguchi as "a specimen of seriousness" (真面目の標本): passionate and abrupt, yet well-liked by those around him and affectionately called "boya" (坊や).

Alongside Akao's influence, Yamaguchi was also inspired by the doctrine of the religious movement Seichō no Ie, particularly through founder Masaharu Taniguchi's writings such as Tennō Zettai-ron to Sono Eikyō (Absolute Theory of the Emperor and Its Influence), which Yamaguchi credited in his interrogation records with helping him overcome personal hesitation and embrace selfless loyalty to commit the act, Asanuma himself supported the founder of this movement, Masaharu Taniguchi. Taniguchi affirmed that Seichō no Ie was neither opposed to the Socialist Party nor aligned with the Liberal Democratic Party.

On 17 June 1960, when a right-wing youth attacked Jōtarō Kawakami, a Christian socialist and an adviser to the Japan Socialist Party, he commented:

I admired him, believing that sacrificing himself to stab the traitor Kawakami was an act carried out from a genuinely pure desire for the good of the nation. When my own time comes, I must carry it out thoroughly—by killing the target. (Note: 自分を犠牲にして売国奴河上を刺したことは、本当に国を思っての純粋な気持ちでやったのだと思い、敬服した。私がやる時には殺害するという徹底した方法でやらなくてはならぬ。)

— Otoya Yamaguchi, in his confession to the police

On 1 July, together with his comrades, he took part in the establishment of the Tokyo Branch of the All-Asia Anti-Communist League.

On 4 October, while searching for an accordion at his home, he accidentally came across a wakizashi (a traditional Japanese short sword). It had no handguard (tsuba) and was kept in a plain white wooden scabbard. Upon finding it, he said: "I decided that I would use this wakizashi to kill."

After paying his respects at Meiji Jingū, he immediately telephoned Takeshi Kobayashi, chairman of the Japan Teachers' Union (Nikkyōso), and Sanzō Nosaka, chairman of the Japanese Communist Party. He planned to request meetings by telling them, "I'm a university student committee member, and there's something I'd like you to teach me." However, Kobayashi had moved to a new residence, and Nosaka was away on a trip, so he was unable to put his plan into action against either of them, and the attempt failed.

== Assassination of Inejirō Asanuma ==
A photograph taken by Yasushi Nagao of Otoya Yamaguchi attempting to stab Inejirō Asanuma for a second time.

You, Inejirō Asanuma, are planning to turn Japan red [i.e. communist]. Although I bear no grudge against you as an individual, for the stances you have taken in your role as leader of the Socialist Party, for the outrageous statement you made when you visited China, and for the responsibility you bear for the intrusion into the National Diet, (Note: This is a reference to the "June 15th Incident" of 15 June 1960, when leftist protesters stormed the National Diet compound to protest the Security Treaty) I cannot grant you forgiveness. I shall hereby become the instrument that brings down heaven's judgment upon you. Day 12 of the 10th month of the 2,620th year of imperial rule (Note: 「汝、浅沼稲次郎は日本赤化をはかっている。自分は、汝個人に恨みはないが、社会党の指導的立場にいる者としての責任と、訪中に際しての暴言と、国会乱入の直接のせん動者としての責任からして、汝を許しておくことはできない。ここに於て我、汝に対し天誅を下す。 皇紀二千六百二十年十月十二日 山口二矢。」) (Note: 12 October 1960 in the Gregorian calendar.) Otoya Yamaguchi

— A note written in the book in Otoya Yamaguchi's Pocket

On 12 October 1960, Yamaguchi was in the large crowd of 2,500 spectators at a televised election debate held in Hibiya Public Hall in Hibiya Park in central Tokyo, featuring Suehiro Nishio of the Democratic Socialist Party, Inejirō Asanuma of the Japan Socialist Party, and Hayato Ikeda of the Liberal Democratic Party. Asanuma was the second to speak, and took the stage at 3:00 p.m.

At 3:05 p.m., Yamaguchi rushed onto the stage and made a deep thrust into Asanuma's left flank with the 33-centimeter replica "wakizashi" he had stolen from his father. (Note: The sword was a slightly undersized replica of a famous sword forged in the Kamakura Period by the swordsmith Rai Kunitoshi, and thus is better considered a wakizashi than a full-sized tachi or katana.) He was then swarmed and detained by bystanders. Bin Akao, who was present at the debate, reportedly remarked to someone nearby upon noticing the limited bleeding, "Little boy, did you miss your chance?" (坊や、やりそこなったかな). Asanuma was then rushed to a nearby hospital, but died within minutes from massive internal bleeding.

According to later recollections published in Sunday Mainichi, the Mainichi photographer Yasushi Nagao had already used eleven of the twelve frames on his roll and deliberately kept the final frame in reserve; that last exposure became the celebrated image. A Mainichi reporter who was with him recalled that they had taken front-row seats because they were uninterested in the Japan Series baseball game then in progress, and therefore witnessed the attack at close range. Contemporary accounts also note that Asanuma had declined offers of bodyguards, saying he was a socialist and that the masses trusted him.

At the time of his arrest at the scene of the murder, Yamaguchi had a notebook in his pocket describing Asanuma's actions as unforgivable, as well as detailing his motivations for the attack.

In this note, he made mention of political controversy surrounding Asanuma's support for the then recently proclaimed People's Republic of China, the 15 June Incident during the Anpo Protests, as well as concerns over Japan potentially becoming communist.

In the days following the assassination, an imperial envoy visited Asanuma's home in Shirakawa Town, Kōtō Ward, to deliver a sacrificial offering (saishiryō) from Emperor Hirohito, Hirohito publicly appealed for public order and obedience to the law. In a speech opening a special session of the National Diet on 18 October 1960, the emperor urged the Japanese people to "esteem the principle of obeying the laws" and to "shun violence", remarks widely understood as alluding to the killing of Asanuma and the unrest that followed. Contemporary observers described the address as the emperor's closest approach to intervening in a matter of grave national political concern since his renunciation of divinity in 1946.

The loss of Asanuma's adroit leadership and the new leadership that followed caused the party to head in a more centrist direction, and deprived the JSP of its ability to present a cohesive message, leading to severe infighting within the party. As a result, the number of seats the socialists held in the Diet continued to decline until the party's extinction in 1996.

=== Yamaguchi's perception of Asanuma ===
In his note left at the scene, Yamaguchi accused Asanuma of trying to "turn Japan red." In his subsequent police confession, he elaborated that Asanuma was a political opportunist who had repeatedly switched sides: a pre-war leftist who turned right-wing when suppressed, then "shamelessly switched to the left" after the war. Yamaguchi claimed Asanuma had belonged to the right wing of the Socialist Party until his 1959 visit to Communist China (after which he became increasingly left-leaning), which "exposed his "true communist nature" with the statement that "American imperialism is the common enemy of the peoples of China and Japan," and that he acted as the de facto leader of left-wing struggles including the Anpo protests.

Its leader, Chairman Asanuma Inejirō, was a leftist before the war, but when suppressed he formed a right-wing organization. After the war, when the leftist trend arose, he shamelessly switched to the left again and jumped on the bandwagon as an opportunist. Until the spring of last year he had been on the right wing, but after visiting Communist China he made outrageous statements such as ‘The United States is the common enemy of Japan and China,’ thereby exposing his true communist nature… From the standpoint of that responsibility as well, he is a man who cannot be allowed to live. If Asanuma is left as he is, with his personal popularity, his power will only grow further, and there is no doubt that he will risk his own body to lead Japan toward violent revolution. (Note: その指導者である浅沼稲次郎委員長は戦前左翼であったが弾圧されると右翼的な組織を作り、戦後左翼的風潮になるとはずかしくもなく又左翼に走り便乗した日和見主義者で、昨年春以前は右派であったが、中共を訪問して「米国は日中共同の敵である」など、暴言をなし、その共産党的な実体を暴露し、その頃から益々左傾し一昨年暮には警職法闘争で自ら大衆をせん動し、国会乱入を計り、党委員長就任後は左翼の実質的最高指導者として安保闘争など一連の闘争を指導するなど、その責任からも生かして置く訳けにいかない男で、浅沼をそのままにしておけぱ個人的人気もある処から益々勢力を伸し、彼が身を挺して日本を暴力革命に持って行こうとすることは疑いない。)

— Otoya Yamaguchi, in his confession to the police

However, Asanuma was a democratic socialist who had long led the right-leaning faction of the Japan Socialist Party. While the JSP sometimes cooperated tactically with the Japanese Communist Party, Asanuma was ideologically distinct from communism. In a speech criticizing the government, he warned that reactionary policies were dangerous precisely because they created chaos that could lead to communism, stating:

The Yoshida Cabinet has completely failed to respond to the passionate feelings of the people. Instead, it blindly follows America in foreign policy, while in domestic policy it races full speed ahead on a reactionary and reverse course. This has given rise to fascist reactionary politics that drive progressive citizens to despair. At the same time, it has created openings for the Communist Party to run rampant, opened the path to both left-wing and right-wing totalitarianism, and placed our homeland and democracy in grave crisis.

Asanuma was known for his pragmatic style, strong working-class appeal in downtown Tokyo, and deep personal reverence for the Emperor, including daily kamidana rituals and remote worship toward the Imperial Palace, traits that stood in contrast with orthodox Marxist-Leninist communism.

In his police interrogation records, Yamaguchi reiterated that he held no intent to criticize the late Asanuma personally. He expressed that he would pray for his soul and offered an apology to Asanuma's family for the sadness and trouble caused by the assassination.

However, as Chairman Asanuma is now no longer with us and has become a deceased person, I have not the slightest intention of pursuing or criticizing the wrongs he committed during his lifetime. I simply pray for the repose of his soul. Furthermore, regarding Chairman Asanuma’s family: although their economic life may be stable, no matter what kind of father or husband he was, familial love remains unchanged. It is a fact that they are now living with sadness due to his murder and that I have caused them trouble. Therefore, I sincerely apologize to his family from the bottom of my heart. (Note: しかし現在浅沼委員長は最早や故人となった人ですから、生前の罪悪を追求する考えは毛頭なく唯故人の冥福を祈る気持ちであります。又浅沼委員長の家族に対しては経済的生活は安定されているであろうが、如何なる父、夫であっても情愛には変りなく、殺害されたことによって悲しい想いで生活をし、迷惑をかけたことは事実でありますので、心から家族の方に申訳けないと思っています。)

— Otoya Yamaguchi

=== Broader targets and views on the imperial family ===
In his November 1960 police confession, Yamaguchi compiled a list of primary targets for assassination to curb what he saw as Japan's slide toward communism, including figures like Iwao Kobayashi (Nikkyoso chairman), Sanzo Nosaka (Japanese Communist Party leader), Inejirō Asanuma (his victim), Ichiro Kono, Tanzan Ishibashi, and Koichiro Matsumoto. He extended criticism to Prince Mikasa, brother of Emperor Hirohito, including him on a broader target list. Yamaguchi accused the prince of opposing Kigen-setsu (Japan's National Foundation Day), making statements that denied the imperial family's role, and allowing himself to be "used by the left wing". He expressed a desire to seek the prince's "reflection by some means", interpreted in context as implying potential confrontation or violence, due to Mikasa's liberal and pacifist views, including criticisms of Japan's actions in the Greater East Asia War. No evidence indicates Yamaguchi acted on plans beyond Asanuma before his arrest and suicide.

== Imprisonment and suicide ==
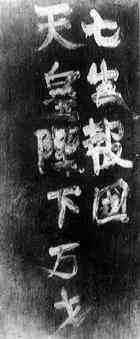
The note Otoya Yamaguchi wrote with toothpaste on his cell wall before committing suicide

Following the assassination, Yamaguchi was arrested and imprisoned awaiting trial. Throughout his incarceration, Yamaguchi remained calm and composed and freely gave extensive testimony to police. He spoke of goals pertaining to causing the restriction of behavior for future left-wing leaders, as well as a desire to negatively influence public perception of left-wing leaders and their ideology.

I did not think that the left-wing forces could be overthrown simply by taking out their leaders. However, the evil deeds those leaders had continued to perpetrate up to the present day could no longer be tolerated, and I knew that if even one leader were taken out, the behavior of future left-wing leaders would be constrained. If even a single member of the general public that is now blindly following the blandishments of left-wing agitators were awakened to their folly, I thought it would be worth doing... (Note: 「左翼指導者を倒せば左翼勢力をすぐ阻止できるとは考えないが、彼らが現在までやってきた罪悪は許すことはできないし、1人を倒すことによって、今後左翼指導者の行動が制限され、扇動者の甘言によって附和雷同している一般の国民が、1人でも多く覚醒してくれればそれで良いと思いました」)

— Otoya Yamaguchi, in his confession to the police

Yamaguchi spoke of Akao respectfully, referring to him using the honorific sensei (先生, master), however, also stating that Akao was more interested in "media attention" and "agitation", as opposed to actively putting his words and ideals to practice. Yamaguchi told police that Akao would have prevented him from carrying out the assassination had he known of his intentions, as well as consistently maintaining that he had acted alone and without any direction from others, stating the inaction on Akao's part as a component of his motivation and reasoning for resigning from the party and committing the offense.

Master Akao was always saying "we must take out the leaders of the left wing", but it was clear that he was more interested in attracting media attention with mild agitation, and that he would stop me if I ever tried to put his words into action....Therefore I decided to leave the party, lay my hands on a weapon, and take decisive action. (Note: 「赤尾先生も口では「左翼の指導者を倒さなければならない」などと言ってはいますが、実際は軽い事件を起こしてマスコミを利用した運動方法であり、私が実行したいと言えば阻止することは明らかであるので、... 脱党して武器を手に入れ決行しようと思いました。」)

In the same confession, Yamaguchi also listed the historical figures he most admired:

Regarding the figures I revere: The Emperor is absolute and thus separate, but they include Adolf Hitler, Kojima Takanori, Saigō Takamori, Yamaga Sokō, Yoshida Shōin, and others. Regarding Hitler, while I was in the Patriotic Party, I read his book Mein Kampf and was impressed by its guiding ideology of “national socialist thinking, anti-communist and anti-Jewish totalitarianism.” (Note: 八、崇拝している人物について申しあげます。天皇は絶対的なものですから別になりますが、アドルフ･ヒットラー、児島高徳、西郷隆盛、山鹿素行、吉田松陰などであります。ヒットラーについては愛国党にいた当時、著書マイン･カンプを読んでその指導理念「国家社会主義的な考え方、反共反ユダヤ的な全体主義」に感銘いたしました。)

Less than three weeks after the assassination, on 2 November, Yamaguchi mixed a small amount of toothpaste with water and wrote on his cell wall "Seven lives to serve the country (七生報国, shichishō hōkoku), long live the Emperor" (天皇陛下万才, tennōheika banzai), the former part a reference to the famous last words of fourteenth-century samurai Kusunoki Masashige. Yamaguchi then knotted strips of his bedsheet into a makeshift rope and used it to hang himself from a light fixture. He was found hanging at 8:31 p.m. and was apparently still alive at the time, but was pronounced dead three hours later after unsuccessful attempts to revive him by artificial respiration.

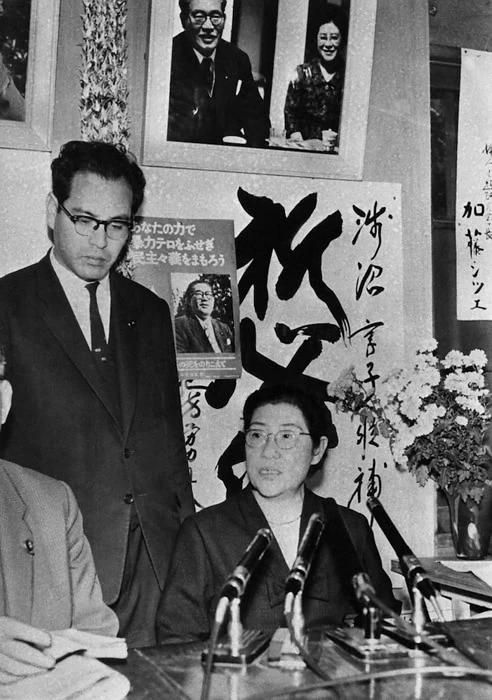
Kyōko Asanuma at a press conference on 3 November 1960, responding to Otoya Yamaguchi's suicide

On 3 November, the day after Yamaguchi's suicide, Kyōko Asanuma, widow of Inejirō Asanuma, held a press conference to address the news. She stated that she had learned of Yamaguchi's death from the morning newspapers and expressed pity for the young man rather than hatred, while directing strong condemnation toward the influences that had radicalized him:

I first learned of Yamaguchi’s suicide this morning through the newspaper. Rather than feeling hatred toward the boy, I feel more pity for him. My anger is burning up from the bottom of my heart once again toward the unseen forces that instilled such dangerous ideas into a 17-year-old boy and drove him to commit assassination.

Her response was widely regarded as an embodiment of the principle of "hating the sin but not the sinner".

Right-wing groups celebrated Yamaguchi as a martyr; they gave a burial coat, kimono, and belt to his parents and performed a memorial service for him. His ashes were interred in Aoyama Cemetery.

Yamaguchi's mother continued to visit Asanuma's grave on the anniversary of the latter's death.

== Legacy ==
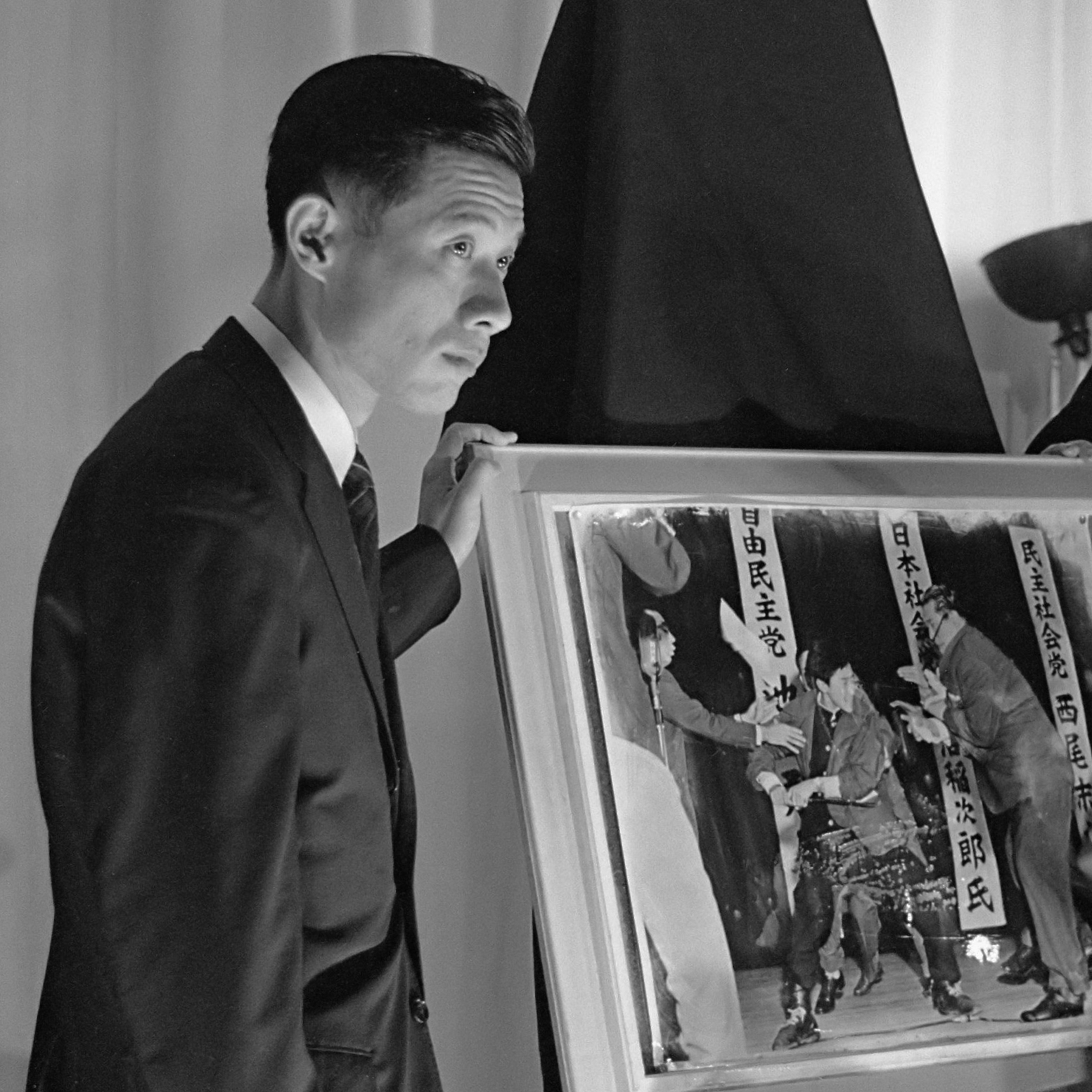
Yasushi Nagao with his Pulitzer Prize winning photo. (1961)

A photograph taken by Yasushi Nagao immediately after Yamaguchi withdrew his sword from Asanuma won the 1961 Pulitzer Prize, and the 1960 World Press Photo award. Footage of the incident was also captured.

On 15 December 1960, just weeks after Yamaguchi's suicide, a nationwide coalition of Japanese right-wing groups held a "National Memorial Service for Our Martyred Brother Yamaguchi Otoya" in the same Hibya Public Hall in Tokyo where Yamaguchi had assassinated Asanuma. Since then, right-wing groups have held an annual commemoration of Yamaguchi's death anniversary each year on 2 November. In October 2010, right-wing groups staged a large-scale celebration of the 50th anniversary of Yamaguchi's assassination of Asanuma in Hibiya Park.

Yamaguchi's actions and the massive publicity they received inspired a rash of copycat crimes, as a number of political figures became targets of assassination plots and attempts over the next few years. Of the notable crimes inspired by Yamaguchi's attack, one was the Shimanaka Incident of 1 February 1961. In this incident, Kazutaka Komori, a 17-year-old member of the Greater Japan Patriotic Party, attempted to assassinate the president of Chūō Kōron magazine for publishing a graphic dream sequence depicting the beheading of the emperor and his family. This played a role in establishing what came to be known as the Chrysanthemum taboo.

Japanese author Kenzaburō Ōe based his 1961 novellas Seventeen and Death of a Political Youth on Yamaguchi.

Yamaguchi's assassination and suicide have been critiqued in Japanese sources as heinous terrorism that contributed to perceptions of increasing "brutalization" in post-war juvenile delinquency. His extremism made "patriotism" appear frightening to the public, associating right-wing ideology with violence and evoking fears similar to those of organized crime.

The case inspired ongoing controversy and threats, such as those against author Kenzaburō Ōe for fictional works inspired by the event, perpetuating cycles of intimidation and societal division.

== Notes ==
=== Original Japanese text ===
Below is the original, untranslated transcriptions from various statements made by the subject of this article.
