= Central review =

Central review may refer to:

- Central Review, the Chinese journal Chūōkōron
- Central review (medicine) of pathology specimens
