= Saisho Atsushi =

Japanese samurai and statesman

Saisho Atsushi Senior Second Rank
- 税所 篤
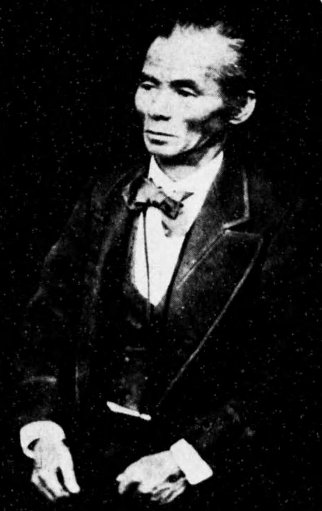

Governor of Kawachi Province
- In office 22 January 1869 – 17 July 1869

Governor of Hyōgo Prefecture
- In office 17 July 1869 – 19 August 1870

2nd Governor of Sakai Prefecture
- In office 19 August 1870 – 7 February 1881

Senator
- In office 12 July 1881 – 9 November 1887

First Governor of Nara Prefecture
- In office 9 November 1887 – 12 December 1889

Senator (Reappointment)
- In office 26 December 1889 – 5 June 1890

Imperial Court Councillor
- In office 5 June 1890 – 30 May 1900

Member of the Privy Council
- In office 28 April 1905 – 21 June 1910

Personal details
- Born: 12 December 1827 Kagoshima, Satsuma, Japan
- Died: June 21, 1910 (aged 82)
- Spouse: Yatoko Shiihara
- Occupation: Samurai; Politician
- Awards: Junior Third Rank; Senior Third Rank; Senior Second Rank; Title of Viscount; First Class Order of the Sacred Treasure; Second Class Order of the Rising Sun; First Class Grand Cordon of the Order of the Rising Sun

Japanese name
- Hiragana: さいしょ あつし
- Katakana: サイショ アツシ
- Kyūjitai: 稅所 篤
- Shinjitai: 税所 篤
Transcriptions
- Romanization: Saisho Atsushi

Saisho Atsushi (税所 篤) (22 December 1827 – 21 June 1910) was a Japanese samurai, viscount, governor, senator and member of the Privy Council of Japan. He was the adoptive father of Japanese writer Murakami Namiroku and thus the great-grandfather of the assassin Otoya Yamaguchi. Atsushi was renowned for his stubbornness and was considered one of the Satsuma Clan's Three Greats, along with Saigō Takamori and Ōkubo Toshimichi. He was a leader within the clan.

== Early life ==
He was born as the second son of Saisho Atsunori of the Satsuma clan. He had a poor quality of life as a small child, but when his older brother was favored by Hisamitsu Shimazu as the head priest of Kissho-in Temple, his life dramatically improved.

The Daimyo of the Satsuma Domain, then feudal lord Shimazu Nariakira saw potential in him and assigned to him roles of considerable importance and trust early on. He was made the official warehouse secretary and the district treasurer of Mishima. When the shogunate invited Dutch naval officers to establish the Nagasaki Naval Training Center, Nariakira selected just over ten samurai from Satsuma. Among them, Atsushi was one of the few who were selected. He later met Saigō Takamori, the man known as The Last Samurai, and the two developed a close friendship through their military experiences.

== Military service ==
Atsushi went on various military expeditions alongside Saigō Takamori. During the events prior to the First Chōshū expedition, Atsushi, along with Takamori and Takamori's younger brother Kōhei assisted in the defense of the Imperial Palace. Rounds of cannon fire were exchanged between the forces. The three were nearly overrun, however, reinforcements were brought in and Chōshū's forces were forced to retreat. Atsushi, and the other two would sustain non-life-threatening injuries from the battle.

Atsushi, alongside Saigō went on a diplomatic excursion to rebel-held Shimonoseki in an attempt to win the trust of loyalists, and to negotiate the release of five nobles. The move carried great risk but they considered the move necessary to winning the trust of loyalists in the area. They met were able to begin diplomatic talks. The negotiations ended without violence. The five nobles were transferred to the Fukuoka domain in Kyushu, a territory considered to be neutral. The caravan were guarded by soldiers from five domains. The five were successfully transported without any issues or interruptions. Peace was then successfully negotiated, and the expedition against Chōshū disbanded without further incident.

== Public service ==
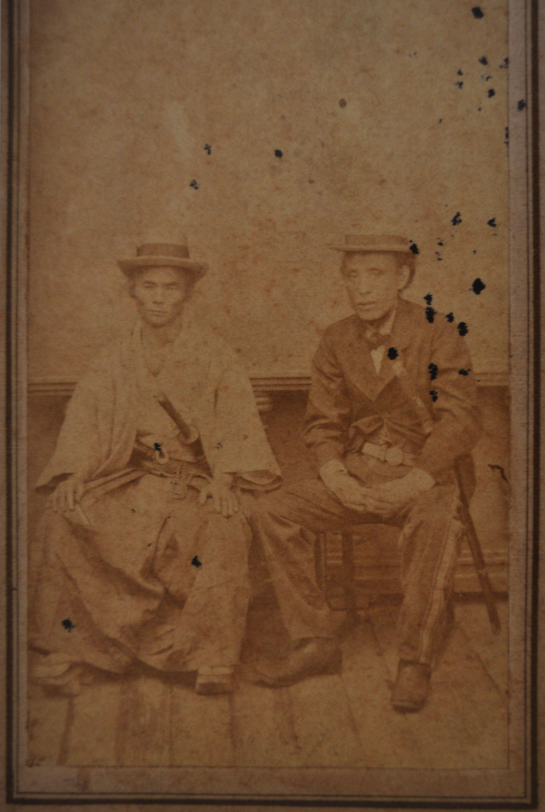
On the right is Toshimichi Okubo, on the left is Atsushi when he was governor of Sakai prefecture. Dated 6 May 1872

In the new Meiji government, he served as a judge regarding domestic affairs, and on the recommendation of his friend Okubo, served as the governor and a magistrate in the prefectures of Kawachi, Hyōgo, Sakai and Nara, where like in much of western Japan at the time, there was still political instability. While the governor of Sakai, he allocated significant funds into the development of education around the prefecture. Atsushi oversaw the opening of a teachers training school, a medical school, a hospital, a girls' school and the publishing of Sakai-edition schoolbooks. He also directed substantial resources into industry and commerce, such as renovating a lighthouse, constructing a textile factory, and erecting a brick factory. In addition, he also undertook administrative duties, including overseeing the establishment and expansion of several public parks, such as Hamadera Park, Ohama Park and Nara Park.

== Establishment of Nara Prefecture ==
When the feudal system ended and the prefectural system began, many territories were merged with adjacent territories, for the purpose of simplifying governance. On 18 April 1876, Nara Prefecture was merged into Sakai Prefecture, then on 7 February 1881, Sakai Prefecture was incorporated into Osaka prefecture. Citizens within Nara had started a secession movement, seeking to break away from Osaka prefecture and establish Nara prefecture. Then Senator Atsushi had sympathies towards the movement, and showed favor towards it, and had previously stated his objections towards the incorporation of Nara Prefecture into Osaka prefecture. He provided advice to the heads of the movement and conveyed their aspirations to influential government officials, and became deeply involved in the movement. On 1 December 1887, Nara District had formally seceded from Osaka Prefecture, thus becoming the new and separate administrative division of Nara Prefecture.

== Flooding of Totsukawa and relief ==
In 1889, while Atsushi was the prefectural governor of Nara, catastrophic flooding from heavy rainfall caused severe damage in Totsukawa village. The disaster left 168 dead, wiped out 70% of their farmland, and destroyed 610 houses. The lands were previously infertile, the geography changed as a result of the flooding, and the disaster wiping out their crops and their farmland made it impossible for the entire village to restart their lives while remaining there. As a result, much of the village began the process of relocating to Hokkaido. Atsushi oversaw their migration, and posted an official notice offering his respects and condolences while wishing them well on their future endeavors, as well as informing them of monetary disaster relief aid granted by Meiji to help them reestablish their lives. They founded a new settlement in Hokkaido, and in commemoration of their old village of Totsukawa, opted to name it "Shintotsukawa" (lit. 'New Totsukawa').

Every year on 20 June in Shintotsukawa, Hokkaido, a ceremony is held to commemorate the establishment of the town. They have a tradition of reading the official notice given by Atsushi at the ceremony.

The full text of the notice can be read below:

Original Japanese Text	English Translation
吉野郡十津川郷北海道移住者 今年8月の未曽有の豪雨で発生した災害で一夜にして家、畑等の財産を失い、先祖代々守ってきた墓があるこの地を去って、新たな生活を切り拓くために北海道へ移住することとなり、その心中は察するところがあります。 今回の災害は、何とも痛ましく堪えられない状況であったでしょう。また、被害状況を確認して将来のことを考えても 川と山とが入れ替わったような被害の遭ったこの土地のあり様では、農地も狭く、今後、ここで生活を再起することは、非常に難しく、たとえ幾十年も苦労して復興を行っても到底充分な発達を見込めることは、今の段階で期待する事ができません。 しかしながら、北海道は土地が広く、住民は多くはないが、農産が見込め、水産資源が豊富であり、加えて、今後鉄道敷設が進む地域です。このように今後、発達が見込める土地柄であるので瘠土を後にし、新天地北海道の沃野を耕すことは本当に最善の良策であり、他にこれ以上の案はないと思っています。 さらに剛毅であり忍耐に長けるあなた達ですからその辛さに堪えて幾多の苦難に耐え乗り越えることができるでしょう。そして、今の苦しみから脱して幸福を得ることができるのは疑いのないところです。 そもそもあなた達は、昔より勤王で名高い十津川郷士であります。また、北海道は我が国の北方警備の重要な要所であります。今、その地へ移住をするあなた達が一団となって開拓を行うことは、自分たちの生活の為だけでなく大いに国家の為になることであります。実にこの志、行動は大変すばらしいことであります。 そのようなことから今回、天皇陛下の特旨により就産資金として金二千円もの恩賜をいただけたのであります。天皇陛下の手厚い保護をいただけることに、感謝申し上げる次第であります。 移住後は、今回の移住の経緯を長く忘れることなく、仕事を熱心に勤め、仕事に精を出して励み あなた方が十津川郷士の名声を下げることなく、また、国家を守る武士のごとく尽くしていただき、政府の期待に応えていただくことを願っております。 あなたたちの今後に、困難があることや努力が必要なことは十分理解しておりますが、移住出発の別れであるが故に特にこれを申し上げます。 明治二十二年十月 奈良県知事 従三位勲二等子爵 税所 篤	To the residents who are moving from Yoshino District, Totsukawa Region, to Hokkaido: This year's August has seen record-breaking torrential rain of disastrous proportions. In one night, your houses, fields and other possessions were lost. You all made the decision to leave this land where your ancestor's graves lie, thus beginning a new life in Hokkaido. I can truly empathize. This disaster really was a series of truly painfully unbearable events to happen upon us. Moreso, after confirming the extent of the damage and considering the future, the damage this land received has made it look like the mountains and rivers swapped places. The farmland is also infertile, so surviving here will be extremely difficult. Even should you struggle for decades, it is impossible for me to foresee a promising outcome. However, Hokkaido has vast land and not a lot of people. It has great potential for your agriculture and fishing to produce abundant yields. In the future, you should expect the ongoing railroad construction to reach Hokkaido as well. Considering all this, leaving behind this place's infertile land here for the new land of Hokkaido's fertile land is truly your best option, and I can think of no alternatives. Moreso, you're all resilient and possess great strength and patience, you can endure and move past numerous hardships, in spite of the pain they bring. You will break free from this suffering and find happiness, without a doubt. You were back then, and still are now, the loyal people of Totsukawa, remembered for your loyalty to the Emperor. Moreso, Hokkaido is an important strategic location for defending our northern regions. Now, as you move to that land and go on your adventures north, it won't just benefit your lives but also greatly contribute to this nation. Truly, a wonderful act. Due to the current situation, we have received a generous gift of 2000 yen (Note: ¥2,000 (1889) (equivalent to ¥8.69 million or US$57,421.56 in 2024)) in gold from his majesty, the emperor, for settlement funds. We have extended him our gratitude. After you have finished relocating, I can only hope that you will remember the circumstances surrounding this relocation for a long time to come. I hope you work dilligitently and happily without harming the reputation of the Totsukawa people. My wish is that you protect our nation like the samurai and meet the expectations of our government. I understand that there will be continued hardships in your future, but because this is goodbye, I particularly wanted to leave this message here. October 22, 1889; Nara Prefectural Governor; Junior Third Rank, Distinguished Second Class, Viscount; Saisho Atsushi

== Honors ==
Court Ranks

- 20 October 1886 — Junior Third Rank
- 30 June 1894 — Senior Third Rank
- 21 June 1910 — Senior Second Rank

Military awards

- 25 November 1887 — Second Class Order of the Rising Sun
- 25 November 1889 — Meiji Constitution Proclamation Commemorative Medal
- 26 December 1903 — First Class Order of the Sacred Treasure
- 1 April 1906 — First Class Grand Cordon of the Order of the Rising Sun
