= Kazutaka Komori =

Japanese assassin (1943)

Kazutaka Komori (小森 一孝, Komori Kazutaka; born May 25, 1943) is a Japanese right-wing ultranationalist youth who, in 1961 during an attempt to assassinate Japanese journalist and magazine publisher Hōji Shimanaka, murdered Shimanaka's housemaid and critically injured his wife.

== Early life ==
Komori was born in Nagasaki, Japan, on May 25, 1943. His mother, Tatsu, committed suicide when he was a young boy. His neighbors later described him as having been a "moody" child, and in high school he was once admitted to a mental hospital following a nervous breakdown. After graduating from high school, he drifted around the country taking on various odd jobs. On January 3, 1961, he joined prominent ultra-rightist Bin Akao's Greater Japan Patriotic Party, and withdrew from the party just hours before his attack on Shimanaka's household.

== Attack ==
On February 1, 1961, at the age of 17, Komori went to the home of prominent Tokyo publisher Hōji Shimanaka with the intent to kill him in retribution for a fictional story by Shichirō Fukazawa printed in Shimanaka's magazine Chūō Kōron that described the overthrow and murder of the Japanese Imperial family. The story, which satirized the recent Anpo protests, depicted a dream sequence in which the reigning emperor and empress were beheaded, along with the crown prince and princess. Shimanaka was not at home but Komori murdered his 51-year-old maid and critically injured the publisher's wife. Komori fled the scene and later turned himself in to police.

==== Legal proceedings, imprisonment and hospitalization ====
Komori was tried as an adult and sentenced to 15 years in prison. Kenji Ino wrote in “Critique: Akao Bin: Rebel Radical Human”, page 133 (All Publishing, 1991):

Kazutaka Komori lost his mental balance while serving time in Chiba Prison. Whenever a meal was served, he repeatedly drowned his head in miso soup while shouting, “Long live the Emperor!" and repeatedly poured miso soup over his head. He is still in a hospital in Nagasaki Prefecture.

=== Aftermath and cultural impact ===
This murder and the assassination of Inejiro Asanuma by Otoya Yamaguchi led to the arrest of Bin Akao in 1961.

Following the attack, Shichirō Fukazawa, the author of the published story, went into hiding for five years.

The attack and the media coverage that surrounded both the assassination attempt and the story itself significantly contributed to a self-censorship amongst Japanese writers in regards to the Imperial family. This became known as the Chrysanthemum taboo.
