= Sumiko Sakamoto =

Japanese actress and singer (1936–2021)

- 坂本スミ子
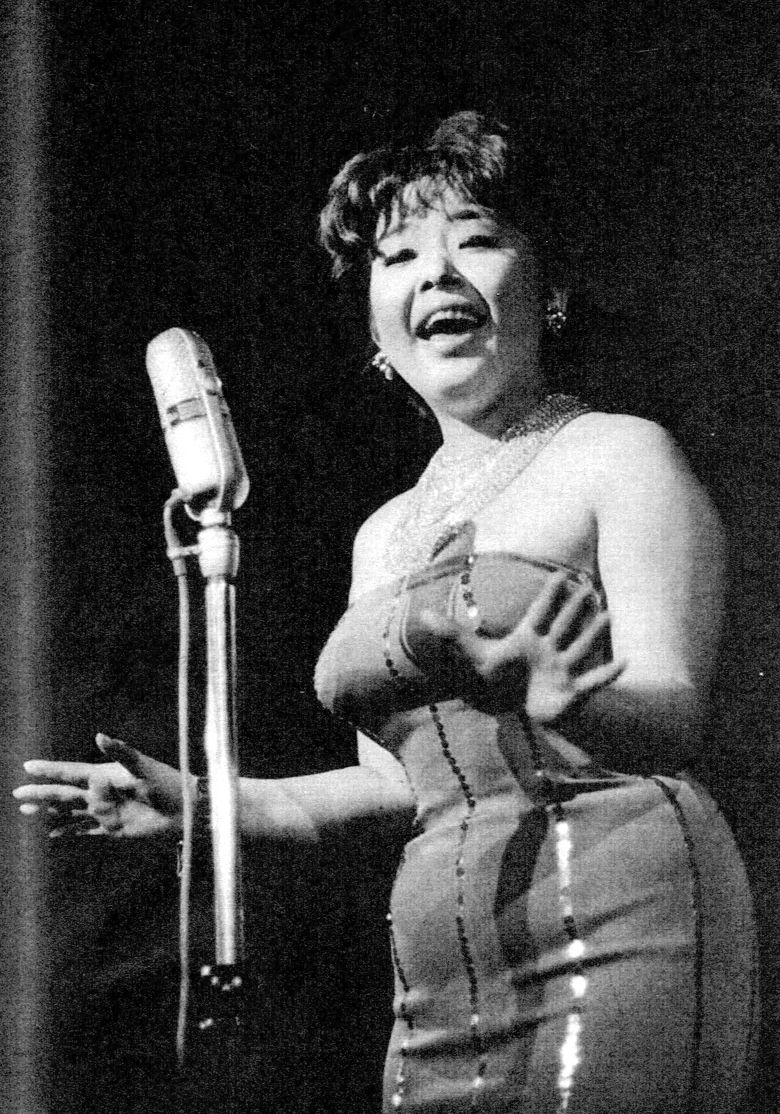
- Sakamoto in 1962
- Born: 25 November 1936; Osaka, Empire of Japan
- Died: 23 January 2021 (aged 84)
- Occupations: Singer; actor

Sumiko Sakamoto (坂本スミ子, Sakamoto Sumiko; 25 November 1936 – 23 January 2021) was a Japanese singer and award-winning actress, born in Osaka, whose heartfelt performances made her a favorite of the late film director Shohei Imamura. Imamura cast her in three of his films: The Pornographers, Warm Water Under a Red Bridge, and The Ballad of Narayama, winner of the Palme d'Or at the 1983 Cannes Film Festival. She won the award for Japanese Best Actress from Nihon Academy for her performance in The Ballad of Narayama, as well as a kiss from Orson Welles.

She died of a stroke.
