= Shichirō Fukazawa =

Japanese author and guitarist (1914–1987)

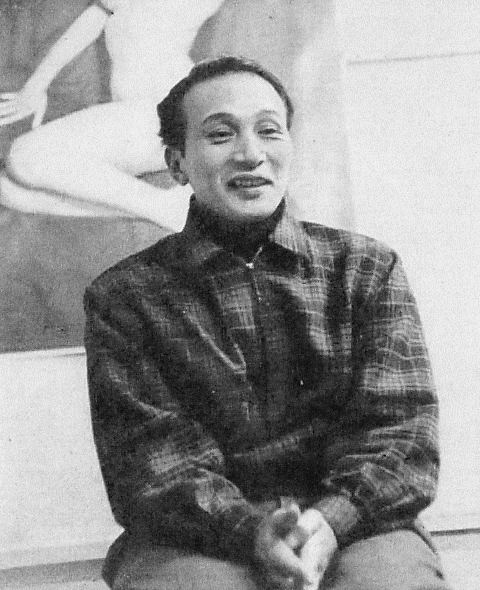
- Born: January 29, 1914; Isawa, Japan
- Died: August 18, 1987 (aged 73); Japan
- Occupation: Author
- Writing career
- Genre: Fiction

Shichirō Fukazawa (深沢 七郎, Fukazawa Shichirō; January 29, 1914 – August 18, 1987) was a Japanese author and guitarist whose 1960 short story Fūryū mutan ("Tale of an Elegant Dream") caused a nationwide uproar and prompted an assassination attempt of the president of the magazine that published it.

== Biography ==
Fukazawa was born in Isawa, Yamanashi, Japan. His first work, The Ballad of Narayama (楢山節考, Narayama bushikō), won the prestigious Chūō Kōron Prize, announcing his status as a rising star in the literary world, and has twice been adapted for film: first by Keisuke Kinoshita in 1958, and again by Shōhei Imamura in 1983. Imamura's film won the Cannes Film Festival Palme d'Or.

== Shimanaka Incident ==
In the fall of 1960, the mainstream monthly magazine Chūō Kōron published his satirical short story Furyū mutan (風流夢譚, “The Tale of an Elegant Dream"). In the story, an unnamed protagonist narrates a dream sequence in which leftists take over the Imperial Palace and behead the Emperor and Empress, as well as the Crown Prince and Crown Princess, before an enthusiastic crowd. This story provoked fury in the Imperial Household Agency and among Japanese right-wing ultranationalists.

On February 1, 1961, in response to the story, Kazutaka Komori, a seventeen-year-old rightist, broke into the home of Hōji Shimanaka, Chūō Kōron magazine's president, killed his maid and severely wounded his wife. Fukazawa received death threats on a daily basis, and after offering a tearful public apology, went into hiding for five years. His promising literary career went into a long hiatus, and although he later returned to writing, he never fully recovered his "rising star" status. In later years, he could be found serving grilled bean cakes (imagawayaki) in a working class Tokyo neighborhood at a stall called "Dream Shop" (Yumeya).

The aftermath of the Shimanaka incident (嶋中事件, Shimanaka jiken) meant that criticism of the Imperial Family, and discussion of the role or existence of the Emperor, became taboo.

== Selected prizes ==
- 1956 Chūō Kōron Prize for The Ballad of Narayama (Narayamabushi ko)
- 1981 Tanizaki Prize for Michinoku no ningyotachi (みちのくの人形たち)

== Selected works ==
- Narayama bushikō, 楢山節考, 1956.
- Tōhoku no Zunmu-tachi, 東北の神武たち, 1957.
- 笛吹川, 1958.
- 言わなければよかったのに日記, 1958.
- 東京のプリンスたち, 1959.
- 千秋楽, 1964.
- 甲州子守唄, 1964.
- 人間滅亡の唄, 1966.
- 庶民烈伝, 1970.
- 盆栽老人とその周辺, 1973.
- 無妙記, 1975.
- 妖木犬山椒, 1975.
- Michinoku no ningyōtachi (みちのくの人形たち), 1979.
- Chotto ippuku meido no michikusa (ちょっと 一服 冥土 の 道草), Tōkyō : Bungei Shunjū, 1983.
- 極楽まくらおとし図, 1984.

== Records ==
- Sobo no mukashigatari (Nippon Columbia 1973)
