= Nanami Shiono =

Japanese writer

Shiono Nanami
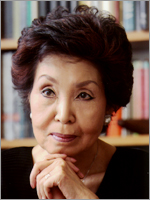
- Shiono in 2007
- Born: 7 July 1937 (age 89); Tokyo, Japan
- Occupations: Novelist, essayist
- Writing career
- Genre: Historical
- Notable work: Roma-jin no Monogatari (『ローマ人の物語』) series

Nanami Shiono (塩野 七生, Shiono Nanami; born 7 July 1937) is a Japanese author and novelist known for her works on the history of Italy, especially those dealing with ancient Rome and the Renaissance period.

== Biography ==
Shiono was born in Tokyo, on 7 July 1937. In high school she read Homer's Iliad and was fascinated by it. She graduated from Gakushuin University with a degree in philosophy. During her school years, she was deeply involved with student activism, but eventually became disillusioned with the movement. Shiono wanted to attend Waseda University, but she was denied by her father.

From 1963 to 1968, she lived in Italy, studying the language and history of the country on her own. During this time, she also travelled extensively in Europe, North Africa, and the Middle East. Upon returning to Japan in 1968, she began to write and published her first book, Runesansu no Onna-tachi (Women of the Renaissance), in the literary magazine Chūo Kōron.

In 1970, she published her second work Chēzare Borujia Aruiwa Yūganaru Reikoku (Cesare Borgia the Elegant Tyrant). In the same year, she married an Italian doctor of Sicilian descent and moved to Florence. They had a son, but later divorced. She moved to Rome in 1993 and currently lives there.

=== Works ===
Her early work from the 1970s contain many historical novels set in Renaissance Italy, such as those listed above and Kami no Dairinin (Deputies of God). Later her interests shifted to the history of Venice. In 1980, she published Umi no Miyako no Monogatari (Story of the City of the Sea), the work that made Shiono a nationally known figure.

In 1992 Shiono started a monumental work on ancient Rome, Roma-jin no Monogatari (Stories of the Romans). Completed in 2006, it is a 15-volume series that traces the history of the city and the Roman Empire.

She has also written many non-fiction works, mainly essays on historic, political and/or cultural topics.

=== Reputation and awards ===
Although her first works were well received in Japan, it was not until the publication of Umi no Miyako no Monogatari that she became a best-selling author. Umi no Miyako no Monogatari became a literary phenomenon in the 1980s, eliciting reviews that compared Venice to Japan and sought hints about the future of Japan in her book. Her books were first published in Korea in 1995, and Roma-jin no Monogatari quickly became a bestseller there (Roma-in Iyagi in Korean).

Shiono was awarded the Mainichi Publishing Culture Award from the Mainichi daily newspaper for Runesansu no Onna-tachi. In 1982, Umi no Miyako no Monogatari won the Suntory Literary Prize. She won the Kikuchi Kan Prize the following year. For Roma-jin no Monogatari, she was awarded the Shincho Literary Prize. She received the Shiba Ryotaro Prize in 1999, and in 2002 the Italian government conferred upon her the Grande Ufficiale Order of Merit for introducing Italian history and culture to Japan.

In Japan, opinions about Shiono's work are divided. Her works have been praised for their historical sweep, but have also been called oversimplified depictions of moments in history that were in fact multi-faceted and complicated. Professional historians tend to criticize her works for their lack of references and objectivity. Her interpretations of ancient Roman history have been challenged, and some critics object to what they see as right-leaning political tendencies.

== Shiono Nanami's Works ==
=== Works on the Renaissance ===
- Runesansu no Onna-tachi (Women of the Renaissance) (1968)
- Chēzare Borujia Aruiwa Yūganaru Reikoku (Cesare Borgia the Elegant Tyrant) (1970)
- Umi no Miyako no Monogatari (Story of the City of the Sea) (1980)
- Kami no Dairinin (Deputies of God) (1972)
- Waga Tomo Makiavetri (My Friend Machiavelli) (1987)

=== Res Gestae Populi Romani ===
- Roma-jin no Monogatari (Res Gestae Populi Romani: Stories of the Romans) (1992–2006)
  - Roma wa Ichinichi ni shite Narazu (Roma Non Uno Die Aedificata Est: Rome was not Built in A Day) (1992)
  - Hannibaru Senki (Bellum Hannibalicum: The Hannibal War) (1993)
  - Shōsha no Konmei (Bellorum Civilium: The Turmoil of the Victor) (1994)
  - Yuriusu Kaesaru, Rubikon Izen (C. Iulius Caesar Ante Rubiconem: Julius Caesar, Before Crossing the Rubicon) (1995)
  - Yuriusu Kaesaru, Rubikon Igo (C. Iulius Caesar Post Rubiconem:Julius Caesar, After Crossing the Rubicon) (1996)
  - Pakkusu Rōmana (Pax Romana) (1997)
  - Akumei Takaki Kōtei-tachi (Imperatores Malæ Famæ: The Infamous Emperors) (1998)
  - Kiki to Kokufuku (Crisis Et Ab Ea Exitus: Crisis and Vanquishment) (1999)
  - Kentei no Seiki (Sæculum Aureum: The Century of Good Emperors) (2000)
  - Subete no Michi wa Rōma ni Tsūzu (Omniæ Viæ Quæ Ad Romam Duxerunt: All Roads Lead to Rome) (2001)
  - Owari no Hajimari (Finis Principium: Start of the Catastrophe) (2002)
  - Meisō Suru Teikoku (Tertii Sæculi Crisis: The Empire in Chaos) (2003)
  - Saigo no Doryoku (De Ultimis Laboribus: The Last Endeavour) (2004)
  - Kirisuto no Shōri (De Christi Victoria: The Victory of Christ) (2005)
  - Rōma Sekai no Shūen (Romani Mundi Finis: The End of the Roman World) (2006)

=== Novels (fiction) ===
==== The East Mediterranean Trilogy ====
- Konstantinōpuru no Kanraku (The Fall of Constantinople) (1983)
  - The Fall of Constantinople translated into English by Kerim Yasar - Vertical Inc. 2005
- Rōdosu-to Kōbō-ki (The Record of the Battle of Rhodes) (1985)
  - The Siege of Rhodes translated into English by Carolyn L. Temporelli, Wilburn Hansen, & Steven Wills - Vertical Inc. 2006
- Repanto no Kaisen (The Battle of Lepanto) (1987)
  - The Battle of Lepanto translated into English by Carolyn L. Temporelli, Steven M. Bryan, & Wilburn Hansen - Vertical Inc. 2007

==== The Stories from Three Cities ====
- Hiiro no Venezia (Venice in Crimson) (1987)
- Giniro no Firenze (Florence in Silver) (1989)
- Oōgon no Roma (Rome in Gold) (1990)

=== Essays ===
- Silent Minority (1993)
- Otoko-tachi E (To Men) (1989)
- Futatabi Otoko-tachi E (To Men Again) (1994)
- Itaria Kara no Tegami (Letters from Italy) (1972)
- Itaria Ibun (Strange tales from Italy) (1979)
- Otona Futari no Gogo (Afternoon Conversation between Two Adults), co-authored with Hiroyuki Itsuki (1998)

== Awards and honors ==
- Mainichi Publishing Culture Award (1970)
- Suntory Literary Prize (1981)
- Kikuchi Kan Prize (1982)
- Shincho Literary Prize (1993)
- Shiba Ryotaro Award (1999)
- Grand Officer of the Order of Merit of the Italian Republic (2000)
- JSCE(Japan Society of Civil Engineers) Publication Prize (2001)
- Medal of Honor with Purple Ribbon(2005)
- Person of Cultural Merit (2007)
- Order of Culture (2023)
