= Hōji Shimanaka =

Japanese magazine publisher (1923-1997)

- Born: February 7, 1923; Japan
- Died: April 3, 1997 (aged 74)
- Education: Tokyo Imperial University
- Occupations: Journalist, magazine publisher
- Organization: Chūō Kōron magazine
- Known for: Intended assassination target in the Shimanaka Incident
- Spouse: Masako Shimanaka
- Father: Yūsaku Shimanaka

Hōji Shimanaka (嶋中 鵬二, Shimanaka Hōji; February 7, 1923 – April 3, 1997) was a Japanese magazine publisher who was the president and publisher of the prominent monthly magazine Chūō Kōron for nearly five decades. According to Shimanaka's longtime friend and sometime rival Kengo Tanaka, the publisher of competing Bungei Shunjū magazine, "Shimanaka was a virtual synonym for Chūō Kōron." Under Shimanaka's leadership, Chūō Kōron became one of the best known and most widely read magazines in Japan, but in his final years as president he sunk the magazine deep into debt, causing it to be taken over by a rival publishing company. Shimanaka is also known for an attempt by a right-wing youth to assassinate him in February 1960, in what became known as the "Shimanaka Incident".

Shimanaka was a close friend and the primary publisher of famed Japanese author Junichirō Tanizaki, and was a close friend to renowned American scholar of Japanese literature Donald Keene. Shimanaka's wife, Masako (1925–2004), was the daughter of the well-known political scientist Masamichi Rōyama.

== Early life ==
Hōji Shimanaka was born on February 7, 1923, the second son of journalist Yūsaku Shimanaka, who would later rise to become the owner and publisher of Chūō Kōron magazine. As a boy, Shimanaka attended Tokyo Higher Normal School Elementary School (present-day Tsukuba University Elementary School). Shimanaka's elementary school classmates included philosopher Shunsuke Tsurumi and sociologist Michio Nagai.

After graduating from high school, Shimanaka majored in German studies at prestigious Tokyo Imperial University. Shimanaka's education was interrupted by World War II, when he was drafted as mobilized labor and worked Nakajima Aircraft Corporation's research institute.

Returning to his university studies after the war, Shimanaka was heavily involved in the publication of the 14th edition of the famous Tokyo University literary magazine Shinshichō (新思潮, "New Trends in Thought").

After graduating from university, Shimanaka joined the staff of his father's magazine Chūō Kōron in 1948, but hoped to pursue an academic career. In January 1949, his father Yusaku died. His older brother, Shinya Shimanaka, briefly succeeded their father to the presidency of the Chūō Kōron company, but also died shortly thereafter of illness, so Shimanaka resigned his positions as a part-time lecturer at Meiji University and Tōyō University and became full-time president of Chūōkōron-sha at the age of 25.

Under Shimanaka's guidance, Chūō Kōron was one of the most important magazines of the 1950s and 1960s, publishing both popular and literary fiction by both established and up-and-coming authors as well as opinion-leading thought pieces by scholars and intellectuals. In 1956, Shimanaka oversaw the construction of a new headquarters building for the company in Kyōbashi, Chūō-ku, Tokyo.

Shimanaka was close friends with Japanese author Junichirō Tanizaki, and was Tanizaki's primary publisher. Shimanaka also formed a close friendship in the early 1950s with renowned American scholar of Japanese literature Donald Keene, when Keene was just starting out in his career. Both men were around the same age, and Keene credited Shimanaka with playing a crucial role by introducing Keene to many of the leading lights of the Japanese literary world. Shimanaka also offered Keene chances to publish articles in Chūō Kōron, and personally edited Keene's Japanese manuscripts.

== Shimanaka Incident ==
The November 1960 issue of Chūō Kōron featured a satirical story by up-and-coming author Shichirō Fukazawa featuring a dream sequence in which the Emperor and Empress were beheaded with a guillotine. Japanese right-wing ultranationalist groups were outraged and mounted a long series of protests and attacks aimed at Chūō Kōron in an attempt to force an apology. An initial attempt at apology was deemed too perfunctory by the rightists, and on the evening of February 1, 1961, a 17-year-old rightist named Kazutaka Komori invaded Shimanaka's home in Shinjuku, Tokyo in an apparent assassination attempt. Shimanaka was away from home at the time, but his housekeeper was stabbed to death and his wife Masako was seriously injured, in a terroristic attack that became known as the "Shimanaka Incident."

In response, Chūō Kōron's editorial board issued a defiant press release speaking of the magazine's duty to defend freedom of expression, but Shimanaka, deeply shaken by the attack on his household, issued a rebuttal called simply "Apology" (Owabi), in which he repudiated Fukazawa's story as “unsuitable for print," saying it was “published as a result of my own personal negligence.” He then offered his "deepest apologies" for “having disturbed society to the point of causing violent incidents." Thereafter, Shimanaka forced the magazine's editor-in-chief to resign, and negotiated a deal with right-wing groups to end the attacks on Chūō Kōron in exchange for a promise to adopt a more "neutral" (i.e. conservative) editorial policy.

== Later life and death ==
In 1994, Shimanaka resigned as president of Chūō Kōron after 45 years, succeeded by his eldest son Yukio, and became chairman of the board of directors. However two years later, in 1996, he fired Yukio and for a time the company had no president.

Shimanaka died of lung cancer on April 3, 1997, at the age of 74. After his death, it was discovered that he had mismanaged the company, leaving behind a massive debt of 15 billion yen. Shimanaka's wife Masako became chairman and president, but was not able to resolve the company's financial crisis. In 1998, Chūōkōron-sha and all of its assets were bought out by the Yomiuri Shimbun newspaper company.
