= Greater Japan Patriotic Party =

Far right party in Japan

Greater Japan Patriotic Party 大日本愛国党
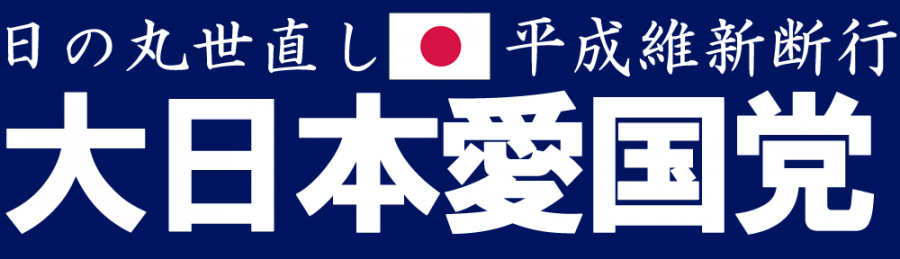
- Founder: Bin Akao
- Founded: 1951; 75 years ago
- Headquarters: Tokyo, Japan
- Ideology: Japanese ultranationalism; Radical anti-communism; Pro-Americanism
- Political position: Right-wing to far-right

Website
- http://aikokutou.net/

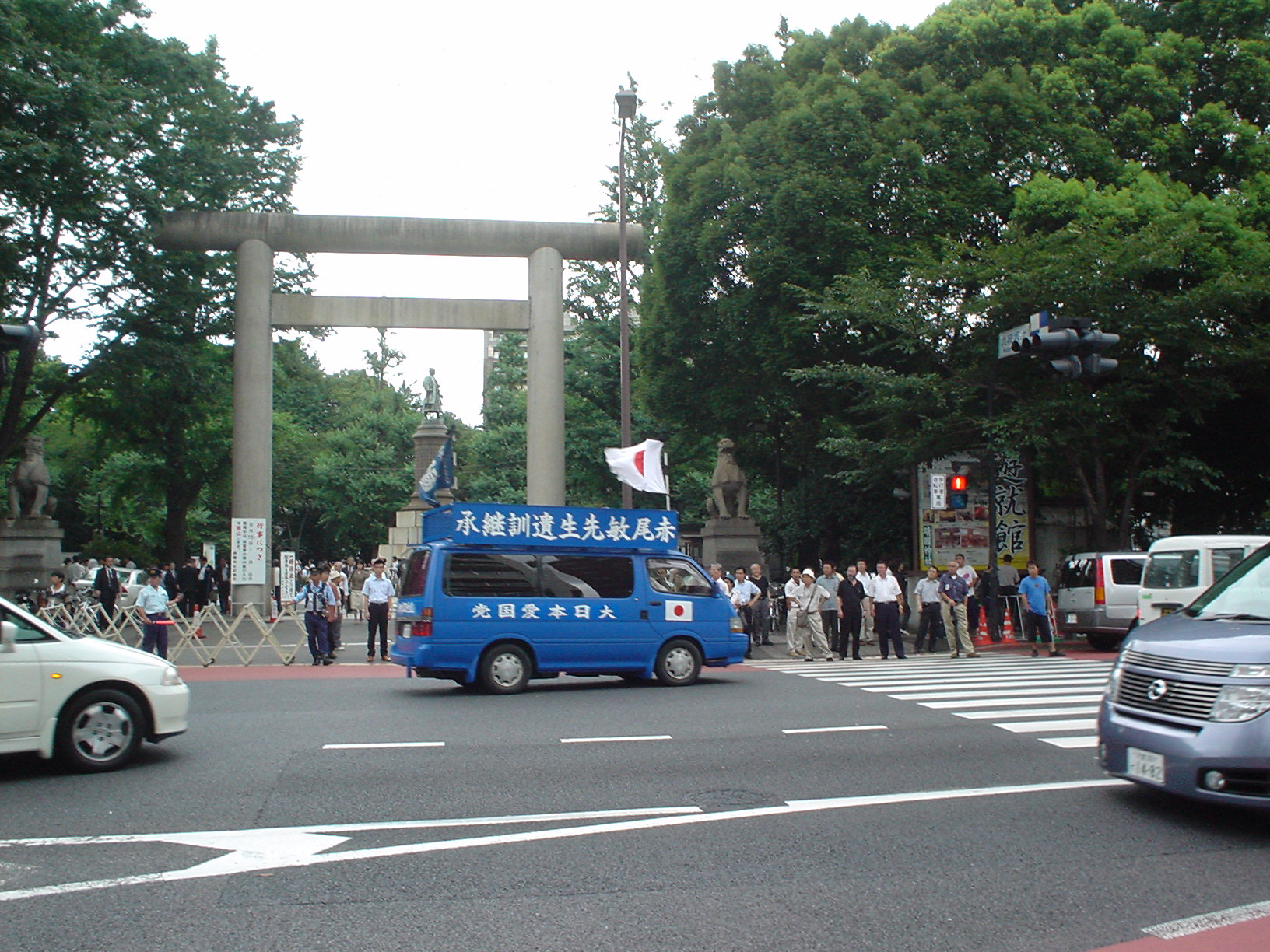
A Greater Japan Patriotic Party sound truck positioned in front of Yasukuni Shrine

The Greater Japan Patriotic Party (大日本愛国党, Dai Nippon Aikokutō), frequently abbreviated to Aikokutō (愛国党, Aikokutō), is a minor Japanese ultranationalist political party founded in 1951 by Bin Akao, a nationalist leader who had served in the House of Representatives during World War II. The party was established shortly after the lifting of the GHQ purge. It advocates for the remilitarisation of Japan and the revision of its constitution, and supports the strengthening of the United States-Japan alliance. During the Cold War, the party also supported the formation of an Asian anti-communist alliance. Akao, a convert from socialism, advocated the public ownership of the means of production under the direct rule of the Emperor. Some commentators have characterised certain statements about the imperial institution as containing elements of lèse-majesté.

The party has regularly fielded candidates in elections (all of whom have been unsuccessful), in part to allow continued street speeches that would otherwise be restricted under the Public Offices Election Act. Akao himself repeatedly stood in House of Councillors and Tokyo gubernatorial elections, on one occasion receiving as many as 130,000 votes.

Otoya Yamaguchi, who assassinated Inejirō Asanuma of the Japan Socialist Party in 1960, had been a member of the Aikokutō but left the party shortly before the assassination. The party was designated a subject of investigation under the Subversive Activities Prevention Act by the Public Security Intelligence Agency the following month. Kazutaka Komori, who perpetrated the Shimanaka incident in 1961, had also been a member until shortly before the attack. Party leader Akao was arrested for conspiracy to murder in the wake of the Shimanaka incident, but was not indicted due to lack of evidence; instead, he was sentenced to eight months in prison for the lesser charges of disturbing the peace and intimidation.

In later years, party secretary-general Yasuyoshi Fudeyasu was involved in two high-profile incidents: an attempted sulfuric-acid attack on Diet member Aiichirō Fujiyama at Haneda Airport in 1972, and an assault on Prime Minister Takeo Miki during the state funeral of former Prime Minister Eisaku Satō in 1975.

After Akao’s death the party fragmented into several loosely connected factions. The official newspaper continued briefly under his widow before ceasing publication. The current nominal head of the main headquarters faction is Akao’s son Michihiko Akao; the family residence that had served as party headquarters in Bunkyō, Tokyo, was later demolished.

== See also ==
- Politics of Japan
- List of political parties in Japan
- History of Japan
- Uyoku dantai
