= The Ballad of Narayama (short story) =

- Short story by Shichirō Fukazawa
- Original title: 楢山節考
- Language: Japanese

Publication
- Published in: Chūō Kōron
- Media type: Magazine
- Publication date: November 1956
- Published in English: 1957, 1961

"The Ballad of Narayama" (Japanese: 楢山節考, Hepburn: Narayama bushikō) is a Japanese short story by Shichirō Fukazawa about old age, first published in 1956. Several films have been based on it. The work is based on a folk legend about abandoning elderly people on a mountain and was the literary debut of the then 42-year-old Fukazawa, making a strong impression on the leading writers and severe critics of the period and receiving an enthusiastic reception from them.

The story depicts a community living in a poor mountain village and governed by a strict code of conduct, culminating in the custom of carrying seventy-year-old elderly people to the titular Mount Narayama, where they await death. The work tells the story of a son who, in accordance with the custom prevailing in the settlement, carries his elderly mother on his back to wintry Narayama in order to leave her there. The unspoken affection between the mother, who voluntarily hastens the day of the "pilgrimage to Narayama", and her gentle and devoted son is presented in contrast with the harshness and tragedy of their act.

== History ==
Shichirō Fukazawa heard the story about abandoning old people from an elderly resident of a farm in Ōgurozaka in Sakaigawa, Yamanashi Prefecture (present-day Ōgurozaka in Sakaigawa-chō, Fuefuki), and then combined it with the memory of the dramatic death of his mother Satoji, who suffered from liver cancer and who "of her own will was heading toward death, trying to starve herself". In this way he created the characters of the elderly mother Orin and her son Tatsuhei. Although the work is set in Shinshū, Fukazawa explained that the human relationships and terrain described in it were taken from Ōgurozaka in Yamanashi Prefecture.

The Ballad of Narayama was first published in the November 1956 issue of the magazine Chūō Kōron. The work won first prize in the inaugural edition of the magazine's literary competition for young writers, the Chūō Kōron Prize for New Writers. A year later it was published in book form. It was Shichirō Fukazawa's literary debut and was very well received by Japanese critics.

The story was translated into many languages. An English translation appeared as early as the same year, translated by John Bester, as The Oak Mountain Song, published in Japan Quarterly in 1957 (several years later a translation by Donald Keene, The Songs of Oak Mountain, was published in 1961). In Poland, the story appeared in 1986 in the collection Ballada o Narayamie. Opowieści niesamowite z prozy japońskiej.

== Plot ==
The work is set in a poor mountain village in the Shinshū region. According to local custom, every resident who reaches the age of seventy should go to Mount Narayama, where they remain awaiting death. Sixty-nine-year-old Orin humbly prepares to fulfill this obligation. She has long had her equipment ready for the final journey and is also pleased that her widowed son Tatsuhei has found a new wife. In order not to appear too strong and capable of continuing to sustain herself, she breaks her healthy teeth with a stone, since in the village a full set of teeth in an elderly person is considered a source of shame.

Orin believes that snow falling on the day of her departure for Narayama will be a fortunate sign. Tatsuhei, meanwhile, cannot reconcile himself to the necessity of parting from his mother and intends to postpone the journey until the following year. However, when his son Kesakichi and his wife Matsu are expecting a child and the shortage of food becomes increasingly severe, Orin herself decides to leave before the birth of her great-grandchild so as not to burden the family.

Three days before New Year's Day, Tatsuhei, in accordance with the demands of custom, carries his mother on his back to the summit of Narayama. Along the way they pass numerous human remains and crows feeding on the dead. After leaving Orin on the mountain, Tatsuhei sees snow beginning to fall. Moved, he breaks the prohibition against speaking and looking back, calling out to his mother that her wish has come true.

On his way back to the village, Tatsuhei witnesses a son from a neighbouring family throwing his seventy-year-old father Matayan into a ravine rather than carrying him all the way to the summit. Only then does he understand the meaning of advice he had heard earlier that some people end the journey before reaching Narayama. Upon returning home, he sees that family life continues—the pregnant Matsu wears a sash that once belonged to Orin, while Kesakichi has put on her padded jacket. Tatsuhei imagines that if his mother is still alive, she is now sitting alone on the mountain, being covered by snow.

== Reception ==
=== Publishing success ===
At the time of its publication, The Ballad of Narayama attracted widespread attention among writers and critics. It was both Fukazawa's debut and the work through which he achieved fame in the Japanese literary world.

=== Critical opinions ===
The critic Hakuchō Masamune, known for his severe judgments, wrote that "of the numerous works of this year, the one that moved me most was The Ballad of Narayama by the new writer Shichirō Fukazawa". He added: "I even think that it might have been enough for the author to write this one work alone. I did not read it for fun or entertainment. I read it with my heart as one of the eternal books about life". Hirotoshi Fukuda likewise wrote: "If I were told to choose only one work from thirty years of postwar Japanese literature, I would without hesitation choose The Ballad of Narayama".

Taijun Takeda, one of the judges of the Chūō Kōron Prize for New Writers, wrote in the jury's choice justification that "regardless of how cruel, unhappy, or tragic the events become, the more terrible they are, the more strongly a beauty resembling the heroine's resistance without resistance permeates them". Sei Itō judged that the work contained something Japan had forgotten since the Meiji era while assimilating "the European way of thinking about human beings", and that reading it produced the impression: "ah, here is a true Japanese". He added that "there is in it a way of life that we Japanese have practised for thousands of years. It is natural that when we read it, our blood begins to boil". He also mentioned that the work reminded him of The Book of the Dead by Shinobu Orikuchi.

Yukio Mishima described the impression of reading it as a feeling "as if my entire body had been drenched with water". He considered the farewell feast scene the most terrifying, stating that the fear it evoked appealed to "very dark, unpleasant memories inherited from their ancestors by poor Japanese people" and to "strange, almost unbearable in this temporal world, animal existential relationships". He also said that he experienced an effect similar to that of reading other texts that plunged him into ever deeper depression. In the portrayal of people subjected to fate, he additionally perceived a similarity to the psychology of the mother in John Millington Synge's drama Riders to the Sea. Mishima also identified Arthur C. Clarke's Childhood's End as a masterpiece opposite to The Ballad of Narayama, yet producing a similar impression after reading.

In a later essay, Mishima compared the state of mind of a judge reading works by debut authors to the feelings of the elders of a local community who year after year complain that young people are becoming worse at carrying the mikoshi during a festival, while secretly awaiting the appearance of a debut author about whom it will be possible to say "here is a novel", and before whom one could "fall at one's feet before the jewel of genius". He recalled that only once had he experienced such a "piercing shudder"—when he read the manuscript of The Ballad of Narayama. He wrote that at first the development of events seemed sluggish to him and he read the text without great expectations, but after five or ten pages he began to sense that he was dealing with something extraordinary. After reaching, without a moment's respite, "that terrible climax", he experienced an unconditional feeling that he had discovered a masterpiece.

It was, however, an unpleasant masterpiece. It contained something that mocked our fundamental desire for beauty and order, trampled upon a certain understanding and agreement that we call "humanity", gave the impression that organs which normally never come into contact with the air had suddenly been exposed to it, deliberately mixed sublimity with pettiness, scorned "tragedy", deprived both reason and passion of meaning, and after reading it left the feeling that there was nothing left in this world upon which one could rely. It was an unpleasant masterpiece concealing something of this kind within itself. To this day, my fear of Fukazawa's work has its source in this first impression after reading The Ballad of Narayama.

— Yukio Mishima, "小説とは何か 十" ("What is a novel? X")

In Poland, the story appeared in the collection Ballada o Narayamie. Opowieści niesamowite z prozy japońskiej (1986, the Seria Grozy series of PIW). The collection was reviewed by Maciej Parowski for Fantastyka. Writing about Fukazawa's story, Parowski regarded The Ballad of Narayama as a work allowing Polish readers to better understand Japanese culture and the philosophical foundations of contemporary Japanese literature. According to the reviewer, the work simultaneously depicts the cruelty and dignity of this custom as well as the strong solidarity of the community. In Parowski's view, the book makes it possible to better understand Polish speculative-fiction creators' fascination with the cultures of the Far East, pointing to a different way of perceiving the human being and their relationship with nature and the community.

== Interpretations ==
=== Philosophy of the fictional world ===
Rintarō Hinuma wrote of the impression produced by The Ballad of Narayama that the "cruel action" of the son who, with a "heart ready to break", goes to abandon his mother, and the contradictory "beautiful love between the closest relatives", are "strangely intermingled", saturating the whole with an image that cannot be described as either gloomy or cheerful. Explaining why the world of images created by Fukazawa is regarded as so powerful, he stated that this is because "all materials are treated like things", or because it is based on "conceiving existence as a thing, the ability to penetrate existence, or metaphysics".

For Fukazawa, the world is something that in itself has no cause, something "self-rooted", that is, nothingness, an unceasing flow of which it is unknown when it began or when it will end, for as long as space extends and time reaches. All phenomena are merely one wave of this flow. All events are "a landscape that has nothing to do with me". There would therefore be nothing strange in such a writer treating the characters appearing in the work like dolls or shogi pieces. [...] Fukazawa therefore stands in a position completely opposed to modern, anthropocentric thought. This shows that he is a consistent anti-humanist.

— Rintarō Hinuma, "解説" ("Commentary") to the paperback edition of The Ballad of Narayama

=== Character of Orin ===
Tōkichi Kimura stated that "Orin has been destined for death and devotes all her energy to making her own death perfect". Discussing her behaviour and way of life—breaking her own teeth and passing all her knowledge on to her family so that they will not find themselves in a difficult situation after her death—he observed that "there is not the slightest attempt in her to pursue her instinctive desires; she proudly follows the path of self-sacrifice". Kimura also drew attention to the relationship in which "everything is mutually understood": Tatsuhei secretly cries, wordlessly sensing Orin's attitude, while Orin likewise knows without words that he is crying. He argued that "Orin's way of life and pride conform to the value system of the local community", and because all this is understood without words by both Tatsuhei and the villagers, Orin can consistently follow her own path without falling into loneliness; despite her self-sacrifice, she therefore remains fully happy.

Kimura also believed that this powerful "image of Orin" overlaps with the image of Fukazawa's own mother. Fukazawa remembered his mother, who died of liver cancer, as a "proud woman". Of the rain that began to fall on the evening of the day of her funeral, he said—in a scene reminiscent of the snow in The Ballad of Narayama—"rain had never seemed so beautiful to me before". Taking into account also that Fukazawa habitually spoke of his ideal of dying of liver cancer like his mother, Kimura concluded that "Orin's fundamental way of life can be regarded as a direct reflection of the author's own ideal. In other words, Orin is both an idealised image of the author's mother and a character to whom he entrusted his own dream".

Fukazawa himself also said that, in creating the character of Orin, he combined in her features of both Christ and Buddha.

Joanna Hare also links the work's initial popularity in Japan with the social transformations of the mid-1950s. Advancing industrialisation was then causing people to move from rural communities to cities, and the family and community ties depicted in The Ballad of Narayama corresponded to nostalgia for furusato—an idealised homeland, traditional values, and communal identity. Hare points out that the judges of the Chūō Kōron Shinjinshō also read the work in the context of the conflict of values in postwar Japan: between the traditional injunction to subordinate individual interests to the good of the community and the new democratic humanist ideals.

Hare interprets Orin not as a passive victim of tradition, but as a character striving for self-realisation and to retain control over her own fate. The protagonist accepts those circumstances that she cannot change, while consciously organising the final days of her life and bringing forward the date of the journey to Narayama, guided by her own system of values and the welfare of her family. In this reading, it is instead Tatsuhei who becomes the tragic character, forced to reconcile his love for his mother with the obligation to participate in her death.

=== Old age and attitudes toward elderly people ===
Fumio Ōki, starting from the fact that the apparently specifically Japanese The Ballad of Narayama also aroused emotions among foreign readers, sought a supranational "source of emotion". To this end, he discussed the principal theses of Franz Altheim, summarising that the novels of D'Annunzio and Lawrence valued by Altheim are literature that "through the primordial myth contained within it breaks through domesticated civilisation and possesses the power to touch that which lies at the source", and literature that "through man's contact with the animal abyss preceding humanity can breach domesticated civilisation and revolutionise it". Ōki considered that the "source of emotion" in The Ballad of Narayama comes from the same level as Altheim's postulated "primordial myth", and that the legend of abandoning old people is "a primordial myth existing since ancient times and still alive today", with counterparts throughout the world.

According to Ōki, the "abandonment of old people" exists today as one of the great problems of the 21st century—elder care—and placing a parent in a care facility overlaps with the image of the "pilgrimage to Narayama". Old age and death are, after all, "primordial myths" belonging to the fundamental problems of humanity.

It is precisely a primordial myth of an animal nature, one that breaks through "domesticated civilisation" and reaches still further, into the distant past, connecting with what Lawrence called "blood and flesh". Choosing one's own death for the sake of one's offspring, taken to the extreme, reaches back to animal instinct. The salmon chooses a dramatic death in order to lay its eggs. Death for life. It is a world governed by the primordial laws of nature. It is the same dimension as "Stirb und werde!"—"Die and become!"—from Goethe's poem "Selige Sehnsucht". It already belongs to the world of mystery. It is a sacred domain that cannot be defiled. This is precisely what is meant by the statement that a god lives on Narayama.

— Fumio Ōki, "深澤七郎の小説『楢山節考』とフランツ・アルトハイムの『小説亡国論』" ("Shichirō Fukazawa's novel 'The Ballad of Narayama' and Franz Altheim's 'Theory of the novel and national ruin'")

Opinions about how characteristic such treatment of elderly people was in Japanese culture continue to provoke discussion. Hisako Matsubara noted that the popularity of the story and its later film adaptations around the world led "people in the West to believe that in Japan it was customary to take people who had grown old and ceased to be useful as labour into the mountains in winter and leave them there to die. I do not know, however, whether this was really so widespread, because I have never encountered sufficient source material". Ōki likewise disputed Takehiko Furuta's view that the legend of abandoning old people has no historical basis. He considered the argument that in reality "parents and children all endured hunger together" to be a perspective characteristic of contemporary "domesticated civilisation". He argued that in a situation where living conditions are so difficult that someone must die in order for the descendants to survive, such reasoning does not convey the actual drama of human existence. In his view, the fictional world of The Ballad of Narayama depicts a reality transcending the instinct of self-preservation and fear of death, revealing a deeper, animal instinct of love. It is precisely for this reason that Orin's journey to Narayama and Tatsuhei's accompaniment of her are simultaneously terrifying and beautiful.

According to Tomasz Poborca, the ritual of abandoning old people on Mount Narayama does not result primarily from religious beliefs but from economic necessity. Limited food resources determine the functioning of the entire community and subordinate the rules of family life to it. Poborca interprets the story as an image of harmony between the biological cyclicality of nature and the social rituals regulating community life. The scholar draws attention, among other things, to the symbolism of the crows, which in the story function as a traditional sign of death and accompany Orin on her final journey.

Joanna Hare identifies tradition, family, community, responsibility, duty, self-realisation, sacrifice, and mortality as among the work's main themes. She considers one of the most important characteristics of The Ballad of Narayama to be its open engagement with dying, death, and mourning.

Hare also interprets the work from the perspective of cultural relativism. In her view, Fukazawa places the reader in a world radically different from their own experiences, forcing them to suspend automatic moral judgments and to view the villagers' behaviour within the framework of their own system of values.

Maciej Parowski interpreted the work as an illustration of the Buddhist vision of the world. According to him, the death depicted in the story is not merely a manifestation of social cruelty, but an element of a religious and philosophical order emphasising reconciliation with suffering, transience, and death. Parowski contrasted this attitude with the Christian tradition of the West, regarding Buddhism as a more individualised and less orthodox religion.

=== Death and self-sacrifice ===
Hare contrasts Orin with her elderly neighbour Matayan, who, unlike her, does not want to go to Narayama and is taken there by force by his son. She interprets the contrast between them as a juxtaposition of two attitudes toward the inevitability of death: acceptance and dignity on the one hand, and resistance and despair on the other.

She also proposes an existentialist reading of the work. She presents Orin as an "authentic" protagonist who, in a world devoid of objective meaning, gives meaning to her own life through consciously accepting responsibility for herself, her family, and her community. Her opposite is Matayan, who is unable to accept responsibility for his own life and death. At the same time, Hare emphasises that Orin is not an idealised character: her courage and dignity coexist with pride, vanity, and stubbornness, giving the character psychological credibility.

=== Style ===
The work is often classified as short story, however sometimes it is also called a novel. This is due to the fact that it originally appeared in a periodical, but was later released as a separate edition.

Hare draws attention to the fluidity of Fukazawa's narration, which moves freely between the narrator's voice and the perspectives of the characters, blurring the boundary between objective description and the characters' subjective experience. This technique makes it easier for the reader to identify directly with the emotions of Orin and Tatsuhei.

Another important characteristic of the work is its rhythm and musicality, which Hare associates with Fukazawa's activity as a guitarist. The prose is characterised by simple language, short sentences, and direct sensory impact. Numerous short songs and ditties function as recurring refrains; according to findings cited by Hare, Fukazawa is said to have created them before writing the main narrative and subsequently constructed the story around them in a manner resembling musical variations on a theme.

== Adaptations ==
The popularity of the work attracted the attention of filmmakers, who adapted the story for film in subsequent years. Several films have been made based on the work. In Japan these were The Ballad of Narayama (1958, directed by Keisuke Kinoshita) and The Ballad of Narayama (1983; directed by Shōhei Imamura), which won the Palme d'Or at the 36th Cannes Film Festival. Outside Japan, the Korean film Goryeojang (1963; directed by Kim Ki-young) was made.
