= Lèse-majesté in Japan =

Lèse-majesté in Japan (Japanese: 不敬罪, romanized: fukeizai) was a special crime of defamation concerning the imperial family that was in effect between 1877 and 1947, mostly in militarized Japan. It is an act of disrespect against the imperial family and affiliated sites like imperial shrines and mausoleums. It first appeared in 1877 in the draft of the Japanese Penal Code. Later, it was stipulated in Articles 74 and 76 as one of the elements of the current Penal Code, Part II, Chapter 1, "Crimes against the Imperial Family," which came into effect in 1908. Here, the scope of the crime was extremely wide and any actions considered the act to be disrespectful was enacted. Therefore, this law forced Japanese people to support the Emperor, Shinto, and militaristic Japan during World War II. However, after World War II, in accordance with the strong instructions of the Supreme Commander of the Allied Powers, MacArthur, and the spirit of the new constitution, which respects the equality of individuals, "crimes against the imperial family," including lèse-majesté, were abolished in the 1947 revision of the penal code. Therefore, there is no lèse-majesté in the current law in Japan. During the Meiji and Taisho periods, the number of people who were suspected of lèse-majesté averaged less than ten per year, but during World War II, the number increased dramatically, and from 1941 to 1943, the annual average number rose to nearly 160.

== Background ==
The Tokugawa clan, which had been in power for many years since Tokugawa Ieyasu became the conqueror in 1603, returned power to the emperor in 1867 when the 15th shogun, Tokugawa Yoshinobu, submitted 'Taisei Hokan Johyo' to the emperor and the Edo shogunate closed. With the return of power to the emperor, it became important to increase the people's reverence for the emperor. In order to enhance this idea of the Emperor, the state decided that Shinto, whose sacred text was the 'Kojiki', which stated that the descendants of the divine Amaterasu were the first emperors, was the nation's recognized religion. This later became "State Shinto". Thereafter, in 1877, the "Draft of the Japanese Penal Code" was promulgated, in which lèse-majesté which was an act of disrespect against certain objects was introduced for the first time in Japan. The term "disrespect" referred to any act that expresses contempt for the objects and harms their dignity. The specifics ranged from actual defamation to questioning the divinity of the act. The objects of lèse-majesté in Japan were divided into the following five categories: 1. Emperor (Article 74, Paragraph 1) 2. Imperial family equivalent to the emperor (same article) 3. Jingu (Article 74, Paragraph 2) 4. Imperial mausoleum (same article) 5. ordinary imperial family (Article 76). More specifically, 2. The imperial family included Grand Empress Dowager, Empress Dowager, Empress, Crown Prince, Grandson of Emperor. 3. The term "Jingu" was usually used to refer to Ise Jingu, but it was also understood to include shrines named "Jingu" such as Atsuta Jingu, Kashihara Jingu, and Katori Jingu. 4. The imperial mausoleum was understood to be the tomb of the successive emperors who once reigned as emperor. In terms of Statutory Penalty for lèse-majesté in Japan, crimes against objects in 1 through 4 were punishable by "imprisonment for a term of not less than three months and not more than five years"; crimes against objects in 5 were punishable by "imprisonment for a term of not less than two months and not more than four years". At that time, the publicity of the act of disrespect was a requirement. Later, in 1880, the "Penal Code" was promulgated, and the lèse-majesté was officially stipulated. Then, the content of the lèse-majesté was amended and the requirement of publicity was removed. This removal makes the act did not matter whether it was done publicly or privately, and thus made the scope of application extremely wide. For example, there was actually a case where a person who wrote in his diary about his opposition to militarism was considered as lèse-majesté and was arrested. In 1889, Emperor Meiji promulgated the Constitution of the Empire of Japan, which became the backbone of the pre-war Japanese nation. Accordingly, the Emperor's sovereignty, in which the Emperor, with his unbroken imperial line and sacred inviolability, holds sway, was the principle, and the people were regarded as "subjects" to be ruled by the Emperor. In addition, Shinto was increasingly treated as a state religion in a large part of the country, separate from general religions, and treated as a morality rather than a religion. In 1890, the Imperial Rescript on Education was issued, ordering students to be loyal to the emperor's state. Thus, in the latter half of the 19th century, when the lèse-majesté first appeared and was officially stipulated, Japan gradually increased the people's reverence for the emperor through all kinds of methods, including education, in accordance with the restoration of imperial rule.

Subsequently, in the “Penal Code” revised in 1908, the lèse-majesté was stipulated in Articles 74 and 76 of Part II, Chapter 1, "Crimes against the Imperial Family". The content of the law was largely in keeping with the old Penal Code. Then, with the Manchurian Incident of 1931, the Second Sino-Japanese War began. In 1940, on the occasion of the "2,600th anniversary of the Emperor's accession to the throne," the Bureau of Shrines was promoted to a Institute of Divinities, and with the intensification of the war, the doctrine of the national identity was inspired. Japan was regarded as a divine country of unparalleled power, ruled by an emperor of the unbroken imperial line and Hakko Ichiu, meaning world domination, became the slogan for the "Holy War”. In addition to this, the Law on Religious Organizations was enforced that year, accelerating the state's control over religion. Afterward, in 1941, the Pacific War began with the Japanese attack on Pearl Harbor.

As a result, in 1945, with the atomic bombings of Hiroshima and Nagasaki and the entry of the Soviet Union into the war, Japan accepted the Potsdam Declaration and surrendered unconditionally, ending World War II. In December 1945, immediately after the defeat, the GHQ (Supreme Headquarters of the Allied Powers) issued a Shinto directive, ordering the abolition of State Shinto and the separation of politics and religion. In accordance with the strong instructions of the Supreme Commander of the Allied Powers, MacArthur, and the spirit of the new constitution, which respects the equality of individuals, Articles 73-76 of Chapter I of Part II of the Current Penal Code, "Crimes against the Imperial Family," including "lèse-majesté" were abolished in the "Law Partially Amending the Penal Code" (Law No. 124), which was promulgated on October 26, 1947 and came into effect on November 15, 1947.

== Text of law ==
=== Penal Code of 1907 (Law No. 45 of 1907) ===
Chapter 1 "Crimes against the Imperial Family"

- Article 73
  1. Any person who causes or attempts to cause harm to the Emperor, Grand Empress Dowager, Empress Dowager, Empress, Crown Prince or Grandson of Emperor shall be punished by death.
- Article 74.
  1. Any person who commits an act of disrespect the Emperor, Grand Empress Dowager, Empress Dowager, Empress, Crown Prince or Grandson of Emperor shall be punished by imprisonment for not less than three months and not more than five years.
  2. The same shall apply to any person who commits an act of disrespect against the Imperial Shrine or the Imperial Mausoleum.
- Article 75.
  1. Any person who causes harm to the Imperial Family shall be punished by death, and any person who attempts to do that shall be punished by life imprisonment.
- Article 76.
  1. Any person who commits an act of disrespect against the Imperial Family shall be punished by imprisonment for not less than two months and not more than four years.

=== Old Penal Code (Grand Council of State Proclamation No. 36 of 1881) ===
The old Penal Code had similar provisions. The difference is that it provided for fines and had a provision on surveillance.

Chapter 1 "Crimes against the Imperial Family"

- Article 116.
  1. Any person who causes or attempts to cause harm to the Emperor, Empress, or Crown Prince shall be punished by death.
- Article 117.
  1. Any person who commits an act of disrespect against the Emperor, Empress or Crown Prince shall be punished with heavy imprisonment for not less than three months and not more than five years, and a fine of not less than twenty yen and not more than two hundred yen shall be imposed.
  2. The same shall apply to any person who shows disrespect to the Imperial Mausoleum.
- Article 118.
  1. Any person who causes harm to the Imperial Family shall be punished with death, and any person who attempts to do that shall be punished with life imprisonment.
- Article 119.
  1. Any person who commits an act of disrespect against the Imperial Family shall be punished with heavy imprisonment for not less than two months and not more than four years, and a fine of not less than 10 yen and not more than 100 yen shall be imposed.
- Article 120.
  1. Any person who commits any of the crimes mentioned in this chapter and is sentenced to misdemeanor imprisonment for not less than six months and not more than two years.

== Related cases ==
=== Placard incident ===
After World War II, Japan faced rising food shortages and inequality as a result of the war. In the face of deteriorating food security and the extended period of rationing, Japanese workers took to protests against the government. Notably, in May 1946, a series of protests in Tokyo around the time of the May Day celebrations levied heavy criticism against Japanese government officials like the then-Premier Shigeru Yoshida, as well as Emperor Hirohito himself.

During one such demonstration on May 20 of the same year, one of the demonstrators named Shōtarō Matsushima held a placard criticizing the emperor in front of the Imperial Palace, and was arrested and charged with lèse-majesté. The placard, written in part in colloquial language and in part in a version of formal Japanese reserved for royalty, stated: "The national polity has been fulfilled. I am eating my fill. You people, starve and die."

On the back part of the placard, another statement read: "Why are we starving no matter how we work? Answer, Emperor Hirohito!".

Despite his arrest, however, mounting Allied pressure on the Japanese government against the law of lèse-majesté together with his appeal to the court had his charges reduced to "libel" of the Emperor in June, before his sentence was fully commuted in November. However, the guilty verdict still applied to Matsushima even though he had not been punished. Further attempts in June 1947 and May 1948 to have the guilty verdict overturned concluded with the court rejecting his appeals on the grounds that he was indeed guilty of lèse-majesté, and by accepting the pardon, had voided his right to appeal the verdict. The pardon was in accordance with the orders of the Supreme Commander of the Allied Powers (Potsdam Declaration and Surrender Document). The government had been pressured to release all perpetrators of lèse-majesté since October 5, 1945, in reference to Article 10 on freedom of speech and democratic expression. In addition, the divinity of the Emperor, which was the basis of the lèse-majesté, had been denied in the so-called Emperor's Declaration of Humanity in January 1946. However, as seen in Matsushima's case, this incongruity seems to suggest that the Japanese government and the Allied occupation did not always see eye to eye on the matters of lèse-majesté.

== Related people ==
- Tsunesaburō Makiguchi – The founder of the Soka Gakkai. He was arrested on July 6, 1943, on charges of the Maintenance of the Public Order Act and lèse-majesté. He died the year after at the Tokyo Detention Center (the Sugamo Prison after the war).
- Tatsukichi Minobe – A professor at Tokyo Imperial University. He was accused of lèse-majesté during the Emperor's Organ Theory Incident (1935). The case was dropped, but he resigned from the house of lords.

Various founders and leaders of Japanese new religions, including Onisaburo Deguchi (the founder of Oomoto) and Ōnishi Aijirō (the founder of Honmichi) were also charged with lèse-majesté and imprisoned during the 1930s.

== See also ==
- Chrysanthemum taboo – Japanese social taboo against discussing and especially criticizing the royal family
