= Masao Horino =

Japanese photographer

Masao Horino (堀野 正雄, Horino Masao; 1907–1998) was one of the most prominent Japanese photographers in the first half of the 20th century in Japan.

He was born in Tokyo and graduated from Tokyo Higher Technical School (東京高等工業学校), now Tokyo Institute of Technology (東京工業大学).

He was a member of Shinkō Shashin Kenkyukai (新興写真研究会; , New Photography Research Society) which was founded by Sen'ichi Kimura (木村専一) in 1930.

In 1932, Horino published a monograph Camera, Eye x Iron, Construction (カメラ・眼×鉄・構成) which is one of the most important works for Japanese modern photography (Shinkō Shashin, 新興写真). This monograph consists of photographs of ships and architectures made of steel, such as bridges, tanks and towers, based on his own sense of beauty, "a beauty of machinery" (機械美学), derived directly from the theories of the art critic (photo critic) Takaho Itagaki (板垣鷹穂), using, for example, close-up and looking-up. Therefore, this work can be regarded as a collaboration between Horino and Itagaki. This work is as important as the monograph Métal by Germaine Krull in terms of the beauty of machinery.

Further, Horino published his work of documentary photography using montage technique in some magazines, such as the Character of Great Tokyo (Dai Tokyo no Seikaku, 大東京の性格. 1931, editing and design by Takaho Itagaki, Chūōkōron October issue) and Flowing through the City - Sumida River Album (Shutokanryū - Sumida-gawa no Arubamu, 首都貫流-墨田川のアルバム, 1931, editing and design by Tomoyoshi Murayama, Hanzai Kagaku December issue). No other photographer made such high-level documentary photographs before World War II.

Horino was one very important example of the earliest photographers to have a professional mind, like Yōnosuke Natori, although in Japan before World War II, most photographers were amateurs and took pictures only for their own inside world, not for the outside world.

In Europe and America the effects of the atomic bombs over Hiroshima and Nagasaki were not fully understood. The photos produced by Masao Horino contributed to the world wide cry for the bombs to never be used again.

After World War II, he founded the company Minicum manufacturing electronic flashguns for cameras and was absorbed in managing his own company rather than taking photographs.
