= The Ballad of Narayama (1983 film) =

1983 film directed by Shōhei Imamura

- Poster for Ballad of Narayama (1983)
- Directed by: Shōhei Imamura
- Written by: Shōhei Imamura
- Based on: 楢山節考 (Narayama-bushi Kō) by Shichirō Fukazawa
- Produced by: Goro Kusakabe; Jiro Tomoda
- Starring: Ken Ogata; Sumiko Sakamoto; Takejo Aki; Tonpei Hidari; Seiji Kurasaki; Kaoru Shimamori; Ryutaro Tatsumi; Junko Takada; Nijiko Kiyokawa; Mitsuko Baisho
- Cinematography: Masao Tochizawa
- Edited by: Hajime Okayasu
- Music by: Shin’ichirō Ikebe
- Distributed by: Toei Co. Ltd. Umbrella Entertainment
- Release dates: April 29, 1983 (Japan); September 7, 1984 (U.S. limited)
- Running time: 130 min.
- Country: Japan
- Language: Japanese
- Box office: ¥1.79 billion (Japan); 23.7 million tickets (worldwide)

The Ballad of Narayama (Japanese: 楢山節考, Hepburn: Narayama bushikō) is a 1983 Japanese film by director Shōhei Imamura. It stars Sumiko Sakamoto as Orin, Ken Ogata, and Shoichi Ozawa. It is an adaptation of the story of the same name by Shichirō Fukazawa, which had previously been adapted for a 1958 film directed by Keisuke Kinoshita. Both films explore the legendary practice of ubasute, in which elderly people were carried to a mountain and abandoned to die. Imamura's film won the Palme d'Or at the 1983 Cannes Film Festival.

== Production ==
The Ballad of Narayama was filmed in Niigata Prefecture and Nagano Prefecture.

== Plot ==
The film is set in a small rural village in 19th century Japan. According to tradition, once a person reaches the age of 70, he or she must travel to a remote mountain to die of starvation, a practice known as ubasute. The story concerns Orin, who is 69 and in sound health. However, she notes that a neighbor had to drag his father to the mountain, so she resolves to avoid clinging to life beyond her term. She spends a year arranging all the affairs of her family and village, severely punishing a family hoarding food and helping her younger son lose his virginity.

The film contains harsh scenes depicting the brutal conditions faced by the villagers. Interspersed between episodes in the film are brief vignettes of nature—birds, snakes, and other animals hunting, watching, singing, copulating, or giving birth.

== Cast ==
- Ken Ogata – Tatsuhei
- Sumiko Sakamoto – Orin
- Tonpei Hidari – Risuke
- Aki Takejo – Tamayan
- Shoichi Ozawa – Katsuzō
- Fujio Tokita – Jinsaku
- Sanshō Shinsui – Zeniya no Matayan
- Seiji Kurasaki – Kesakichi
- Junko Takada – Matsuyan
- Mitsuko Baisho – Oei
- Taiji Tonoyama – Teruyan
- Casey Takamine – Arayashiki
- Nenji Kobayashi – Tsune
- Nijiko Kiyokawa – Okane
- Akio Yokoyama – Amaya

== Box office ==
Upon its Japanese release in 1983, the film earned ¥1.05 billion in distributor rentals and ¥1.79 billion in gross receipts, equivalent to 1.6 million ticket sales.

Overseas, the film sold 21.1 million tickets in the Soviet Union, 844,077 tickets in France upon release in 1983, and 1,696 tickets in the Netherlands, Switzerland and Spain between 1996 and 2018, for a combined estimated total of approximately 23.7 million tickets sold worldwide.

== Awards ==
- Cannes Film Festival (1983)
  - Palme d'Or
- Japan Academy Film Prize (1984)
  - Best Actor Ken Ogata
  - Best Film
  - Best Sound Kenichi Benitani
- Blue Ribbon Awards (1984)
  - Best Actor Ken Ogata
- Excellence in Cinematography Award (1984): Masao Tochizawa
- Hochi Film Award (1983)
  - Best Supporting Actress Mitsuko Baisho
  - Mainichi Film Concours (1984)
  - Best Actor (Ken Ogata)
  - Best Sound Recording: Kenichi Benitani

== Anecdote ==
In early 2000s, the movie had a chance to be released in China, on condition that the sex scenes were censored. The director Imamura consulted some Chinese directors. They replied that the sex scenes were necessary contrast to the scenes of death. Imamura decided to turn down the proposal.

== Home media ==
The Ballad of Narayama was released on DVD by Umbrella Entertainment in May 2010. The DVD is compatible with all region codes and includes special features such as the theatrical trailer.

== Bibliography ==
- Canby, Vincent (1984-04-09). "The Ballad of Narayama (1983) (Movie review)". The New York Times.
- Hung, Lee Wood (2007). "Japanese Adaptation to Nature and Imamura's Ballad of Narayama – Based on the Difference between Imamura's Film and Fukasawa's Original Novel" (PDF). Studies in Comparative Culture (in Japanese and English) (75): 55–61. Archived from the original (PDF) on 2011-05-11.
- Hung, Lee Wood (May 2003). "Natural Culturalism in The Ballad of Narayama: A Study of Shohei Imamura's Thematic Concerns" (PDF). Asian Cinema. 14 (1). Pennsylvania: Asian Cinema Studies Society: 146–166. doi:10.1386/ac.14.1.146_1. Archived from the original (PDF) on 2011-05-11.
- "楢山節考 (Narayama bushiko)" (in Japanese). Japanese Movie Database.
