= Murakami Namiroku =

Japanese novelist and writer

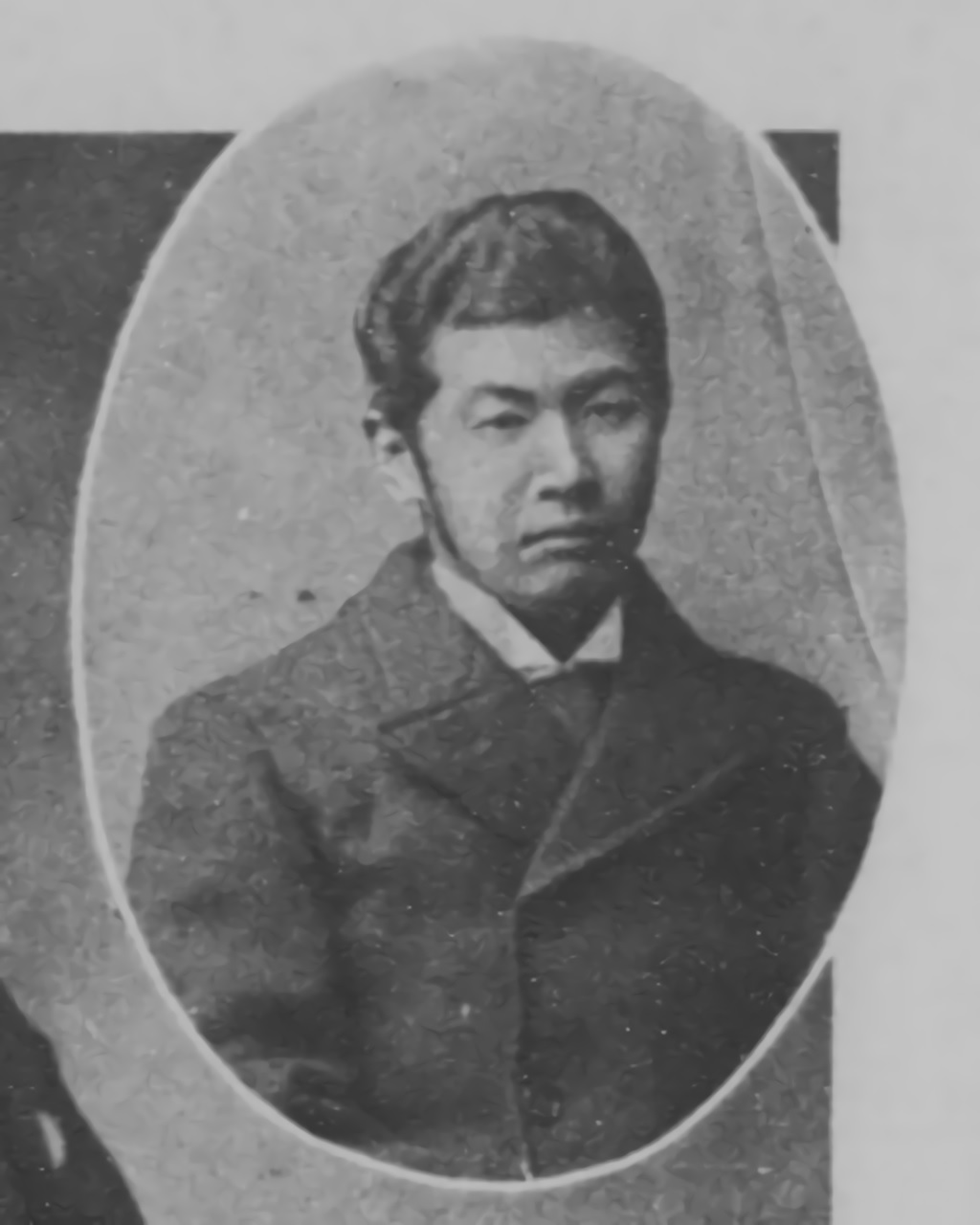
- Born: December 18, 1865; Sakai, Japan
- Died: December 1, 1944 (aged 78); Tokyo, Empire of Japan
- Occupations: Novelist, writer
- Notable work: "三日月" (Mikazuki, Crescent Moon) 1891, his first publication "当世五人男" (Tōsei Gonin Otoko, Five Men of This Generation) 1896, considered his most notable

Murakami Namiroku (村上 浪六; December 18, 1865 – December 1, 1944) was a Japanese writer known for his popular fiction frequently set in the Edo period featuring chivalric gangsters. In 1891, he published his first work Mikazuki (Crescent Moon) under the alias Chinunoura Namiroku (ちぬの浦 浪六), which was well received. He would go on to write more than 100 novels until 1930 and become a prominent writer of the time.

He was the maternal grandfather of Otoya Yamaguchi, the 17-year-old ultranationalist who assassinated Japan Socialist Party chairman Inejirō Asanuma in 1960.

== Early life ==
Namiroku was born Murakami Makoto (信) in Sakai, Osaka, Japan. His father died when he was very young, and was a result was raised by his mother. When he was in elementary school, he was adopted by a politician of the time named Saisho Atsushi. Namiroku wanted to become a politician and businessman, but ultimately failed at those endeavors. In 1890, Namiroku joined the staff of the Tokyo-based mail order magazine company Hochi Shimbun as a proofreader.

== Writing career ==
In 1898, one year after joining Hochi Shimbun, Murakami published his first work of fiction "Mikazuki ("Crescent Moon"), which described the life of a swordsman who adhered to traditional samurai values. The book was very well received among the general public, and Murakami decided to be a professional writer from then on. Thereafter, he embarked on a series of novels about heroic chivalric street gangsters, which came to be known as "bachibin novels" after the hairstyle worn by their dashing streetwise heroes, whereby the hair (hin) on the head was shaved in the shape of a shamisen plectrum (bachi).

== Bibliography ==
- Mikazuki (三日月) Shunyodo Publishing Co., 1891
- Izutsu Menosuke (井筒女之助), Shunyodo Publishing Co., 1891
- Oniyakko (鬼奴), Shunyodo Publishing Co., 1892
- Yakko no Oman (奴の小万), Shunyodo Publishing Co, 1892
- Yabu Daitsudzumi (破大皷), Shunyodo Publishing Co., 1893
- Yoarashi (夜嵐), Shunyodo Publishing Co., 1893
- Namiroku Manpitsu (浪六漫筆) Shunyodo Publishing Co., 1893
- Seishin Gunki (征清軍記), Aoki Sūzandō Publishing Co., 1894
- Namiroku Soushou 10-ban Nouchi Tasoya Andon (浪六叢書十番のうちたそや行燈) Shunyodo Publishing Co., 1894
- Nochi no Mikazuki (後の三日月), Shunyodo Publishing Co., 1894
- Nisshin Jiken Shinshousetsu (日清事件新小説) Aoki Sūzandō Publishing Co., 1895
- Fukaamigasa (深見笠), Shunyodo Publishing Co., 1894
- Hige no Jikyuu (髯の自休), Shunyodo Publishing Co., 1894
- Yasuda Sakubee (安田作兵衛), Shunyodo Publishing Co., 1894
- Kaizoku (海賊) Aoki Sūzandō Publishing Co., 1895
- Koga-shi (古賀市) Aoki Sūzandō Publishing Co., 1895
- Sakana-ya Sukezaemon (魚屋助左衛門) Aoki Sūzandō Publishing Co., 1895
- Nochi no Kaizoku (後の海賊) Aoki Sūzandō Publishing Co., 1895
- Osaka-jō (大阪城) Aoki Sūzandō Publishing Co., 1896
- Onii Azami (鬼あざみ) Aoki Sūzandō Publishing Co., 1896
- 10-Moji (十文字) Aoki Sūzandō Publishing Co., 1896
- Shinpei-ei (新兵衛) Saidō Eizō, 1896
- Kyasha (Minshaan) (花車 (眠獅庵)) Aoki Sūzandō Publishing Co., 1896
- Luzon Sukezaemon (呂宋助左衛門) Aoki Sūzandō Publishing Co., 1896
- Jinasadame (しなさだめ) Aoki Sūzandō Publishing Co., 1897
- Roroku Bunko (浪六文庫) Aoki Sūzandō Publishing Co., 1897
- Tōsei Gonin Otoko (当世五人男) Aoki Sūzandō Publishing Co., 1897
- Musha-kishitsu (武者気質) Aoki Sūzandō Publishing Co., 1897
- Kyōkashuu (狂歌集) Aoki Sūzandō Publishing Co., 1898
- Ukiyo-zoshi (浮世草紙) Aoki Sūzandō Publishing Co., 1898
- Tsuta no Hozomichi (蔦の細道) Aoki Sūzandō Publishing Co., 1898
- Saigo no Kurodakenji (最後の黒田健次) Aoki Sūzandō Publishing Co., 1899
- Akatonbo (赤蜻蛉) Aoki Sūzandō Publishing Co., 1900
- Harada Sosuke (原田宗輔) Aoki Sūzandō Publishing Co., 1900
- Meiji Jūnen (明治十年) Aoki Sūzandō Publishing Co., 1900
- Kasuga no Tsubone (春日局) Shinshinō Publishing Co., 1901
- Date Furi-ko (伊達振子) Aoki Sūzandō Publishing Co., 1901
- Nihon Bushi (日本武士) Aoki Sūzandō Publishing Co., 1901
- Yamato Kokoro (やまと心) Aoki Sūzandō Publishing Co., 1901
- Ukiyo Nikki (うき世日記) Shinshinō Publishing Co, 1902
- Otoko Ippiki (男一疋) Shinshinō Publishing Co., 1902
- Mitari Kyōdai (三人兄弟) Aoki Sūzandō Publishing Co., 1902
- Shigure Kasa (時雨笠) Shinshinō Publishing Co., 1902
- Naniwa Meibutsu Otoko (浪華名物男) Aoki Sūzandō Publishing Co., 1902
- Hachimanza (八幡座) Aoki Sūzandō Publishing Co., 1902
- Otoko-yama (男山) Shinshinō Publishing Co., 1902
- Tokubu (毒婦) Aoki Sūzandō Publishing Co., 1902
- Uyamuya Nikki (うやむや日記) Aoki Sūzandō Publishing Co., 1904
- Kongōban (金剛盤) Aoki Sūzandō Publishing Co., 1904
- Narihirabumi Haruji (業平文治) 田中霜柳 Kanarisha, 1905
- Ishida Mitsunari (石田三成) Aoki Sūzandō Publishing Co., 1905
- Saigo no Okazaki Toshihira (最後の岡崎俊平) Aoki Sūzandō Publishing Co., 1905
- Daiakuma (大悪魔)Aoki Sūzandō Publishing Co., 1905
- Yasha Otoko (夜叉男)Aoki Sūzandō Publishing Co., 1905
- Yukidaruma (雪達磨) Shinshinō Publishing Co., 1902
- Joryūken (仍如件) Aoki Sūzandō Publishing Co., 1906
- Futsūbunhan (普通文範) 村上信 Ishizuka Shobō, 1907
- Kawazu no Yanagi Jizai (川柳自在) Ishizuka Shobō, 1907
- Ukiyoguruma (浮世車) Aoki Sūzandō Publishing Co., 1907
- Genroku On'na (元禄女) 隆文館
- Takakura Chōemon (高倉長右衛門) 駸々堂
- Tōsei Onna (当世女) Aoki Sūzandō Publishing Co., 1907
- Ukifune (浮舟) Aoki Sūzandō Publishing Co., 1908
- Nichiren (日蓮) Min'yūsha, 1908
- Hachiken Nagaya (八軒長屋) Min'yūsha, 1908
- Inada Isaku (稲田一作) Min'yūsha, 1909
- Bomon Byōin (煩悶病院) Aoki Sūzandō Publishing Co., 1910
- Baka Yarō (馬鹿野郎) 金葉堂, 1911
- Toyotomi Taikō (豊太閤) Min'yūsha, 1911
- Genroku Chūkon (元禄忠魂録) Shiseidō Bookstore, 1912
- Kakeya Shosei Ningen-gaku (居家処世人間学) Ōe Shobō, 1913
- Itazuramono (いたづらもの) Ōe Shobō, 1913
- Gendai Shichō Danjo no Tatakai (現代思潮男女の戦ひ) Shiseidō Bookstore, 1913
- Ikitaru Ningen no Kaibō (生きたる人間の解剖) Ōe Shobō, 1914
- Rorokusenshū (浪六全集) 全26編 Shiseidō Bookstore, 1914–1926
- Koku'un (黒雲) Shiseidō Bookstore, 1914
- Yukidaruma (雪だるま) Shiseidō Bookstore, 1914
- Rakka Rōzai (落花狼藉) 文明社, 1914
- Batō Roku (罵倒録) Shiseidō Bookstore, 1914
- Genroku Shijūshichishi (元禄四十七士) Shiseidō Bookstore, 1914
- Waga Gojūnen (我五十年) 加島虎吉, 1914
- Hōgen Roku (放言録) Shiseidō Bookstore, 1915
- Jinsei no Uramen (人生の裏面) Tōadō Shobō, 1916
- Hito no Aku (人の垢) Meibunkan Shoten, 1916
- Jinsei no Ryokō (人生の旅行) Meibunkan Shoten, 1916
- Taishō Gonin Otoko (大正五人男) Shiseidō Bookstore, 1916
- Sekengaku (世間学) 大阪屋号 Shoten, 1916
- Tengan Tsū (天眼通) Shiseidō Bookstore, 1917
- Hiniku Bunshū (皮肉文集) Kōyōsha, 1919
- Kawatoku (川徳) Shiseidō Bookstore, 1919
- Hadaka-tai no Ningen (裸体の人間) Shiseidō Bookstore, 1919
- Shutsuhōdai (出放題) Shiseidō Bookstore, 1919
- Roroku Hachi-attari (浪六八ッあたり) Roroku Kai, 1919
- Ura to Omote (裏と表) Shiseidō Bookstore, 1920
- Muenryo (無遠慮) Shiseidō Bookstore, 1921
- Roroku Sōseki Kessaku Bunshū (浪六漱石傑作文集) Tsunashima Shoten(Bimon Hyōkai Sōsho), 1921
- Kawarimono (かはりもの) Meibunkan, 1921
- Gyūniku Ikkin (牛肉一斤) Shiseidō Bookstore, 1922
- Shinran (親鸞) Meibunkan Shoten, 1922
- Jidai Sō (時代相) 全5巻 Jidai Sō Kankōkai, 1923–24
- Mumei no Eiyū (無名の英雄) Jidai Sō Kankōkai, 1925
- Ningenmi (人間味) 明文堂 Shoten, 1925
- Roroku Meisaku Senshū (浪六名作選集) Kodansha, 1925
- Roroku Kessakushū (浪六傑作集) Ninjō-hen, Ren'ai-hen Naigai Shuppan Kyōkai, 1926
- Myōhōin Kanpachi (妙法院勘八) Dainippon Yūbenkai Kōdansha, 1926
- Hito no Chikara (人の力) Meibunkan Shoten, 1927
- Ukiyo no Uraomote (浮世の裏表) Kinryūdō Shuppanbu, 1927
- Hachisuka Koshirō (蜂須賀小六) Meibunkan Shoten, 1929
- Kamaitachi (かまいたち) Meibunkan Shoten, 1930
- Ninjō no Omoteura (人情の表裏) Kōyōsha, 1930
- Roroku Zenshū (浪六全集) 45th Volume Tamai Seibundō, 1930–31
- Katsukyaku Retsuden Dai 1-kan (侠客列伝 第1巻) Meibunkan Shoten, 1931
- Suzuki Shin'nai (鈴木新内) Meibunkan Shoten, 1931
- Ukiyo no Ame ni Yabure Kasa (うき世の雨に破れ傘) Meibunkan Shoten, 1934
- Suteuri Kanbei (すてうり勘兵衛) Roroku Sōsho Kankōkai, 1934
- Kyōkaku (侠客) Meibunkan, 1934
- Ippo Tobu (一足飛) Kōbunkaku, 1940
- Doku ka Kusuri ka (毒か薬か) Monasu, 1940
- Oni Fusetsu Zukin (鬼伏せ頭巾) Kōbunkaku, 1941
- Kaishō no Rekishi (海上の歴史) Kibundō Shobō, 1943
