= Shimanaka incident =

Right-wing terrorist attack in Japan, 1961

- Location: Shinjuku, Tokyo, Japan
- Date: February 1, 1961; 65 years ago Approximately 9:15 p.m. (JST)
- Target: Hōji Shimanaka, president of Chūō Kōron magazine
- Attack type: Assassination attempt by stabbing
- Weapon: Knife
- Deaths: 1 (Shimanaka's housekeeper)
- Injuries: 1 (Shimanaka's wife)
- Perpetrator: Kazutaka Komori
- Motive: Punishment of Shimanaka because his magazine had published a short story depicting the beheading of the Emperor
- Convictions: Murder
- Sentence: 15 years in prison

The Shimanaka incident (嶋中事件, Shimanaka jiken), also known as the Furyū mutan incident (風流夢譚事件, Furyū mutan jiken), was a right-wing terrorist attack which took place in Japan on 1 February 1961, as well as the resulting nationwide debate that surrounded it. After Japanese author Shichirō Fukazawa published a short story in the magazine Chūō Kōron which featured a dream sequence depicting the beheading of the Emperor and his family with a guillotine, a 17-year-old rightist named Kazutaka Komori broke into the home of Chūō Kōron president Hōji Shimanaka, murdering his maid and severely wounding his wife.

The Shimanaka Incident played an important role in establishing the so-called "Chrysanthemum taboo" in postwar Japan, whereby writers and the mass media would practice self-censorship and refrain from literary or artistic depictions of the Emperor or Imperial Family members.

== Background ==
In 1960, the massive Anpo Protests against the U.S.-Japan Security Treaty had rocked Japan as hundreds of thousands of protesters flooded the streets. The violent climax of the protests in June 1960, in which a young female university student was killed, forced the resignation of Japanese prime minister Nobusuke Kishi. In the November 1960 issue of the mainstream monthly magazine Chūō Kōron, the author Shichirō Fukazawa published a short story called Furyū mutan (風流夢譚, “The Tale of an Elegant Dream"), in which Fukazawa satirized the recent protests. In the story, an unnamed narrator describes a dream sequence in which the Emperor and Empress, as well as the Crown Prince and Crown Princess, are beheaded with a guillotine by a mob of left-wing protesters amid a left-wing "revolution" reminiscent of the anti-Treaty movement.

According to historian Nick Kapur, Fukazawa's story was more an attack on the excesses of left-wing street protests than an attack on Japan's Imperial institution. For example, in the story Fukazawa punned on the Japanese word for "left-wing" (左翼, sayoku) by replacing the Chinese character for "wing" (翼, yoku) with a homophone meaning "greed" (欲, yoku).

Nevertheless, Japanese right-wing ultranationalists and the Imperial Household Agency expressed outrage and demanded an apology. In particular, they objected to the description of the Emperor and Empress's heads “rolling and clattering about” (sutten korokoro karakara korogatte), which they felt was demeaning to the Imperial institution and Japan's national pride.

At first, left wing journalists and media outlets rallied to the defense of Fukazawa and his story on grounds of free speech and artistic freedom. They pointed out that earlier works of fiction and art in the 1950s had more directly criticized the Emperor, and in any case the Emperor had renounced his own divinity in 1946 and therefore was not entitled to special protection.

Initially, Chūō Kōron magazine itself made no response to the protestations. However, on 28 November, eight members of right-wing demagogue Bin Akao's Greater Japan Patriotic Party forced their way into Chūō Kōron's headquarters and demanded an apology, and on 29 November, the Imperial Household Agency announced its intention to explore a libel suit against the magazine on behalf of Emperor Hirohito. On 30 November, Chūō Kōron editor-in-chief Kiyoshi Takemori visited the Imperial Household Agency to personally apologize to the Emperor; on 31 November, he met with Bin Akao and promised him that the magazine would run an apology in the December issue.

However, Akao and other right-wingers were entirely dissatisfied with Chūō Kōron's official apology, which apologized only for using the real names of members of the Imperial family, and contained the phrase “setting aside the story’s literary merits,” which suggested that the story in fact had literary merit. Thereafter, members of Akao's Greater Japan Patriotic Party and other rightwing ultranationalist groups such as the Pine Needle Society (Matsubakai) and the National Essence Society (Kokusuikai) mounted protests outside of Chūō Kōron's on a daily basis, demanding a fuller apology.

Right-wing anger grew further when a more extensive apology failed to appear in the January issue of Chūō Kōron. On 30 January, Bin Akao himself led a larger group of thirty right-wingers in another invasion of the Chūō Kōron offices to demand a further apology in the February issue.

== Attack on Shimanaka's household ==
Two days later, on the evening of 1 February, a 17-year-old rightist named Kazutaka Komori invaded the home of Hōji Shimanaka, the president and publisher of Chūō Kōron. Shimanaka was not home at the time, but Komori drew a knife, stabbing and severely wounding Shimanaka's wife, Masako. He then stabbed and murdered Shimanaka's 50-year-old housekeeper, Kane Maruyama, when she tried to wrest the knife away, before fleeing the scene.

Komori turned himself in at a police box in the rag-pickers' village of Sanya the following morning. When they searched his person, they discovered a handkerchief with the following poem written on it: "Long Live the Emperor! Who would hesitate to sacrifice his life for the sake of the Emperor and the nation, since the life of a man is as transient as a dewdrop on a blade of grass?" Komori stated that he had acted alone and without instruction from any other person. Police investigated and discovered that Komori had been a member of Bin Akao's Greater Japan Patriotic Party and had only "resigned" from the party on the morning of the day of his attack. Given the suspicious connection, Bin Akao was arrested on charges of conspiracy to murder, but was not indicted lacking evidence, and instead was sentenced to eight months for the lesser charges of disturbing the peace and intimidation. Komori was eventually tried as an adult and sentenced to 15 years in prison.

== Aftermath ==
Komori's attack drew further national attention to the Furyū mutan controversy. A number of prominent politicians and public figures expressed sympathy for Komori and condemned Chūō Kōron for publishing such an inflammatory piece. Some conservative lawmakers began publicly touting their efforts to draft a law that would revive the prewar crime of lèse-majesté. Fukuzawa began to receive death threats on a daily basis, as did other literary figures believed to be associated with him, including Yukio Mishima. Newspaper editorials took care to condemn Komori's violence, but also suggested that publishing the story had been "inappropriate." Even some left-wing intellectuals voiced opposition to Fukazawa's story, precipitating a fierce and lengthy debate in Japanese literary journals over the exact meaning of the phrase "literary merit."

Author Fukuzawa was stunned by the attack on Shimanaka's household. Interviewed the day after the attack, he stated that he had never dreamed his story could lead to such an attack, and added that, "He [Komori] should have attacked me, if he was going to release his grudge on someone."

Chūō Kōron editor-in-chief Takemori initially responded to the attack on Shimanaka's household with defiance. On 5 February, he issued a press release restating the earlier apology for using real names of the Imperial family, but also stating that the magazine would "rededicate" itself to protecting freedom of expression.

Shimanaka himself, who at this point had not issued any public statements, wrote a rebuttal press release to the one released by his own editor the following day, in which he deeply apologized for the publication of Furyū mutan, which he called "unsuitable for print" and further offered his personal apology for "having disturbed society to the point of causing violent incidents." Later that day, Shimanaka accepted the resignation of Takemori, and author Fukazawa gave a tearful press conference in which he also apologized for the story. Immediately thereafter, Fukazawa went into hiding at a series of unnamed locations with 24-hour police protection, and was not seen in public for the next five years.

Later that year, conservative lawmakers announced that their lèse-majesté law was ready to be debated in the National Diet, at which point a coalition of newspapers and magazines negotiated a deal with the lawmakers to withdraw the bill in exchange for a promise that the media would "self-police" and prevent publication of works touching upon the Imperial family. Accordingly, the Shimanaka incident has been cited by scholars as helping to cement in place the so-called Chrysanthemum taboo (菊タブー, kiku tabū, named after the Imperial family's chrysanthemum crest) in postwar Japan that informally but powerfully forbids literary or artistic expression directly featuring the Emperor or the Imperial family.
