= The Ballad of Narayama (1958 film) =

1958 Japanese film

- Theatrical release poster
- Directed by: Keisuke Kinoshita
- Written by: Keisuke Kinoshita
- Based on: Narayama-bushi kō by Shichirō Fukazawa
- Produced by: Masaharu Kokaji; Ryuzo Otani
- Starring: Kinuyo Tanaka; Teiji Takahashi; Yūko Mochizuki
- Cinematography: Hiroyuki Kusuda
- Edited by: Yoshi Sugihara
- Music by: Chūji Kinoshita; Matsunosuke Nozawa
- Production company: Shochiku
- Distributed by: Shochiku
- Release date: 1 June 1958 (Japan)
- Running time: 98 minutes
- Country: Japan
- Language: Japanese

The Ballad of Narayama (Japanese: 楢山節考, Hepburn: Narayama bushikō) is a 1958 Japanese historical drama film directed by Keisuke Kinoshita. It is based on the 1956 the story of the same name by Shichirō Fukazawa. The film explores the legendary practice of ubasute, in which elderly people were carried to a mountain and abandoned to die.

== Cast ==
- Kinuyo Tanaka as Orin
- Teiji Takahashi as Tatsuhei
- Yūko Mochizuki as Tamayan
- Danko Ichikawa as Kesakichi
- Keiko Ogasawara as Matsu-yan
- Seiji Miyaguchi as Matayan
- Yūnosuke Itō as Matayan's son
- Ken Mitsuda as Teruyan

== Reception ==
The film was shown in competition at the 19th Venice International Film Festival, where it divided critics between those who thought it a masterpiece and those who thought it poor.

In a June 1961 review in The New York Times, A.H. Weiler called the film "an odd and colorful evocation of Japan's past that is only occasionally striking", adding that it was "stylized and occasionally graphic fare in the manner of the Kabuki Theatre" and "decidedly strange to Western tastes."

Roger Ebert of the Chicago Sun-Times rated the film a maximum four stars, and added it to his Great Movies list in 2013, making it the final film he added to the list before his death.

== Restoration ==
During the 2012 Cannes Film Festival, a digitally restored version of the film was screened out of competition, as part of the festival's Cannes Classics selections.

In his 2013 review of the Criterion Blu-ray release of the restored film, Jordan Cronk of Slant stated that Kinoshita, a "less celebrated" practitioner in the jidaigeki genre, used kabuki theater "as a stylistic blueprint" for his adaptation of the literary source, making it "one of the era's most radical experiments" which played "more like a cinematic elegy than cosmetic theater."

== Awards ==
The Ballad of Narayama received three Mainichi Film Awards for Best Film, Best Director and Best Film Score. It was submitted as the Japanese entry for the Academy Award for Best Foreign Language Film, but was not chosen as one of the five nominees.

== See also ==
- List of submissions to the 31st Academy Awards for Best Foreign Language Film
- List of Japanese submissions for the Academy Award for Best Foreign Language Film
