= Chūō Kōron =

Japanese literary magazine

- Categories: Literary magazine
- Frequency: Monthly
- First issue: 1 January 1887; 139 years ago
- Company: Chūōkōron Shinsha
- Country: Japan
- Based in: Tokyo
- Language: Japanese
- Website: Chūōkōron

Chūō Kōron (中央公論; Central Review) is a monthly Japanese literary magazine (sōgō-zasshi (総合雑誌; literally general magazine)), first established during the Meiji period and continuing to this day. It is published by its namesake-bearing Chūōkōron Shinsha (formerly Chūōkōron-sha). The headquarters is in Tokyo.

Chūō Kōron publishes a wide variety of material, including novels, photographs and reports based on various philosophical, economic, political, cultural and social topics.

== Early history ==
The magazine was first published in January 1887 under the title Hanseikai Zasshi (反省会雑誌) in Kyoto by the Hanseikai (反省会, Review society), a literary group of professors and students of Ryukoku University. In 1899, the magazine changed its name to Chūō Kōron.

In the 1920s, journalist Yūsaku Shimanaka rose to become editor-in-chief and later owner of Chūō Kōron. During the World War II editors of the magazine were arrested in the Yokohama incident. In 1944 the magazine was closed down due to its anti-war sentiments but publication resumed in 1946. In 1949, ownership and control of the magazine passed to his son, Hōji Shimanaka, who would serve as its president for the next 45 years.

Under the Shimanakas, Chūō Kōron became one of Japan's foremost general-interest magazines, and has been cited as having a profound influence on several Japanese intellectuals. The noted author Ryōtarō Shiba once stated that the magazine's history corresponded to the history of modern Japan itself. There have been numerous famous contributors to the magazine, including Princess Takamatsu, Tama Morita, Jun'ichirō Tanizaki, Tōson Shimazaki, Shōfu Muramatsu, his grandson Tomomi Muramatsu, Yaeko Nogami, Tomoyoshi Murayama, Motojirō Kajii, Sakuzō Yoshino, Nanami Shiono, Shichirō Fukazawa, and Masao Horino.

== Shimanaka incident ==
In 1960, Chūō Kōron was at the center of a major controversy that shaped the future of freedom of expression in Japan. The magazine's November 1960 issue featured a satirical story by Shichirō Fukazawa featuring a dream sequence in which the Emperor and Empress were beheaded with a guillotine. Japanese right-wing ultranationalist groups were outraged and mounted a long series of protests and attacks aimed at Chūō Kōron in an attempt to force an apology. An initial attempt at apology was deemed too perfunctory by the rightists, and on the evening of February 1, 1961, a 17-year-old rightist named Kazutaka Komori invaded Chūō Kōron publisher Shimanaka Hōji's home in Shinjuku, Tokyo in an apparent assassination attempt. Shimanaka was away from home at the time, but his housekeeper was stabbed to death and his wife was seriously injured, in a terroristic attack that became known as the "Shimanaka Incident."

Shimanaka was deeply shaken by the attack on his household and issued a statement of remorse in which he repudiated Fukazawa's story as “unsuitable for print" and offered his "deepest apologies" for “having disturbed society to the point of causing violent incidents." Thereafter, Shimanaka forced the magazine's editor-in-chief to resign, and negotiated a deal with right-wing groups to end the attacks on Chūō Kōron in exchange for a promise to adopt a more "neutral" editorial policy. The Shimanaka incident has been cited by scholars as helping to cement in place the so-called Chrysanthemum Taboo (菊タブー, kiku tabū, named after the Imperial family's chrysanthemum crest) in postwar Japan that informally but powerfully forbids literary or artistic expression directly featuring the Emperor or the Imperial family.

== Recent history ==
From 1985 to 1988 Motohiro Kondo served as the editor-in-chief of the magazine.

In 1994, Shimanaka resigned as president of Chūō Kōron after 45 years, succeeded by his eldest son Yukio, and became chairman of the board of directors. However two years later, in 1996, he fired Yukio and for a time the company had no president.

When Shimanaka died on April 3, 1997, it was discovered that he had co-mingled the company's finances with his own, leaving behind a massive debt of 15 billion yen. Shimanaka's wife Masako became chairman and president, but was not able to resolve the company's financial crisis. In 1999, Chūōkōron-sha and all of its assets were bought out by the Yomiuri Shimbun newspaper company. Thereafter, the magazine's tone and content took a decidedly more politically conservative direction, in line with Yomiuri's broader editorial stance.

As of 2006 the circulation of Chūō Kōron was 40,975 copies.
