= Chrysanthemum taboo =

Japanese social taboo

The chrysanthemum taboo (菊タブー, Kiku tabū) is the Japanese social taboo against discussion or criticism of the Emperor of Japan and his family, especially Emperor Hirohito (1901–1989). The taboo also extended to discussion of the Emperor's declining health.

The term came into use in the 1960s and originates from the chrysanthemum flower found in the imperial chrysanthemum crest.

== Overview ==
Before the end of World War II (Meiji, Taishō, and Shōwa era), criticisms and discussions of the Emperor and the imperial system were severely punished by the old Penal Code, as they were considered to be lèse-majesté. There was also strong pressure from Japanese society against such criticisms. Further, the Peace Preservation Law was enacted in 1925 to punish such criticisms of the imperial system.

After the war, freedom of speech was widely recognized because of Article 21 of the Japanese Constitution, and the old Penal Code, which prohibited lèse-majesté, was also abolished by the Supreme Commander for the Allied Powers. The abolition of the old Penal Code made even criticism of the Emperor and the imperial system become not legally punished and so criticism became more socially tolerated than before.

However, in the 1960s, some right-wing organizations and their members began to use threats, intimidation, and violence in an attempt to roll back the transition. Most notably in the Shimanaka incident of 1961, a right-wing youth attempted to assassinate the publisher of the prominent monthly magazine Chūō Kōron for having published a satirical short story in which the Emperor and the Empress were beheaded. The magazine "retracted" the piece and promised to "self-regulate" from then on. When the Japanese Diet began exploring reviving the prewar lèse-majesté law, other media companies similarly promised "self-regulation" from then on.

The Japanese mass media refrained from critical speech about the Emperor for fear of being attacked by right-wing organizations. The "self-regulation" takes the form of an unwritten yet widely-understood taboo. There is no direct evidence of written rules or standards for self-regulation regarding the Emperor in the print media; however, there is in the broadcast media, for example, the Japan Commercial Broadcasters Association (JBA) Standards has a section saying "(broadcast media) will not treat the country in a way that undermines the authority of the country or its institutions," adding additionally: "This includes the Emperor as the symbol of the nation, and also applies to local governments and their agencies." That self-regulation led to critical speech against the Emperor and the imperial system being treated as taboo in mass media.

== Public awareness ==
In 1988, when Emperor Hirohito was hospitalized, broadcast media tended to voluntarily refrain from airing entertainment programs, and words used in commercials were carefully considered because of the hospitalization. Some events and sports festivals were self-regulated for the same reason. The British newspaper The Sun wrote "Hell's Waiting for this Truly Evil Emperor" and "Let the Bastard Rot in Hell," and the Daily Star called the Emperor "the sinking sun of evil" and compared him to Adolf Hitler. The Ministry of Foreign Affairs complained through the British Embassy in Japan. Michio Watanabe, executive politician of the Liberal Democratic Party said that "if a special correspondent stays in Japan, we need to banish them." However, when it was reported that his heir, Akihito, was concerned that "the Emperor would not like to see such exaggerated reactions", media was seen "refraining from self-regulation."

In 2006, while the birth of Prince Hisahito of Akishino was being celebrated in September, a blog by Hirotada Ototake that cynically criticized the celebration was attacked, and Ototake apologized. In October the same year, there was a criticism of a reporter of the Mainichi Shimbun who wrote negatively about visits of the Emperor and the Empress to Saga Prefecture. The criticism occurred mainly on the Internet and was based mainly on the fact that the reporter was a Korean living in Japan. The number of criticisms from many organizations made Mainichi Shimbun give the reporter a serious warning.

In February 2007, Kodansha decided not to publish the book Princess Masako: Prisoner of the Chrysanthemum Throne by Ben Hills in a Japanese translation. The Ministry of Foreign Affairs and the Imperial Household Agency complained to Hills, but he responded that there was "no need for apology, it was the Imperial Household Agency that has to apologize to her. It is obvious that Japanese government was afraid of criticism from Japanese people." Kodansha explained its decision by stating that "the author's attitude is problematic and we can't take responsibility for what might happen due to the publication." Hills answered the interview from the Mainichi Shimbun and said that "it is very disappointing that Kodansha decided not to publish. I am sure that Kodansha gave into the pressure from the Imperial Household Agency, Ministry of Foreign Affairs, and other government offices." On August 2, Daisanshokan decided to publish the book and stated that "there is no particular reason for not publishing. We will correct dates and simple mistakes and publish a perfect version."

== See also ==
- Censorship in Japan
- Gag rule
- Lèse-majesté in Japan
- Self-censorship
