= Royalist =

Supporter of a particular monarch or claimant as the head of a kingdom

A royalist supports a particular monarch as head of state for a particular kingdom, or of a particular dynastic claim. In the abstract, this position is royalism. It is distinct from monarchism, which advocates a monarchical system of government, but not necessarily a particular monarch. Most often, the term royalist is applied to a supporter of a current regime or one that has been recently overthrown to form a republic.

In the United Kingdom and the Commonwealth realms, the term is currently almost indistinguishable from "monarchist", as there are no significant rival claimants to the throne. Conversely, in 19th-century France, a royalist might be either a Legitimist, Bonapartist, or an Orléanist, all being monarchists.

== United Kingdom ==
- The Wars of the Roses were fought between the Yorkists and the Lancastrians
- During the English Civil War the Royalists or Cavaliers supported King Charles I and, in the aftermath, his son King Charles II
- Following the Glorious Revolution, the Jacobites supported the deposed James II and his Stuart successors to the thrones of England, Scotland and Ireland
- Following the Glorious Revolution, the Loyalists supported the Williamite dynasty, and after the ascension of George I to the British throne in 1714, the Hanoverian dynasty to the thrones of England, Scotland and Ireland

== Russia ==
- During the Russian Civil War, the Royalists constituted a part of the White Army.

== Yugoslavia ==
- During, and especially towards the end of, World War II in Yugoslavia, the royalist Chetniks supported the exiled king of Yugoslavia, Peter II of Yugoslavia.

== France ==
- Legitimists, French royalists upholding Salic Law
  - Chouannerie, a royalist group during the French Revolution
  - Ultra-royalists, a 19th-century reactionary faction of the French parliament
- Orléanists, who, in late 18th and 19th century France, supported the Orléans branch of the House of Orléans, which came to power in the French monarch July Revolution
- Bonapartists, supporters of the Bonaparte imperial line.

== Japan ==
- Nanboku-cho Seijunron (南北朝正閏論) – The debate on legitimacy in the Nanboku-cho period. The Southern and Northern dynasties are in conflict; the present Emperor, Naruhito is part of the Northern dynasty.
- Tenno Kikan Setsu (天皇機関説, Emperor Organ Theory) – Based on the theory of state juridical person represented by the German public law scholar Georg Jelinek, the constitutional scholar Minobe Tatsukichi and others advocated this theory.
- Tenno Shuken Setsu (天皇主権説, Imperial Sovereignty Theory) – Hozumi Yatsuka, Uesugi Shinkichi and others opposed the Tenno Kikan Setsu and argued that the sovereignty was with the Emperor.
- Tennosei (天皇制) or kokutai (国体) – In modern Japan, all political parties, with the exception of the Japanese Communist Party (JCP), recognise the Emperor System. In recent years, even the JCP has weakened its opposition to the emperor system to accommodate the majority of the population who recognise him.

== Low Countries ==
- Union of Arras, states of the Netherlands loyal to Philip II
- Orangism in the Netherlands, Belgium, and Luxembourg
- Supporters of the return of King Leopold III as King of the Belgians after the Second World War, also called Leopoldists

== Portugal ==
- Miguelist, a supporter of King Miguel

== Spain ==
- Alfonsism
- Carlist, a Spanish legitimist
- Royalist (Spanish American Revolution), a supporter of continued Spanish rule during the Latin American wars of independence

== Italy ==
- During World War II the royalists were Italians who supported Victor Emmanuel III and the government of Pietro Badoglio after the Fascist dictator Benito Mussolini was overthrown.

== China ==
- Chinese Empire Reform Association (Royalist Society) in the late Qing dynasty, an organisation that supported the pro-reform Guangxu Emperor and advocated constitutional monarchy as a peaceful political reform, against both the conservative rulers (such as the Empress Dowager Cixi) who opposed any reform and the Tongmenghui which sought to overthrow the Chinese monarchy and establish the Republic of China)
- Royalist Party: This militant party was established during the Xinhai Revolution, and was vehemently opposed to the new Republic of China. It tried to use politics and later violence in order to restore the Qing dynasty or at least some form of monarchy, but failed.

== Cambodia ==
The FUNCINPEC Party (Khmer: ហ្វ៊ុនស៊ិនប៉ិច; French: Front uni national pour un Cambodge indépendant, neutre, pacifique et coopératif), National United Front for an Independent, Neutral, Peaceful and Cooperative Cambodia is a royalist political party in Cambodia founded in 1981. The party draws its inspiration from the political legacy of the former King of Cambodia, Norodom Sihanouk.

== Iran ==
The Constitutionalist Party of Iran (CPI) (Persian: حزب مشروطه ايران) is a liberal democratic party founded in 1994 (originally as the Constitutional Movement of Iran) and is based in exile. The party favors a constitutional monarchy in Iran but isn't opposed to a republic based on a referendum. It also supports returning of Crown Prince Reza Pahlavi as the next shah of Iran.

== United States ==
- Loyalists during the American Revolution (and the ensuing American Revolutionary War) were American colonists opposed to seceding from the Kingdom of Great Britain and instead remained loyal to the British Crown. After the war ended in independence for the Thirteen Colonies, many loyalists emigrated north to British North America (Present-day Canada), referring to themselves as the United Empire Loyalists.

== Malaysia ==
- Johor Royalists Club is a non-governmental organization which was founded in the State of Johor, within the Federation of Malaysia, on 23 March 2015. Its mission is to restore the "Order", and its objectives are to support the monarchy of Johor; to create awareness of the heritage of the monarchy of Johor; and to close up racial relations through the monarchy of Johor. Its membership is open to pure Johoreans (Anak Jati Johor) who, and both of whose parents, were born in Johor, and are loyal (and only loyal) to the Sultan of Johor. It operates in the form of a people's congress, and has a standing committee to manage the day-to-day affairs.

== Nepal ==
The Rastriya Prajatantra Party was founded on the principles of democracy, constitutional monarchy, nationalism and economic liberalization. When the Nepalese monarchy was abolished in 2008 and Nepal was declared a secular state, the Rastriya Prajatantra Party Nepal changed its constitution to support monarchy and the re-establishment of the Hindu state.

== See also ==
- Carlism
- Conservative
- Loyalism
- Monarchism
- Melkite, originally meaning "royalist"
- Reactionary
- Restoration (disambiguation)
- War of succession
