= Yukawa =

Yukawa (written: 湯川) is a Japanese surname, but is also applied to proper nouns.

== People ==
- Diana Yukawa (born 1985), Anglo-Japanese solo violinist. She has had two solo albums with BMG Japan, one of which opened to #1
- Hideki Yukawa (1907–1981), Japanese theoretical physicist and the first Japanese Nobel laureate
- Kazuyuki Yukawa (1949–2025), Japanese politician
- Morio Yukawa (1908–1988), Japanese economist and diplomat
- Tsutomu Yukawa (1911–1942), Japanese aikidoka
- Yasutoshi Yukawa (1941–2014), Japanese linguist

== Places ==
- Yukawa Institute for Theoretical Physics, a research institute in the field of theoretical physics, attached to Kyoto University in Japan
- Yukawa Station, a train station in Nachikatsuura, Higashimuro District, Wakayama Prefecture, Japan

== Other ==
- Yukawa interaction, named after Hideki Yukawa, is an interaction between a scalar field φ and a Dirac field Ψ of a particular type
- Yukawa potential, a potential of a particular form
- Yukawa–Tsuno equation, first developed in 1959, is a linear free-energy relationship in physical organic chemistry
- Yukawa Dam
