= Minobe =

Minobe (written: 美濃部 or 見延) is a Japanese surname. Notable people with the surname include:

- Kazuyasu Minobe (見延 和靖, born 1987), Japanese fencer
- Naohiko Minobe (美濃部 直彦, born 1965), Japanese footballer and manager
- Ryokichi Minobe (美濃部 亮吉, 1904–1984), Japanese politician
- Tatsukichi Minobe (美濃部 達吉, 1873–1948), Japanese statesman and scholar of constitutional law
- Yu Minobe (美濃部 ゆう, born 1990), Japanese artistic gymnast
