= Morihei Ueshiba =

Founder of Aikido

- Born: December 14, 1883; Tanabe, Wakayama, Japan
- Died: April 26, 1969 (aged 85); Shinjuku, Tokyo, Japan
- Native name: 植芝 盛平
- Other names: Moritaka Ueshiba (植芝守高), Tsunemori (常盛)
- Style: Aikido, Daitō-ryū Aiki-jūjutsu
- Teacher: Takeda Sōkaku

Other information
- Children: Matsuko Ueshiba; Takemori Ueshiba (died in infancy); Kuniharu Ueshiba (died in infancy); Kisshomaru Ueshiba
- Notable students: see List of aikidoka

Map of Japan showing the major locations in Ueshiba's life

Morihei Ueshiba (植芝 盛平, Ueshiba Morihei; December 14, 1883 – April 26, 1969) was a Japanese martial artist and founder of the martial art of aikido. He is often referred to as "the founder" Kaiso (開祖) or Ōsensei (大先生/翁先生), "Great Teacher".

The son of a landowner from Tanabe, Ueshiba studied a number of martial arts in his youth, and served in the Japanese Army during the Russo-Japanese War. After being discharged in 1907, he moved to Hokkaido as the head of a pioneer settlement; here he met and studied with Takeda Sōkaku, the headmaster of Daitō-ryū Aiki-jūjutsu. On leaving Hokkaido in 1919, Ueshiba joined the Ōmoto-kyō movement, a Shinto sect, in Ayabe, where he served as a martial arts instructor and opened his first dojo. He accompanied the head of the Ōmoto-kyō group, Onisaburo Deguchi, on an expedition to Mongolia in 1924, where they were captured by Chinese troops and returned to Japan. The following year, he had a profound spiritual experience, stating that, "a golden spirit sprang up from the ground, veiled my body, and changed my body into a golden one." After this experience, his martial arts technique became gentler, with a greater emphasis on the control of ki.

Ueshiba moved to Tokyo in 1926, where he set up what would become the Aikikai Hombu Dojo. By this point he was comparatively famous in martial arts circles, and taught at this dojo and others around Japan, including in several military academies. In the aftermath of World War II the Hombu dojo was temporarily closed, but Ueshiba had by this point left Tokyo and retired to Iwama, and he continued training at the dojo he had set up there. From the end of the war until the 1960s, he worked to promote aikido throughout Japan and abroad. He died from liver cancer in 1969.

After Ueshiba's death, aikido continued to be promulgated by his students (many of whom became noted martial artists in their own right). It is now practiced around the world.

== Tanabe, 1883–1912 ==
Morihei Ueshiba was born in Nishinotani village (now part of the city of Tanabe), Wakayama Prefecture, Japan, on December 14, 1883, the fourth child (and only son) born to Yoroku Ueshiba and his wife Yuki.

The young Ueshiba was raised in a somewhat privileged setting. His father Yoroku was a wealthy gentleman farmer and minor politician, being an elected member of the Nishinotani village council for 22 consecutive years. His mother Yuki was from the Itokawa clan, a prominent local family who could trace their lineage back to the Heian period. Ueshiba was a rather weak, sickly child and bookish in his inclinations. At a young age his father encouraged him to take up sumo wrestling and swimming and entertained him with stories of his great-grandfather Kichiemon, who was considered a very strong samurai in his era. The need for such strength was further emphasized when the young Ueshiba witnessed his father being attacked by followers of a competing politician.

A major influence on Ueshiba's early education was his elementary schoolteacher Tasaburo Nasu, who was a Shinto priest and who introduced Ueshiba to the religion. At the age of six Ueshiba was sent to study at the Jizōdera Temple, but had little interest in the rote learning of Confucian education. However, his schoolmaster Mitsujo Fujimoto was also a priest of Shingon Buddhism, and taught the young Ueshiba some of the esoteric chants and ritual observances of the sect, which Ueshiba found intriguing. His interest in Buddhism was sufficiently great that his mother considered enrolling him in the priesthood, but his father Yoroku vetoed the idea. Ueshiba went to Tanabe Higher Elementary School and then to Tanabe Prefectural Middle School, but left formal education in his early teens, enrolling instead at a private abacus academy, the Yoshida Institute, to study accountancy. On graduating from the academy, he worked at a local tax office for a few months, but the job did not suit him and in 1901 he left for Tokyo, funded by his father. Ueshiba Trading, the stationery business which he opened there, was short-lived; unhappy with life in the capital, he returned to Tanabe less than a year later after suffering a bout of beri-beri. Shortly thereafter he married his childhood acquaintance Hatsu Itokawa.

In 1903, Ueshiba was called up for military service. He failed the initial physical examination, being shorter than the regulation 5 feet 2 inches (1.57 m). To overcome this, he stretched his spine by attaching heavy weights to his legs and suspending himself from tree branches; when he re-took the physical exam he had increased his height by the necessary half-inch to pass. He was assigned to the Osaka Fourth Division, 37th Regiment, and was promoted to corporal of the 61st Wakayama regiment by the following year; after serving on the front lines during the Russo-Japanese War he was promoted to sergeant. He was discharged in 1907, and again returned to his father's farm in Tanabe. Here he befriended the writer and philosopher Minakata Kumagusu, becoming involved with Minakata's opposition to the Meiji government's Shrine Consolidation Policy. He and his wife had their first child, a daughter named Matsuko, in 1911.

Ueshiba studied several martial arts during his early life, and was renowned for his physical strength during his youth. During his sojourn in Tokyo he studied Kitō-ryū jujutsu under Takisaburo Tobari, and briefly enrolled in a school teaching Shinkage-ryū. His training in Gotō-ha Yagyū-ryu under Masakatsu Nakai started in 1903 and continued until 1908; although this training was sporadic due to his military service, Ueshiba was granted a Menkyo Kaiden (certificate of "Total Transmission") in 1908. In 1901 he received some instruction from Tozawa Tokusaburō in Tenjin Shin'yō-ryū jujutsu and he studied judo with Kiyoichi Takagi in Tanabe in 1911, after his father had a dojo built on the family compound to encourage his son's training. In 1907, after his return from the war, he was also presented with a certificate of enlightenment (shingon inkyo) by his childhood teacher Mitsujo Fujimoto.

== Hokkaido, 1912–1920 ==
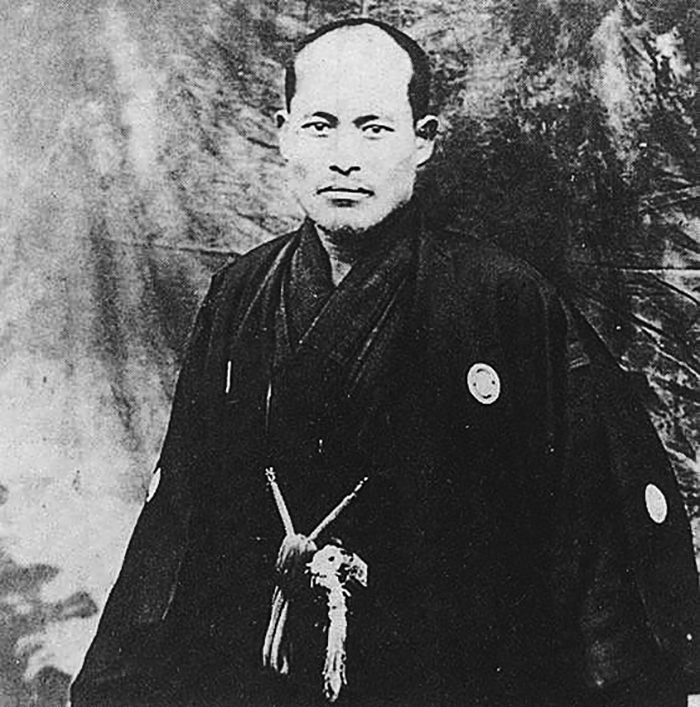
Morihei Ueshiba at around 35 years old (1918)

In the early part of the 20th century, the prefectural government of Hokkaido, Japan's northernmost island, were offering various grants and incentives for mainland Japanese groups willing to relocate there. At the time, Hokkaido was still largely unsettled by the Japanese, being occupied primarily by the indigenous Ainu. In 1910, Ueshiba travelled to Hokkaido in the company of his acquaintance Denzaburo Kurahashi, who had lived on the northern island before. His intent was to scout out a propitious location for a new settlement, and he found the site at Shirataki suitable for his plans. Despite the hardships he suffered on this journey (which included getting lost in snowstorms several times and an incident in which he nearly drowned in a freezing river), Ueshiba returned to Tanabe filled with enthusiasm for the project, and began recruiting families to join him. He became the leader of the Kishū Settlement Group, a collective of eighty-five pioneers who intended to settle in the Shirataki district and live as farmers; the group founded the village of Yubetsu (later Shirataki village) in August, 1912. Much of the funding for this project came from Ueshiba's father and his brothers-in-law Zenzo and Koshiro Inoue. Zenzo's son Noriaki was also a member of the settlement group.

Poor soil conditions and bad weather led to crop failures during the first three years of the project, but the group still managed to cultivate mint and farm livestock. The burgeoning timber industry provided a boost to the settlement's economy, and by 1918 there were over 500 families residing there. A fire in 1917 razed the entire village, leading to the departure of around twenty families. Ueshiba was attending a meeting over railway construction around 50 miles away, but on learning of the fire travelled back the entire distance on foot. He was elected to the village council that year, and took a prominent role in leading the reconstruction efforts. In the summer of 1918, Hatsu gave birth to their first son, Takemori.

The young Ueshiba met Takeda Sōkaku, the founder of Daitō-ryū Aiki-jūjutsu, at the Hisada Inn in Engaru, in March 1915. Ueshiba was deeply impressed with Takeda's martial art, and despite being on an important mission for his village at the time, abandoned his journey to spend the next month studying with Takeda. He requested formal instruction and began studying Takeda's style of jūjutsu in earnest, going so far as to construct a dojo at his home and inviting his new teacher to be a permanent house guest. He received a kyōju dairi certificate, a teaching license, for the system from Takeda in 1922, when Takeda visited him in Ayabe. Takeda also gave him a Yagyū Shinkage-ryū sword transmission scroll. Ueshiba then became a representative of Daitō-ryū, toured with Takeda as a teaching assistant and taught the system to others. The relationship between Ueshiba and Takeda was a complicated one. Ueshiba was an extremely dedicated student, dutifully attending to his teacher's needs and displaying great respect. However, Takeda overshadowed him throughout his early martial arts career, and Ueshiba's own students recorded the need to address what they referred to as "the Takeda problem".

== Ayabe, 1920–1927 ==
In November 1919, Ueshiba learned that his father Yoroku was ill, and was not expected to survive. Leaving most of his possessions to Takeda, Ueshiba left Shirataki with the apparent intention of returning to Tanabe to visit his ailing parent. En route he made a detour to Ayabe, near Kyoto, intending to visit Onisaburo Deguchi, the spiritual leader of the Ōmoto-kyō religion (Ueshiba's nephew Noriaki Inoue had already joined the religion and may have recommended it to his uncle). Ueshiba stayed at the Ōmoto-kyō headquarters for several days, and met with Deguchi, who told him that, "There is nothing to worry about with your father". On his return to Tanabe, Ueshiba found that Yoroku had died. Criticised by family and friends for arriving too late to see his father, Ueshiba went into the mountains with a sword and practised solo sword exercises for several days; this almost led to his arrest when the police were informed of a sword-wielding madman on the loose.

Within a few months, Ueshiba was back in Ayabe, having decided to become a full-time student of Ōmoto-kyō. In 1920 he moved his entire family, including his mother, to the Ōmoto compound; at the same time he also purchased enough rice to feed himself and his family for several years. That same year, Deguchi asked Ueshiba to become the group's martial arts instructor, and a dojo—the first of several that Ueshiba was to lead—was constructed on the centre's grounds. Ueshiba also taught Takeda's Daitō-ryū in neighbouring Hyōgo Prefecture during this period. His second son, Kuniharu, was born in 1920 in Ayabe, but died from illness the same year, along with three-year-old Takemori.

Takeda visited Ueshiba in Ayabe to provide instruction, although he was not a follower of Ōmoto and did not get along with Deguchi, which led to a cooling of the relationship between him and Ueshiba. Ueshiba continued to teach his martial art under the name "Daitō-ryū Aiki-jūjutsu", at the behest of his teacher. However, Deguchi encouraged Ueshiba to create his own style of martial arts, "Ueshiba-ryū", and sent many Ōmoto followers to study at the dojo. He also brought Ueshiba into the highest levels of the group's bureaucracy, making Ueshiba his executive assistant and putting him in charge of the Showa Seinenkai (Ōmoto-kyō's national youth organisation) and the Ōmoto Shobotai, a volunteer fire service.

His close relationship with Deguchi introduced Ueshiba to various members of Japan's far-right; members of the ultranationalist group the Sakurakai would hold meetings at Ueshiba's dojo, and he developed a friendship with the philosopher Shūmei Ōkawa during this period, as well as meeting with Nisshō Inoue and Kozaburō Tachibana. Deguchi also offered Ueshiba's services as a bodyguard to Kingoro Hashimoto, the Sakurakai's founder. Ueshiba's commitment to the goal of world peace, stressed by many biographers, must be viewed in the light of these relationships and his Ōmoto-kyō beliefs. His association with the extreme right-wing is understandable when one considers that Ōmoto-kyō's view of world peace was of a benevolent dictatorship by the Emperor of Japan, with other nations subjugated under Japanese rule.

In 1921, in an event known as the First Ōmoto-kyō Incident (大本事件, Ōmoto jiken), the Japanese authorities raided the compound, destroying the main buildings on the site and arresting Deguchi on charges of lèse-majesté. Ueshiba's dojo was undamaged and, over the following two years, he worked closely with Deguchi to reconstruct the group's centre, becoming heavily involved in farming work and serving as the group's "Caretaker of Forms", a role which placed him in charge of overseeing Ōmoto's move towards self-sufficiency. His son Kisshomaru was born in the summer of 1921.

Three years later, in 1924, Deguchi led a small group of Ōmoto-kyō disciples, including Ueshiba, on a journey to Mongolia at the invitation of retired naval captain Yutaro Yano and his associates within the ultra-nationalist Black Dragon Society. Deguchi's intent was to establish a new religious kingdom in Mongolia, and to this end he had distributed propaganda suggesting that he was the reincarnation of Genghis Khan. Allied with the Mongolian bandit Lu Zhankui, Deguchi's group were arrested in Tongliao by the Chinese authorities. Fortunately for Ueshiba, whilst Lu and his men were executed by firing squad, the Japanese group was released into the custody of the Japanese consul. They were returned under guard to Japan, where Deguchi was imprisoned for breaking the terms of his bail. During this expedition Ueshiba was given the Chinese alias Wang Shou-gao, rendered in Japanese as "Moritaka" – he was reportedly very taken with this name and continued to use it intermittently for the rest of his life.

After returning to Ayabe, Ueshiba began a regimen of spiritual training, regularly retreating to the mountains or performing misogi in the Nachi Falls. As his prowess as a martial artist increased, his fame began to spread. He was challenged by many established martial artists, some of whom later became his students after being defeated by him. In the autumn of 1925 he was asked to give a demonstration of his art in Tokyo, at the behest of Admiral Isamu Takeshita; one of the spectators was Yamamoto Gonnohyōe, who requested that Ueshiba stay in the capital to instruct the Imperial Guard in his martial art. After a couple of weeks, however, Ueshiba took issue with several government officials who voiced concerns about his connections to Deguchi; he cancelled the training and returned to Ayabe.

== Tokyo, 1927–1942 ==
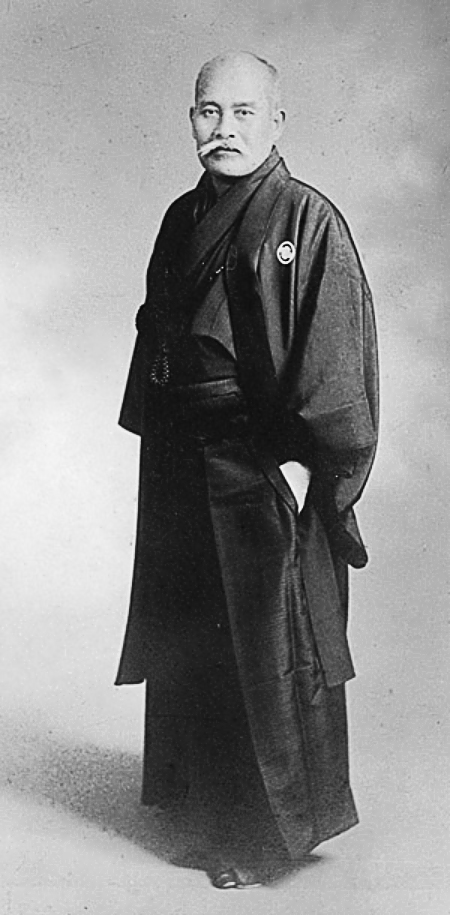
Morihei Ueshiba in 1938

In 1926 Takeshita invited Ueshiba to visit Tokyo again. Ueshiba relented and returned to the capital, but while residing there was stricken with a serious illness. Deguchi visited his ailing student and, concerned for his health, commanded Ueshiba to return to Ayabe. The appeal of returning increased after Ueshiba was questioned by the police following his meeting with Deguchi; the authorities were keeping the Ōmoto-kyō leader under close surveillance. Angered at the treatment he had received, Ueshiba went back to Ayabe again. Six months later, this time with Deguchi's blessing, he and his family moved permanently to Tokyo. This move allowed Ueshiba to teach politicians, high-ranking military personnel, and members of the Imperial household; suddenly he was no longer an obscure provincial martial artist, but a sensei to some of Japan's most important citizens. Arriving in October 1927, the Ueshiba family set up home in the Shirokane district. The building proved too small to house the growing number of aikido students, and so the Ueshibas moved to larger premises, first in Mita district, then in Takanawa, and finally to a purpose-built hall in Shinjuku. This last location, originally named the Kobukan (皇武館), would eventually become the Aikikai Hombu Dojo. During its construction, Ueshiba rented a property nearby, where he was visited by Kanō Jigorō, the founder of judo.

During this period, Ueshiba was invited to teach at a number of military institutes, due to his close personal relationships with key figures in the military (among them Sadao Araki, the Japanese Minister of War). He accepted an invitation from Admiral Sankichi Takahashi to be the martial arts instructor at the Imperial Japanese Naval Academy, and also taught at the Nakano Spy School, although aikido was later judged to be too technical for the students there and karate was adopted instead. He also became a visiting instructor at the Imperial Japanese Army Academy after being challenged by (and defeating) General Makoto Miura, another student of Takeda Sōkaku's Daitō-ryū. Takeda himself met Ueshiba for the last time around 1935, while Ueshiba was teaching at the Osaka headquarters of the Asahi Shimbun newspaper. Frustrated by the appearance of his teacher, who was openly critical of Ueshiba's martial arts and who appeared intent on taking over the classes there, Ueshiba left Osaka during the night, bowing to the residence in which Takeda was staying and thereafter avoiding all contact with him. Between 1940 and 1942 he made several visits to Manchukuo (Japanese occupied Manchuria) where he was the principal martial arts instructor at Kenkoku University. Whilst in Manchuria, he met and defeated the sumo wrestler Tenryū Saburō during a demonstration.

The "Second Ōmoto Incident" in 1935 saw another government crackdown on Deguchi's sect, in which the Ayabe compound was destroyed and most of the group's leaders imprisoned. Although he had relocated to Tokyo, Ueshiba had retained links with the Ōmoto-kyō group (he had in fact helped Deguchi to establish a paramilitary branch of the sect only three years earlier) and expected to be arrested as one of its senior members. However, he had a good relationship with the local police commissioner Kenji Tomita and the chief of police Gīchi Morita, both of whom had been his students. As a result, although he was taken in for interrogation, he was released without charge on Morita's authority.

In 1932, Ueshiba's daughter Matsuko was married to the swordsman Kiyoshi Nakakura, who was adopted as Ueshiba's heir under the name Morihiro Ueshiba. The marriage ended after a few years, and Nakakura left the family in 1937. Ueshiba later designated his son Kisshomaru as the heir to his martial art.

The 1930s saw Japan's invasion of mainland Asia and increased military activity in Europe. Ueshiba was concerned about the prospect of war, and became involved in a number of efforts to try and forestall the conflict that would eventually become World War II. He was part of a group, along with Shūmei Ōkawa and several wealthy Japanese backers, that tried to broker a deal with Harry Chandler to export aviation fuel from the United States to Japan (in contravention of the oil embargo that was currently in force), although this effort ultimately failed. In 1941 Ueshiba also undertook a secret diplomatic mission to China at the behest of Prince Fumimaro Konoe. The intended goal was a meeting with Chiang Kai-shek to establish peace talks, but Ueshiba was unable to meet with the Chinese leader, arriving too late to fulfil his mission.

== Iwama, 1942–1969 ==
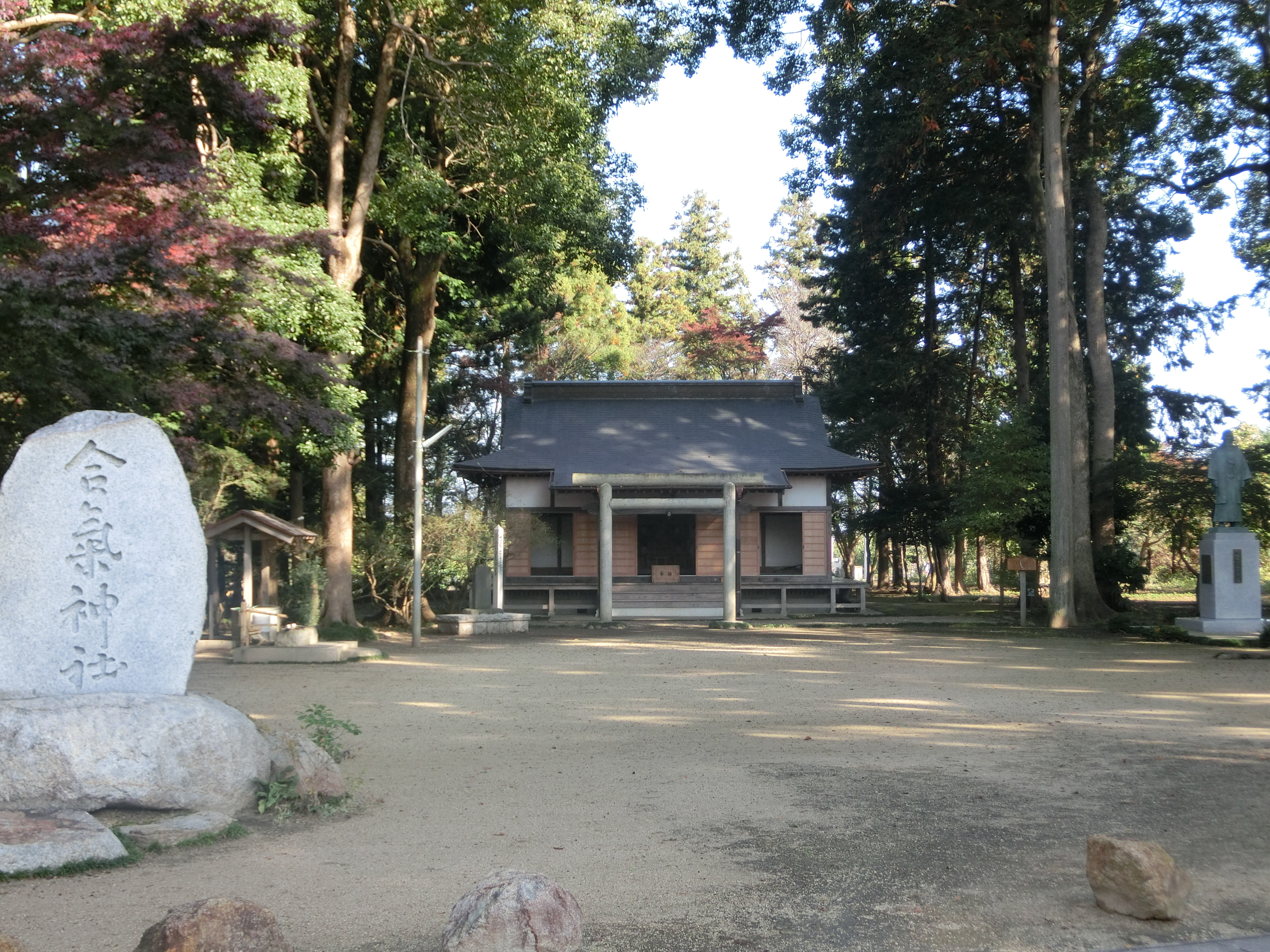
The Aiki Shrine in Iwama

From 1935 onwards, Ueshiba had been purchasing land in Iwama in Ibaraki Prefecture, and by the early 1940s had acquired around 17 acres (6.9 ha; 0.027 sq mi) of farmland there. In 1942, disenchanted with the war-mongering and political manoeuvring in the capital, he left Tokyo and moved to Iwama permanently, settling in a small farmer's cottage. Here he founded the Aiki Shuren Dojo, also known as the Iwama dojo, and the Aiki Shrine, a devotional shrine to the "Great Spirit of Aiki". During this time he travelled extensively in Japan, particularly in the Kansai region, teaching his aikido. Despite the prohibition on the teaching of martial arts after World War II, Ueshiba and his students continued to practice in secret at the Iwama dojo; the Hombu dojo in Tokyo was in any case being used as a refugee centre for citizens displaced by the severe firebombing. It was during this period that Ueshiba met and befriended Koun Nakanishi, an expert in kotodama. The study of kotodama was to become one of Ueshiba's passions in later life, and Nakanishi's work inspired Ueshiba's concept of takemusu aiki.

The rural nature of his new home in Iwama allowed Ueshiba to concentrate on the second great passion of his life: farming. He had been born into a farming family and spent much of his life cultivating the land, from his settlement days in Hokkaido to his work in Ayabe trying to make the Ōmoto-kyō compound self-sufficient. He viewed farming as a logical complement to martial arts; both were physically demanding and required single-minded dedication. Not only did his farming activities provide a useful cover for martial arts training under the government's restrictions, it also provided food for Ueshiba, his students and other local families at a time when food shortages were commonplace.

The government prohibition (on aikido, at least) was lifted in 1948 with the creation of the Aiki Foundation, established by the Japanese Ministry of Education with permission from the Occupation forces. The Hombu dojo re-opened the following year. After the war Ueshiba effectively retired from aikido. He delegated most of the work of running the Hombu dojo and the Aiki Federation to his son Kisshomaru, and instead chose to spend much of his time in prayer, meditation, calligraphy and farming. He still travelled extensively to promote aikido, even visiting Hawaii in 1961. He also appeared in a television documentary on aikido: NTV's The Master of Aikido, broadcast in January 1960. Ueshiba maintained links with the Japanese nationalist movement even in later life; his student Kanshu Sunadomari reported that Ueshiba temporarily sheltered Mikami Taku, one of the naval officers involved in the May 15 Incident, at Iwama.

In 1969, Ueshiba became ill. He led his last training session on March 10, and was taken to hospital where he was diagnosed with cancer of the liver. He died suddenly on April 26, 1969. His remains are interred at Kozan-ji Temple, in the city of Tanabe, Wakayama, where he was born. He was given the posthumous Buddhist title "Aiki-in Moritake En'yū Daidōshi" (合気院盛武円融大道士); parts of his hair were enshrined at Ayabe, Iwama and Kumano. Two months later, his wife Hatsu (植芝 はつ Ueshiba Hatsu, née Itokawa Hatsu; 1881–1969) also died.

== Development of aikido ==
Aikido—usually translated as the Way of Unifying Spirit or the Way of Spiritual Harmony—is a fighting system that focuses on throws, pins, and joint locks together with some striking techniques. It emphasizes protecting the opponent and promotes spiritual and social development.

The technical curriculum of aikido was derived from the teachings of Takeda Sōkaku; the basic techniques of aikido stem from his Daitō-ryū system. In the earlier years of his teaching, from the 1920s to the mid-1930s, Ueshiba taught the Daitō-ryū Aiki-jūjutsu system; his early students' documents bear the term Daitō-ryū. Indeed, Ueshiba trained one of the future highest grade earners in Daitō-ryū, Takuma Hisa, in the art before Takeda took charge of Hisa's training.

The early form of training under Ueshiba was noticeably different from later forms of aikido. It had a larger curriculum, increased use of strikes to vital points (atemi), and greater use of weapons. The schools of aikido developed by Ueshiba's students from the pre-war period tend to reflect the harder style of the early training. These students included Kenji Tomiki (who founded the Shodokan Aikido sometimes called Tomiki-ryū), Noriaki Inoue (who founded Shin'ei Taidō), Minoru Mochizuki (who founded Yoseikan Budo) and Gozo Shioda (who founded Yoshinkan Aikido). Many of these styles are therefore considered "pre-war styles", although some of these teachers continued to train with Ueshiba in the years after World War II.

During his lifetime, Ueshiba had three spiritual experiences that impacted greatly his understanding of the martial arts. The first occurred in 1925, after Ueshiba had defeated a naval officer's bokken (wooden katana) attacks unarmed and without hurting the officer. Ueshiba then walked to his garden, where he had the following realization:

I felt the universe suddenly quake and a golden spirit sprang up from the ground, veiled my body, and changed my body into a golden one. At the same time, my body became light. I was able to understand the whispering of the birds and was aware of the mind of God, the creator of the universe. At that moment I was enlightened: the source of budō [the martial way] is God's love – the spirit of loving protection for all beings ... Budō is not the felling of an opponent by force; nor is it a tool to lead the world to destruction with arms. True Budō is to accept the spirit of the universe, keep the peace of the world, correctly produce, protect and cultivate all beings in nature.

His second experience occurred in 1940 when engaged in the ritual purification process of misogi.

Around 2 a.m., I suddenly forgot all the martial techniques I had ever learned. The techniques of my teachers appeared completely new. Now they were vehicles for the cultivation of life, knowledge, and virtue, not devices to throw people with.

His third experience was in 1942 during the worst fighting of World War II when Ueshiba had a vision of the "Great Spirit of Peace".

The Way of the Warrior has been misunderstood. It is not a means to kill and destroy others. Those who seek to compete and better one another are making a terrible mistake. To smash, injure, or destroy is the worst thing a human being can do. The real Way of a Warrior is to prevent such slaughter – it is the Art of Peace, the power of love.

After these events, Ueshiba seemed to slowly grow away from Takeda, and he began to change his art. These changes are reflected in the differing names with which he referred to his system, first as aiki-jūjutsu, then Ueshiba-ryū, Asahi-ryū, and aiki budō. In 1942, when Ueshiba's group joined the Dai Nippon Butoku Kai, the martial art that he developed finally came to be known as aikido.

As Ueshiba grew older, more skilled, and more spiritual in his outlook, his art also changed and became softer and more gentle. Martial techniques became less important, and more focus was given to the control of ki. In his expression of the art there was a greater emphasis on what is referred to as kokyū-nage, or "breath throws" which are soft and blending, utilizing the opponent's movement to throw them. Ueshiba regularly practiced cold water misogi, as well as other spiritual and religious rites, and viewed his studies of aikido as part of this spiritual training.

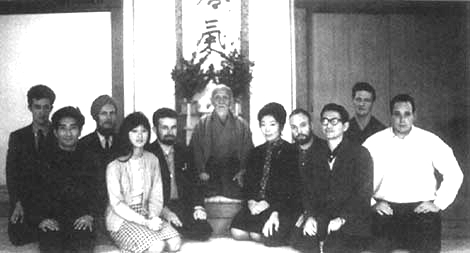
Ueshiba with a group of his international students at the Hombu dojo in 1967.

Over the years, Ueshiba trained a large number of students, many of whom later became famous teachers in their own right and developed their styles of aikido. Some of them were uchi-deshi, live-in students. Ueshiba placed many demands on his uchi-deshi, expecting them to attend to him at all times, act as training partners (even in the middle of the night), arrange his travel plans, massage, and bathe him, and assist with household chores.

There were roughly four generations of students, comprising the pre-war students (training c.1921–1935), students who trained during the Second World War (c.1936–1945), the post-war students in Iwama (c.1946–1955) and the students who trained with Ueshiba during his final years (c.1956–c.1969). As a result of Ueshiba's martial development throughout his life, students from each of these generations tend to have markedly different approaches to aikido. These variations are compounded by the fact that few students trained with Ueshiba for a protracted period; only Yoichiro Inoue, Kenji Tomiki, Gozo Shioda, Morihiro Saito, Tsutomu Yukawa and Mitsugi Saotome studied directly under Ueshiba for more than five or six years. After the war, Ueshiba and the Hombu Dojo dispatched some of their students to various other countries, resulting in aikido spreading around the world.

After Ueshiba's death, tensions grew between the Aikikai and Koichi Tohei, who had been chief instructor of the Hombu Dojo and had founded the Ki no Kenkyukai in 1971 to teach his ki principles outside it. Tohei resigned from the Aikikai in May 1974 and continued teaching through his own organization, the Ki Society.

== Honors ==
- Medal of Honor (Purple Ribbon) (Japan), 1960
- Order of the Rising Sun, Gold Rays with Rosette, 1964
- Order of the Sacred Treasure (Japan), 1968

== Works ==
- Morihei Ueshiba, The Heart of Aikido: The Philosophy of Takemusu Aiki (2010), Kodansha International, ISBN 978-4-7700-3114-3
- Morihei Ueshiba, The Secret Teachings of Aikido (2008), Kodansha International, ISBN 978-4-7700-3030-6
- Morihei Ueshiba, The Essence of Aikido: Spiritual Teachings of Morihei Ueshiba (1994), Kodansha International, ISBN 978-4-7700-1727-7
- Morihei Ueshiba, The Art of Peace: Teachings of the Founder of Aikido (1992), Shambhala, ISBN 978-0-8777-3851-0
- Morihei Ueshiba, Budo: Teachings of the Founder of Aikido (1991), Kodansha International, ISBN 978-4-7700-1532-7
