= Ōsensei =

Ōsensei (大先生/翁先生, great teacher, grand master) is a Japanese term, a stronger form of sensei (先生, teacher).

Ōsensei may also refer to:

- Morihei Ueshiba (1883–1969), founder of Aikido
- Masutatsu Oyama (1923–1994), founder of Kyokushinkai karate
- O-Sensei, a fictional character in the DC Universe
