= Sanmu incident =

1961 attempted coup d'état in Japan

- Part of the Cold War
- Date: December 12, 1961
- Goals: Assassination of Japanese Prime Minister Hayato Ikeda and his cabinet ministers; Overthrow of the Japanese government; Seizure of the National Diet; Prevention of Japan falling to communism
- Result: Coup attempt foiled All conspirators arrested

Parties
Former Imperial Japanese Army and Navy personnel	National Police Agency

Lead figures
Tokutaro Sakurai	Hayato Ikeda

Casualties
- Arrested: 13

The Sanmu incident (三無事件, San mu jiken) was an attempted coup d'état in Japan that was foiled on December 12, 1961. During the raid undertaken by the National Police Agency, 13 conspirators were arrested. It was the first coup attempt in post-war Japan. The only other attempt in this period, led by Yukio Mishima, would follow in 1970. The Sanmu Jiken was originally called the Sanyū Jiken in Japan, and is still sometimes referred to as such.

== Incident ==
The stated goals of the group were to kill Prime Minister Hayato Ikeda, his Cabinet, and take control of the National Diet. They hoped that this would prevent Japan from succumbing to a communist revolution. At the time of the arrest, the conspirators had already come into possession of uniforms and deadly weaponry, such as grenades and rifles.

Amongst the members were officers of the former Imperial Japanese Army, such as Major General Tokutaro Sakurai. Also involved were businessman Toyosaku Kawanami and former Manchukuo minister of economic affairs Han Yunjie. Another participant was Mikami Taku, a former Navy Lieutenant. He had previously been involved in a pre-war coup attempt in 1932, known as the May 15 incident, for which he was then imprisoned.

== See also ==
- List of coups and coup attempts
- Shimanaka incident

== Sources ==
- Yamamoto, Mitsunobu (2017). 私の中の三島由紀夫 [Yukio Mishima in Me] (in Japanese). Hakurosha. ISBN 978-4-434-23098-1.
