= Kōzaburō =

- Gender: Male

Origin
- Origin: Japanese
- Meaning: Different meanings depending on the kanji used

Kōzaburō, Kozaburo or Kouzaburou (written: 康三郎, 孝三郎 or 公三郎) is a masculine Japanese given name. Notable people with the name include:

- Kozaburo Hirai (平井 康三郎; 1910–2002), Japanese composer
- Kōzaburō Tachibana (橘 孝三郎; 1893–1974), Japanese activist and ultranationalist
- Tamamura Kōzaburō (玉村 康三郎; 1856–?), Japanese photographer
- Kōzaburō Yoshimura (吉村 公三郎; 1911–2000), Japanese film director

== See also ==
- Kosaburo
