= Tokutaro Sakurai =

Japanese general (1897–1980)

Tokutarō Sakurai
- 桜井徳太郎
- Born: 21 June 1897; Fukuoka Prefecture, Japan
- Died: 28 December 1980 (aged 83)
- Military career
- Allegiance: Empire of Japan
- Branch: Imperial Japanese Army
- Service years: 1918–1945
- Rank: Major General
- Conflicts: Second Sino-Japanese War; World War II

Tokutarō Sakurai (桜井徳太郎, Sakurai Tokutarō; 21 June 1897 – 28 December 1980) was a major general in the Imperial Japanese Army, commanding Japanese ground forces in Burma during World War II.

== Biography ==
Sakurai was born in Fukuoka as the eldest son of a former samurai retainer of Fukuoka Domain who had become an elementary school principal. He attended military preparatory schools in Kumamoto and Tokyo, and graduated from the 30th class of the Imperial Japanese Army Academy in May 1918. He served as a junior officer with the IJA 36th Infantry Regiment, and graduated from the 37th class of the Army Staff College in November 1925.

Sakurai while serving in the 24th Infantry Regiment

He had an active early career, serving as an instructor at the Army Toyama School, as a military advisor to the National Revolutionary Army in Beijing, on the staff of the IJA 10th Division, on the staff of the IJA 8th Combined Brigade, battalion commander on the IJA 24th Infantry Regiment, instructor at the Army Infantry School, and on the staff of the China Expeditionary Army and the staff of then the IJA 1st Army. In July 1938, with the opening of the Army's Nakano School, the Army's primary training center for military intelligence operations and unconventional warfare, Sakurai was picked as an instructor. By this time, he already had a reputation of eccentric manners and ruthless, unscrupulous behavior.

Sakurai was promoted to colonel in August 1939. During the Second Sino-Japanese War, he was a member of the Japanese negotiating team on the Hebei–Chahar Political Council. He was assigned to the headquarters of the China Expeditionary Army. Sakurai was subsequently appointed chief of staff of the IJA 34th Division, which was at the Battle of Zaoyang–Yichang in 1940. In 1941, he served as an instructor at the Military Police School, and in 1942 was appointed commander of the IJA 65th Infantry Regiment based in Hubei. In August 1943, he was promoted to major general.

Subsequently, as commander of the Infantry Group of the IJA 55th Division, Sakurai was assigned to the Japanese Burma Area Army and served as military advisor to the Burma National Army. He was the main Japanese commander at the Battle of the Admin Box in February 1944. After his return to Japan in April 1945, he was appointed commander of the IJA 212th Division, one of the new divisions raised to contest Operation Coronet, the projected American invasion of Japan, and was based near his native Fukuoka at the time of the surrender of Japan.

In December 1961, Sakurai was arrested in the Sanmu incident for illegal possession of firearms and swords. However, he was released due to insufficient evidence. In June 1966, Sakurai took the tonsure, becoming a Buddhist priest. He lived at the temple of Rurikō-ji in Yamaguchi until his death in 1980.
