= Noriaki Inoue =

Japanese martial artist

Noriaki Inoue (井上 鑑昭, Inoue Noriaki; 1902-12-03, Tanabe – 1994-04-13, Kunitachi) was a Japanese martial artist, who was in his early years closely associated with the spiritual and technical development of aikido along with his uncle Morihei Ueshiba. Inoue is the founder of Shinwa Taidō, a martial art which he later renamed to Shin'ei Taidō.

He was the fourth child of Zenso Inoue, the patriarch of the wealthy Inoue family of Tanabe, and of Tame Ueshiba, the eldest sister of Morihei. Much of Noriaki's childhood was spent in the company of Ueshiba. He joined his uncle at Shirataki in a settlement expedition in the north of the island of Hokkaidō (1912–1919) and studied the Daito-ryu Aiki-Jutsu with him under Sokaku Takeda. He was also closely associated with the discovery by Ueshiba of the Omoto sect in Ayabe and his encounter with its spiritual leader Onisaburo Deguchi which had a decisive influence in Ueshiba's later philosophy.

Inoue then actively collaborated with his uncle into the spreading of aikibudō, the art derived from the daitō-ryū that Ueshiba has perfected. In 1927, the two men settled in Tokyo, teaching at various locations until the construction in 1931 of Ueshiba's first permanent dojo, the Kobukan. However, after the second Omoto incident (1935) when the military government suppressed the Omoto sect, a breach developed between Ueshiba and his nephew, the latter accusing the former of betraying the cause of the sect by not sharing the fate of its leaders, and the two eventually parted ways with mutual resentment. After the war, Inoue continued to teach in Tokyo independently from Ueshiba, instructing US Air Force officers.

While the original aikibudō has now evolved into aikido under Ueshiba, Inoue kept teaching his art as such until 1956 when he changed its name into Shinwa Taidō and finally Shin'ei Taidō. He had little interaction with the Aikikai organization which followed the death of Ueshiba and continued teaching actively until his death. He considered himself a co-founder of aikido along with Ueshiba although that is disputed by the Ueshiba family.

Inoue used various names throughout his life: Kitamatsumaru (1902), Yoichiro (1909), Yoshiharu (1920), Seisho (1940), Hoken (1948), Teruyoshi (1971), and finally Noriaki (1973).
