= Kosaburo =

- Gender: Male

Origin
- Origin: Japanese
- Meaning: Different meanings depending on the kanji used

Kosaburo, Kōsaburō or Kousaburou (written: 攻三郎, 恒三郎 or こうさぶろう in hiragana) is a masculine Japanese given name. Notable people with the name include:

- Kosaburo Hashiguchi (橋口 攻三郎), Japanese mathematician
- Kosaburo Nishime (西銘 恒三郎; born 1954), Japanese politician

Kosaburō or Kosaburou (written: 小三郎 or こさぶろう in hiragana) is a separate given name, though it may be romanized the same way. Notable people with the name include:

- Kosaburo Eto (江藤 小三郎; 1946–1969), Japanese anti-communist and activist

== See also ==
- Kōzaburō
