= Hozumi Yatsuka =

Japanese scholar and lawyer

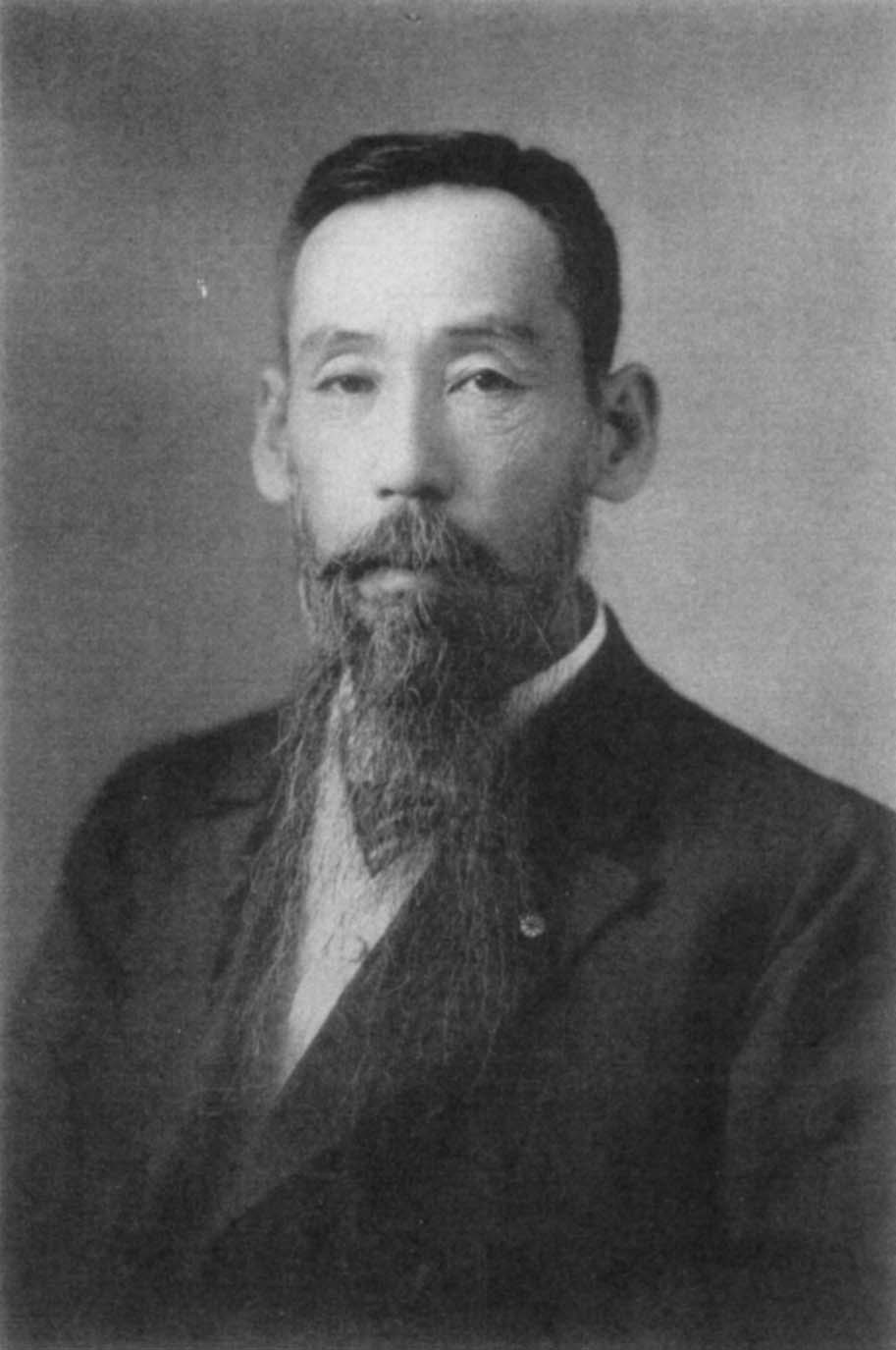
- Hozumi in 1912
- Born: March 20, 1860; Ehime Prefecture, Japan
- Died: 1912 (aged 51–52)
- Occupation: Legal Scholar
- Known for: One of the first Japanese scholars to crystallise counter-revolutionary state Shintoism.

Academic background
- Education: Tokyo Imperial University (1882)
- Influences: Jean Bodin, Robert Filmer, Paul de Lagarde, Confucius, Shintoism

Academic work
- Discipline: Legal Scholarship
- Sub-discipline: Constitutional Law, Japanese Law, Political Theology
- School or tradition: Conservatism (1879-1883), State Shintoism (1883-1912), Volkism (1883-1912), Absolutism (1883-1912)
- Notable ideas: Kokutai, Seitai, Kodoshin, Godo Seizon, Chuko
- Influenced: Kimura Takataro, Inoue Tetsujiro, Takayama Chogyu, Minobe Tastukichi, State Shintoism

Hozumi Yatsuka (穂積 八束; March 20, 1860 – October 5, 1912) was a Japanese scholar and lawyer. He was active in characterising the legal systems of the Japanese state, and his writings especially focused on the Meiji Constitution.

== Education ==
Hozumi entered University of Tokyo at the age of nineteen after studying English for six years because many professors were foreigners who lectured in their own language. In 1883 after his graduation he entered the graduate school to continue his studies of political science. In August 1884 he went to Germany to study European institutional history and constitutional law. During his stay in Germany he studied at three universities: Heidelberg, Berlin and Strasbourg. In Strasbourg he studied under Paul Laband whose influence on Hozumi was profound. Laband was the foremost German representative of the school of legal positivism. In this usage positivism means an exclusive preoccupation with positive law, the law actually promulgated by a competent lawgiver. The central concept of Laband's theory was that of the legal personality of the state. He grounded sovereignty in this legal personality above and apart from its constituent members.

== Legal scholar in Japan ==
In 1889 Hozumi returned to Japan and gradually shifted away from legal positivism, but he did not reject his positivist heritage outright. Within a very few years after his return, attacks from the left together with issues of interpretation of the Meiji constitution led him to seek in ancestor worship and the family state concept the true source of Japan's greatness.

In his analysis of the state, Hozumi speaks of kokutai (national body/structure) and seitai (government body/structure). Hozumi defines kokutai anew. He gives kokutai a specific legal meaning without stripping it of its historical and ethical connotations. For Hozumi kokutai refers to the locus of sovereignty. Two forms of kokutai are important: monarchy and democracy. In a monarchy the locus of sovereignty lies in the monarch and in a democracy in the people.

And the form of kokutai is also important for the kind of constitution a country has. He distinguishes two kinds, the authorized constitution and the national contract constitution. Authorized constitutions are ordained by a sovereign at his own will, while national contract constitutions arise from an agreement among sovereign individuals.

The term seitai is used by Hozumi to denote the specific governmental organization under a given kokutai. An important distinction is the difference between a despotic seitai and a constitutional seitai. A despotic seitai contains all powers in an undivided form while a constitutional seitai is characterized by the division of powers.

Hozumi rejects the monogenic idea of human development, postulating that different races of humanity arose and developed in isolation enabling them to form idiosyncratic modes of governance/culture. Thus, ethnic groups are formed from the political and moral unity of groups of people under one sovereign, who becomes the symbol of ultimate moral and political authority, i.e. the one common ancestor of a group. As a result, Hozumi argues that humans, by nature, form societies that revolve around an unquestioning loyalty (kodoshin) to their sovereign and one in which individuals and society are dissolved into each other--a state summed up by the concept of godo seizon or amalgamated existence. This is what he considered to be the hierarchical, monarchist form of kokutai.

However, Hozumi believes that this harmonious state of things was, in most places, shattered by the introduction of universalist belief systems, e.g. Buddhism, Christianity, and Confucianism, which exalted the concept of the individual as being independent of the state and instead related to a transcendental universal entity. Hence, these universalist beliefs led to the breakdown of the primordial social orders and separate law from morality. This phenomenon would lead to the formation of more egalitarian kokutai where total obedience to the state was no longer seen as second nature.

For Hozumi, Japan's greatness stems from its adherence to the primordial form of kokutai epitomised by what he considered to be the eternal dynastic rule of Amaterasu Okami and her subsequent reincarnations as the successive emperors of Japan. Thus, the emperor was the sovereign and the father of the people whose authority was sacred and inerrant.

In his view, democracy is characteristic of European kokutai, but the Japanese kokutai is monarchical and so the Meiji Constitution is an authorized constitution.

== Legacy ==
Hozumi is the first who gives kokutai its legal meaning and links this with the family idea. His ideas about the Meiji constitution differ from the thoughts of drafter Itō Hirobumi but his writings on the constitution are written within the framework of the Meiji constitution. Hozumi died in 1912 but his ideas about the Japanese state and the Meiji constitution remained the standard interpretation till 1945.
