= Kanshu Sunadomari =

Japanese aikidoka

Kanshū Sunadomari (Kanji: 砂泊 諴秀 Hiragana: すなどまり かんしゅう 1923 – November 13, 2010) was a Japanese aikido teacher who was an uchideshi to the founder of aikido, Morihei Ueshiba. He founded the aikido style Manseikan Aikido.

== Biography ==
Sunadomari was born on the island of Kikaijima in Kagoshima Prefecture, Japan and in his teens became an uchideshi of Morihei Ueshiba, the founder of aikido. His live-in apprenticeship under the founder took place during World War II, and he also spent a brief period at the Aikikai Hombu Dojo after the war. On October 23, 1953 he gave the first public demonstration of aikido in Kyūshū. The following January he opened up the Manseikan dojo (万生館) on the premises of the Tettori Shrine (手取神社) in the heart of Kumamoto City. His aikido spread throughout Kyūshū to cities such as Fukuoka, Kagoshima, Nagasaki, and Miyazaki. During this time, the number of practitioners rose to over 20,000 with over 3,000 people reaching the level of black belt.

In 1961, at the age of 38, Sunadomari received the rank of 9th [dan]. Sunadomari dedicated himself to the teaching of aikido in Kyūshū while based in Kumamoto.

Sunadomari comes from a family of devout believers in Ōmoto, the religion on which Ueshiba based the spiritual underpinnings of aikido, and the Sunadomari family maintained a close relationship with the founder until his death. Kanemoto Sunadomari (elder brother of Kanshu) studied under the founder in the early 1930s and published the first biography of the Founder in 1969 entitled Aikido Kaiso Morihei Ueshiba. A newer version of this book was later published under the title Bu no Shinjin. Fukiko (Mitsue) Sunadomari (elder sister of Kanshu) was a close personal confidante of the founder until his death and was also a high ranking practitioner of aikido.

After Ueshiba's death in 1969, Sunadomari founded his own independent style in Kumamoto City and began his further study of the spirit of aikido. In 1999, he renamed his style Aiki Manseido (合氣万生道) symbolizing his conviction to help spread world peace by transmitting the spirit of the founder across the world through physical technique. The "do" in Manseido is the same as in Aikido, referring to "the way", rather than the "kan" in Manseikan that can be translated as mansion or castle. Manseido translates as "the way of giving life to all things" or "the way for all people." On January 11, 2008, Sunadomari chose to return to using the name Manseikan Aikido (万生館合氣道) to pay homage to the Founder and to re-emphasize his organization's dedication to the study and manifestation of the Founder's philosophy.

Practitioners of his style recite the Spirit of Aikido (合氣道の精神) before beginning each practice : "Aiki is Love... it is through the spirit of protective love for all things that we perfect our life's mission... ". Practice in Manseikan Aikido consists of a set of flowing warm-up exercises (準備運動), a number of paired movements that train both body movement (taisabaki, 体裁き) and breath-power(呼吸力), practice of basic technique (kihon waza, 基本技), as well as paired warm-down exercises (sei no undo, 背の運動). Training is further supplemented with practice using the wooden sword (bokken,木剣) and staff (jō ,杖). Sunadomari is known for his emphasis on kokyu ryoku (breath power; 呼吸力) and his extremely soft and powerful technique. He is widely acclaimed for his dynamic performance in the First Friendship Demonstration which was held in Tokyo in 1985 and became one of the most famous modern aikido demonstrations captured on film. He has written several books, most of which have never been translated from their original Japanese. In 2004, his book Enlightenment through Aikido (Aikido de Satoru, 合気道で悟る) became the first to be released in English translation.

== Translated works ==
- Enlightenment Through Aikido (2004) - ISBN 1-55643-487-1, translation by Dennis Clark based on the 2002 book Aikido de Satoru
