= Tsutomu Yukawa =

Japanese aikidoka

Tsutomu Yukawa (Japanese: 湯川勉; 1911–1942) was a Japanese aikidoka.

Born in Gobo in Wakayama prefecture, Yukawa began his martial arts training in judo, studying under Tesshin Hoshi. In 1931 he travelled to Tokyo to study at the Kodokan, but whilst in the city he encountered aikido's founder, Morihei Ueshiba, and was soundly defeated. He then took up the study of aikido. While a student at the Kobukan, Yukawa was known for his physical strength, earning the nickname the "Kobukan Samson". He was strong enough to clap two sacks of rice together and bend iron nails with his hands. Yukawa was one of only a handful of students to study with Ueshiba for more than five years. A favourite student of Ueshiba, he once carried Ueshiba's son Kisshomaru to hospital on his back, and he also married the founder's niece in 1934.

He died from stab wounds sustained during a fight with a soldier in Osaka. According to Stanley Pranin, based on interviews with the Ueshiba family, Yukawa, then a soldier himself, was attempting to leave a bar brawl, and as he descended the stairs, was stabbed from behind by a soldier with a bayonet. Pranin stated that this is a very painful incident for the Yukawa and Ueshiba family, as Yukawa was much loved, and he was not in a "fight"; he was murdered.
