= Rurikō-ji =

Temple and park in Yamaguchi city, Japan

- 瑠璃光寺
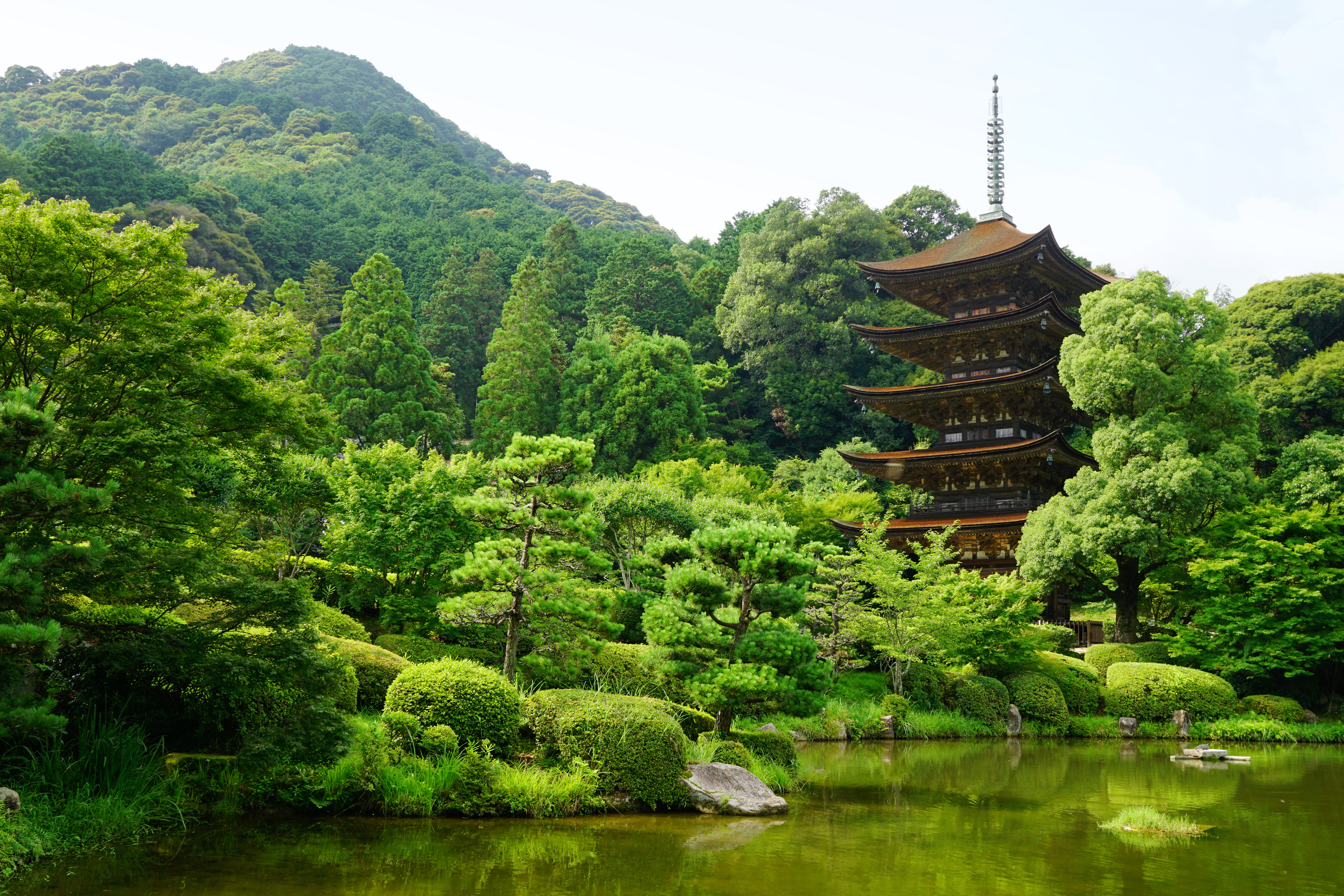
- Rurikō-ji Pagoda

- Location within Yamaguchi Prefecture Location within Japan

Religion
- Affiliation: Buddhist
- Deity: Yakushi Nyorai
- Rite: Sōtō
- Status: functional

Location
- Location: 7-1 Kayama-cho, Yamaguchi-shi, Yamaguchi-ken 781-7108
- Country: Japan
- Interactive map of Rurikō-ji
- Coordinates: 34°11′24.65″N 131°28′22.5″E

Architecture
- Completed: 1471
- National Treasure of Japan
- National Historic Site of Japan

Rurikō-ji (瑠璃光寺) is a Buddhist temple located in the Kozan neighborhood of the city of Yamaguchi, Yamaguchi Prefecture, Japan. The temple belongs to the Sōtō school of Japanese Zen sect and its honzon is a statue of Yakushi Nyorai. The temple's full name is Honeizan Rurikōzen-ji (保寧山瑠璃光禪寺). It is noted for its Muromachi period Five-story Pagoda which is designated a National Treasure.

== History ==
=== Kōshaku-ji ===
Initially, this location was the site of a temple called Kōshaku-ji, built by order of Ōuchi Yoshihiro (1356-1399), the 25th chieftain of the Ōuchi clan. Yoshihiro died in battle against the forces of Shogun Ashikaga Yoshimitsu and his younger brother, Ōuchi Moriakira, ordered the construction of a pagoda in his memory. However, Ōuchi Moriakira died in battles against the Shoni and Ōtomo clans in Kyushu in 1431, and the pagoda was not completed until 1442. After the fall of the Ōuchi clan, the victorious Mōri clan ordered that the Main Hall of the temple be dismantled and relocated at their stronghold of Hiroshima in Aki Province. This structure, which was competed in 1540 still exists as the Hondo of Fudo-in temple in Hiroshima and is a designated National Treasure.

=== Niho Rurikō-ji ===
Rurikō-ji was originally located in the area that currently corresponds to the Niho district of the city of Yamaguchi. It was built in memory of Sue Hirofusa, seventh leader of the Sue clan, in 1471 and was originally called Anyo-ji. It was renamed Ruriko-ji in 1492. In 1600, Mōri Terumoto was defeated in the Battle of Sekigahara and the victorious Tokugawa shogunate deprived him of most of his territories, including Aki Province. Making Hagi his new seat, he transferred Kōshaku-ji to Hagi in 1604. Rurikō-ji was transferred to the former site of Kōshaku-ji in 1690, where it also assumed the original name of the temple.

== Pagoda ==
The Rurikō-ji pagoda is the tenth oldest of the five-story pagodas in all of Japan, and one of the most prominent structures from the mid-Muromachi period to survive to the present day. At 31.2 meters high, the pagoda is characterized by the use of a cornice only on the second story. The roofs have hinoki cypress bark shingles rather than roof tiles. Some parts of the building are in the zenshūyo, with Chinese influence, including the inverted lotus-shaped ornaments on the railing of the first floor. The circular altar on the lower floor, contains statues of image of Amida Nyorai and Ōuchi Yoshihiro.

== Other notable buildings ==
- Temple Museum: Displays models and documents related to the pagoda, as well as models of the 55 major five-story pagodas from different regions of Japan.
- Chinryūtei: building where secret meetings were held between representatives of the Chōshū and Satsuma Domains, the latter headed by Komatsu Kiyokado and Saigō Takamori to form the Satchō Alliance that would lead to the overthrow of the Tokugawa shogunate in 1868.
- Rozandō: Mōri Takachika's tea ceremony room, which he moved when he moved his stronghold from Hagi. It was also the scene of clandestine meetings that would help hatch the uprising against the shogunate.

== Mori clan cemetery ==
The Kōzan Cemetery at Rurikō-ji contains the tombs of the last leaders of the Mōri clan. Along with Tenshu-in, Daishō-in and Tōkō-ji cemeteries in Hagi, it is part of the Hagi Domain Mōri Clan Cemetery National Historic Site. In the cemetery are the 13th daimyō Mōri Takachika and his wife, his heir Mototoku and his wife, his son Motoaki and his wife, a total of seven tombs of successive generations of the Mōri family, and other graves.

The temple is located approximately 30 minutes from Yamaguchi Station on the JR West San'yo Main Line.

== Gallery ==
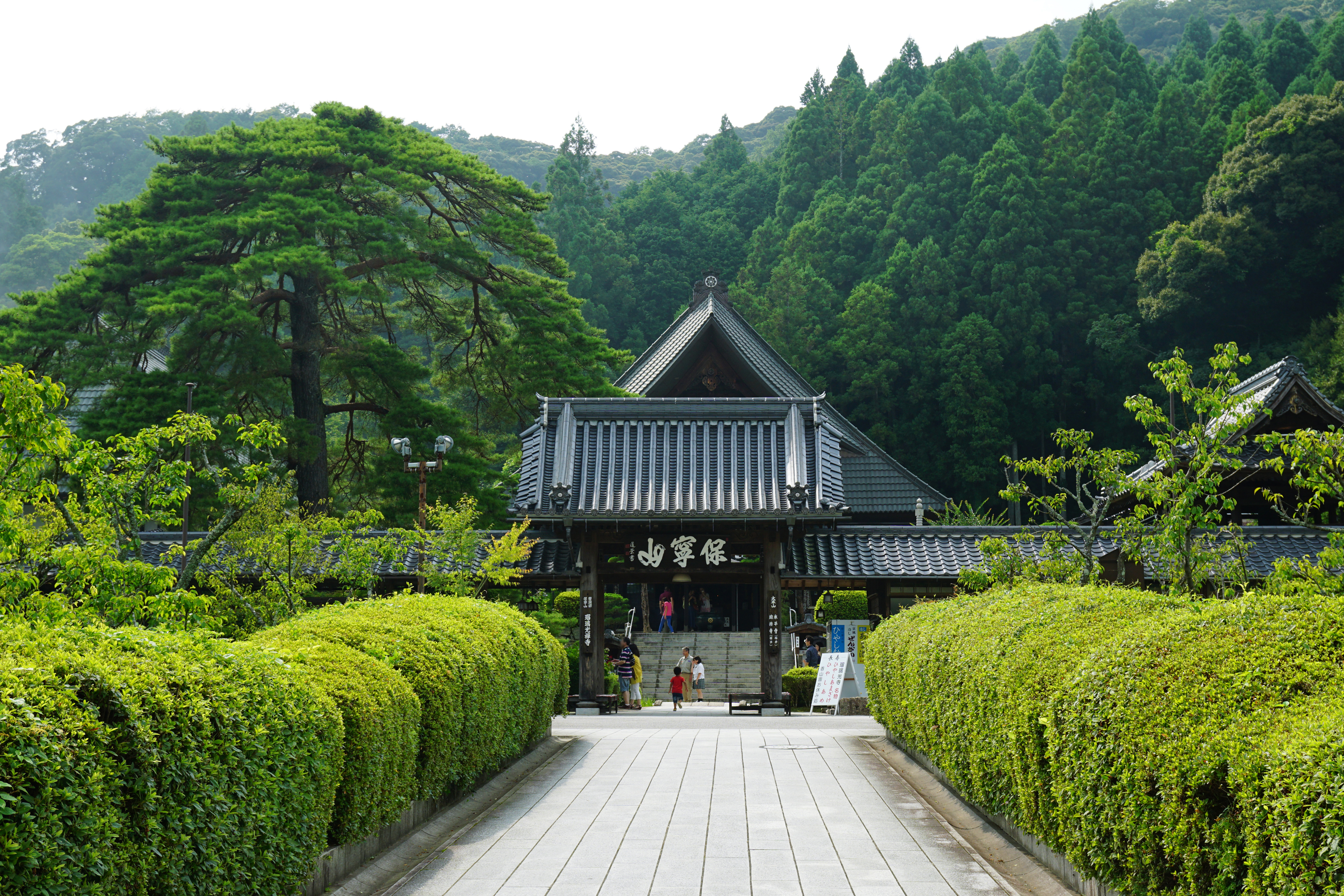
Approach

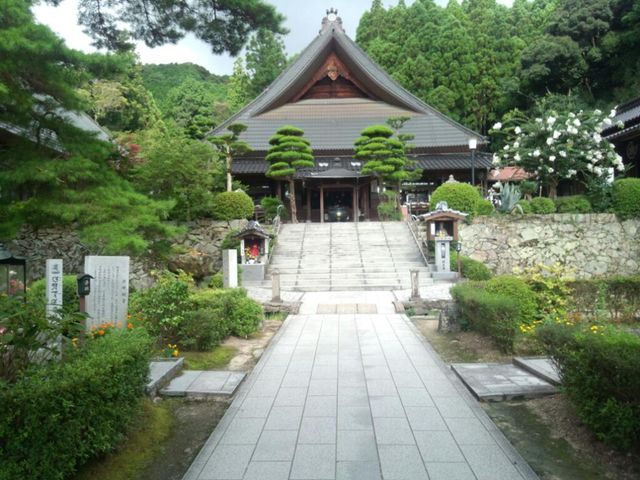
Main Hall

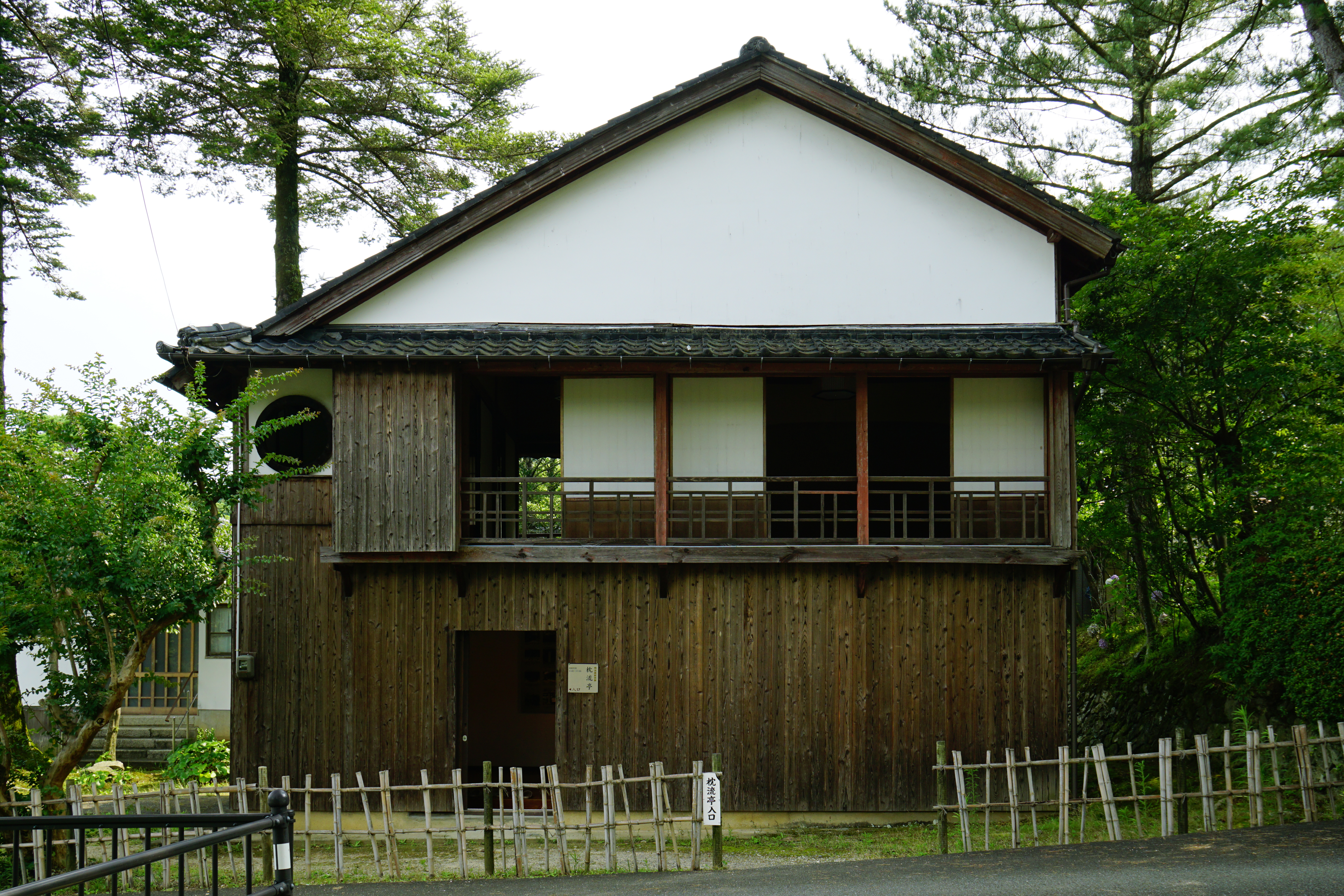
Chinryūtei

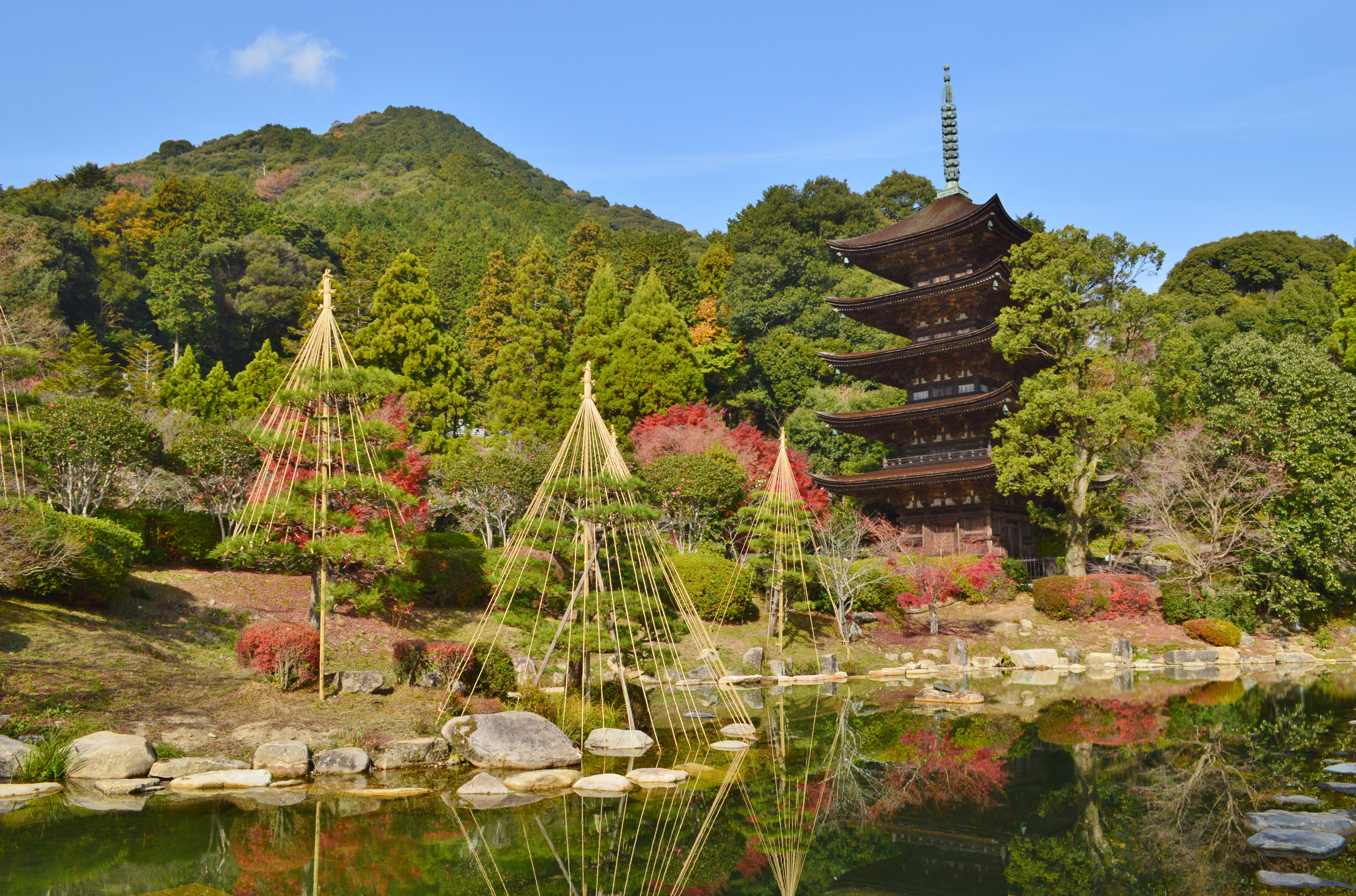

== See also ==
- List of Historic Sites of Japan (Yamaguchi)
- List of National Treasures of Japan (temples)
