= Kokutai =

Japanese political concept

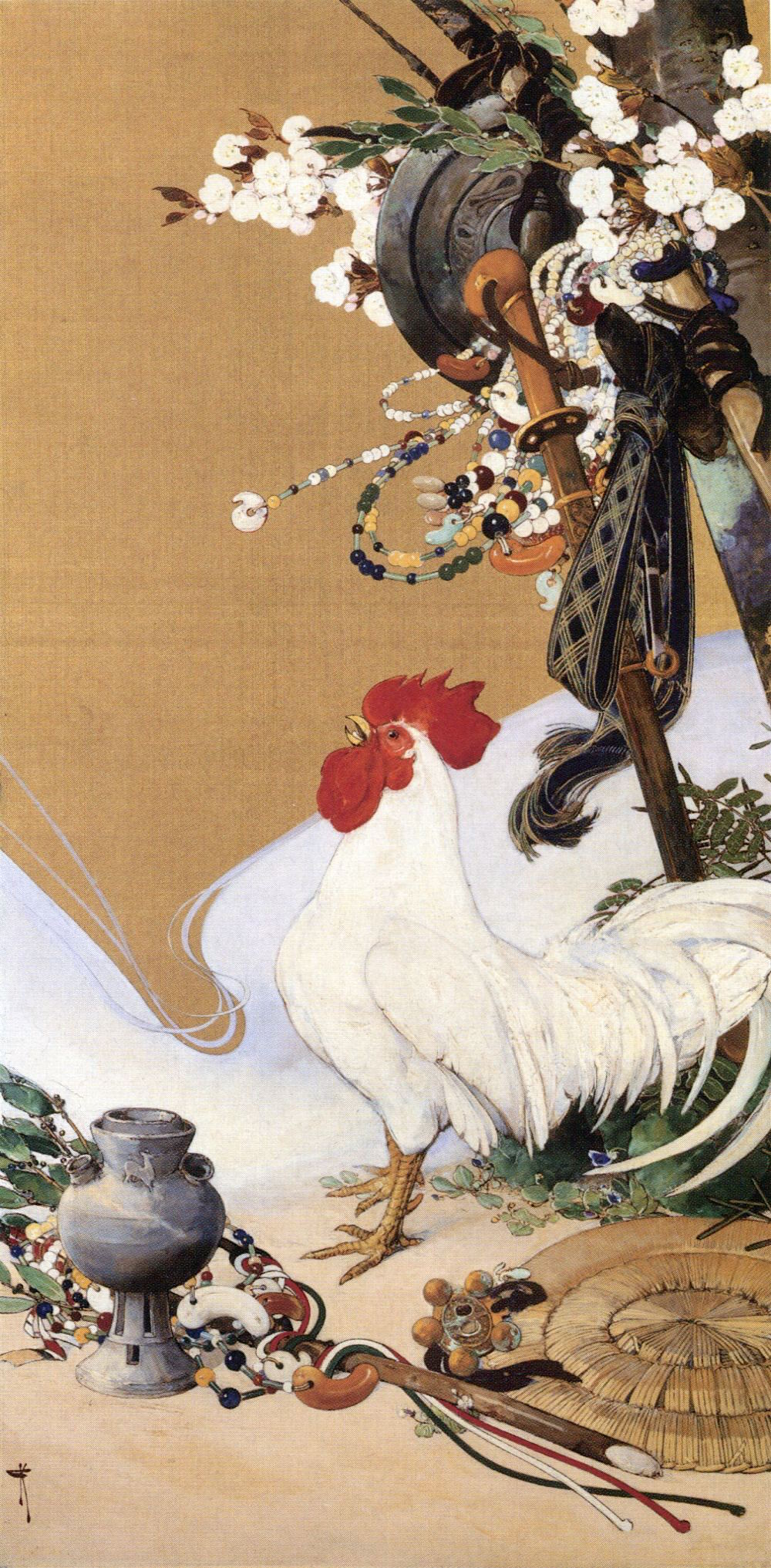
The nationalistic essence of kokutai is thought of as the uniqueness of the Japanese polity as issuing from a leader of divine origin. (Note: In the illustration is the "Tokoyo no Naganakidori" (常世之長鳴鳥), a long-singing cockerel from the Everlasting Land which appears in the Kojiki as the herald of Amaterasu.)

Kokutai (国体; "national body/structure of state") is a concept in the Japanese language translatable as "system of government", "sovereignty", "national identity, essence and character", "national polity; body politic; national entity; basis for the Emperor's sovereignty; Japanese constitution" or nation.

== Etymology ==
Kokutai originated as a Sino-Japanese loanword from Chinese guoti (Chinese: 國體; pinyin: guótǐ; "state political system; national governmental structure"). The Japanese compound word joins koku (國; "country; nation; province; land") and tai (體; "body; substance; object; structure; form; style"). According to the Hanyu Da Cidian, the oldest guoti usages are in two Chinese classic texts. The 2nd century BC Guliang zhuan (榖梁傳; 'Guliang's Commentary') to the Spring and Autumn Annals glosses dafu (大夫; 'high minister', 'senior official') as guoti metaphorically meaning "embodiment of the country". The 1st century AD Book of Han history of Emperor Cheng of Han used guoti to mean "laws and governance" of Confucianist officials.

== Before 1868 ==
The historical origins of kokutai go back to the Edo period ruled by the Tokugawa shogunate (1603–1868), especially to writings associated with Mitogaku ("Mito School").

Aizawa Seishisai (1782–1863) was an authority on Neo-Confucianism and leader of the Mitogaku tradition who supported direct restoration of the Imperial House of Japan. He popularized the word kokutai in his 1825 Shinron (新論 "New Theses"), a collection of essays which also introduced the term Sonnō jōi ("revere the Emperor, expel the barbarians").

Aizawa developed his ideas of kokutai treating the Japanese national myths in the Kojiki and Nihon Shoki as historical facts, including that the Emperor was directly descended from the sun goddess Amaterasu-ōmikami. Aizawa used this divinely-ruled ancient Japan to justify a polity in which religious and political authority were united in the form of saisei itchi (祭政一致 "unity of religion and government") or theocracy.

The intellectual context for Aizawa's thought combined kokugaku (nativist movement) with Neo-Confucian political theory. Mitogaku scholars synthesized native mythic sources and Confucian ideas to present a distinctive claim for Japan's political uniqueness. Aizawa also argued that Christianity and other Western influences threatened Japan's social order and recommended strengthening a unified state religion and moral education as defense against foreign subversion.

Scholars note that for many early Neo-Confucian and Mitogaku thinkers the meaning of kokutai remained imprecise and contestable. As linguist Roy Andrew Miller put it, for early thinkers, "kokutai meant something still rather vague and ill defined. It was more or less the Japanese 'nation's body' or 'national structure'." Nevertheless, elements of Mitogaku and the Sonnō jōi rhetoric later helped provide an ideological bridge from late-Edo activism to the political changes of the Bakumatsu and Meiji periods, although the specific, state-endorsed doctrine of kokutai was not codified until much later (for example, in the 1937 Kokutai no Hongi).

== From 1868 to 1945 ==
=== From 1868 to 1890 ===
Katō Hiroyuki (1836–1916) and Fukuzawa Yukichi (1835–1901) were Meiji period scholars who analyzed the dominance of Western civilization and urged progress for the Japanese nation.

In 1874, Katō wrote the Kokutai Shinron (国体新論 "New Theory of the National Body/Structure"), which criticized traditional Chinese and Japanese theories of government and, adopting Western theories of natural rights, proposed a constitutional monarchy for Japan. He contrasted between kokutai and seitai (政体 "government body/structure"). Brownlee explains.

The Kokutai-seitai distinction enabled conservatives to identify clearly as Kokutai, National Essence, the "native Japanese", eternal, and immutable aspects of their polity, derived from history, tradition, and custom, and focused on the Emperor. The form of government, Seitai, a secondary concept, then consisted of the historical arrangements for the exercise of political authority. Seitai, the form of government, was historically contingent and changed through time. Japan had experienced in succession direct rule by the Emperors in ancient times, then the rule of the Fujiwara Regents, then seven hundred years of rule by shōguns, followed by the allegedly direct rule of the Emperors again after the Meiji Restoration. Each was a seitai, a form of government. In this understanding, the modern system of government under the Meiji Constitution, derived this time from foreign sources, was nothing more than another form of Japanese government, a new seitai. The Constitution was nothing fundamental.

The concept of the kokutai was popularized during the Meiji era as Japanese elites had embraced a "crude Social Darwinism" as their guiding principles, seeing nations as being locked in perpetual struggle with one another for dominance, and as such the purpose of the Japanese state was first and foremost as a machine for conducting foreign policy. In order to maintain support for the existing social system and for this view as the state for a machine for conducting foreign policy, the idea of the kokutai was popularized with the Japanese people being liked to one vast family under the rule of the patriarchal god-emperor. The American historian M. G. Sheftall wrote that the concept of the kokutai was the ideological foundation stone of Japanese militarism, writing for millions of Japanese the kokutai was "...the mystical embodiment of the essential unity of the Japanese people, inextricably bound up with völkish ideas about the mythical divine origins of the nation, all under the august beneficence of the institution of the divine emperor and the proverbial protection of several millennia worth of ancestral ghosts. For the IJA [Imperial Japanese Army] and tens of millions of Emperor Meiji's subjects, the kokutai was not merely a source of pride and spiritual power for the nation, it was the lifeworld of the nation in toto, not only in social and political terms, but also in theological and cosmological terms, and no means were too extreme and no sacrifice too great if deemed necessary for its survival". Sheftall wrote this way of viewing the kokutai as divinely sanctioned by a god-emperor led to a certain psychological in-balance as it was difficult for those who believed in the kokutai to accept any setback, which explains the immense rage that periodically erupted over any setback to Japan. In 1905, the Treaty of Portsmouth mediated by the American president Theodore Roosevelt ended the Russian-Japanese war, where Japan made gains, but nowhere near what was expected as the costs of the war had nearly bankrupted Japan, and thus the treaty was more favorable to Russia than it was assumed would be the case. The Treaty of Portsmouth led to anti-American rioting breaking out all over Japan and was presented in Japan as a national humiliation.

Fukuzawa Yukichi was an influential author and translator for the Japanese Embassy to the United States (1860). His 1875 "Bunmeiron no Gairyaku" (文明論の概略 "An Outline of a Theory of Civilization") contradicted traditional ideas about kokutai. He reasoned that it was not unique to Japan and that every nation could be said to have a kokutai "national sovereignty". While Fukuzawa respected the Emperor of Japan, he believed kokutai did not depend upon myths of unbroken descent from Amaterasu.

=== Meiji Constitution ===
The Constitution of the Empire of Japan of 1889 created a form of constitutional monarchy with the kokutai sovereign emperor and seitai organs of government. Article 4 declares that "the Emperor is the head of the Empire, combining in Himself the rights of sovereignty", uniting the executive, legislative, and judicial branches of government, although subject to the "consent of the Imperial Diet". This system utilized a democratic form, but in practice was closer to an absolute monarchy. The legal scholar Josefa López notes that under the Meiji Constitution, kokutai acquired an additional meaning.

The Government created a whole perfect new cultural system around the Tennou [Emperor], and the kokutai was the expression of it. Moreover, the kokutai was the basis of the sovereignty. According to Tatsukichi Minobe, kokutai is understood as the "shape of the Estate" in the sense of "Tenno as the organ of the Estate", while the authoritarians gave the kokutai a mystical power. The Tennou was a "god" among "humans", the incarnation of the national morals. This notion of kokutai was extra-juridical, something more cultural than positive.

This stemmed from drafter Itō Hirobumi's rejection of some European notions as unfit for Japan, as they stemmed from European constitutional practice and Christianity. The references to the kokutai were the justification of the emperor's authority through his divine descent and the unbroken line of emperors, and the unique relationship between subject and sovereign. The "family-state" element in it was given a great deal of prominence by political philosophy. Many conservatives supported these principles as central to Nihon shugi (日本主義, "Japanism", or Nihon gunkoku shugi, Japanese militarism), as an alternative to rapid Westernization. Nihon shugi is an ideology that values the traditional Japanese spirit and sets the tone of the state and society; it emerged in this period as a reaction to the Meiji government's radical Europeanization policy. Nihon shugi is a kind of "kokka shugi" (国家主義, lit. "statism" or "nationalism") ideology. Nihon Shugi opposed 'Europeanism' (欧化主義), including democracy and socialism, which it considered foreign to Japanese tradition, and during the Taishō and Shōwa era, it emphasized the Kokutai ideology centered on the emperor as opposed to Marxism.

Initially, perceived threats to the kokutai were seen as coming from abroad, but starting in the early 20th century there was a tendency to see threats to the kokutai as coming from within. The internal threats to the kokutai were seen first and foremost as class consciousness as Japanese peasants moved to cities to become the working class of the Japanese industrial revolution while other Japanese rose up to become a new middle class, both developments which were seen as threatening the kokutai between dividing Japanese society into classes with different interests. Other perceived threats to the kokutai were socialism and the rise of a trade union movement along with the rise of consumerism which were as seen as threatening the spiritual unity of the kokutai. Finally, "Westernization" in a cultural sense was seen as damaging the kokutai by introducing foreign ideas into society. Paradoxically, the Russian-Japanese war emphasised these concerns about the cracks in the unity of the kokutai as it was believed that the principle reason for Russia's defeat was the gulf between the aristocratic officers of the Imperial Russian Army vs. the "salt-of-the-earth" common Russian soldiers, and that if a similar gulf were to emerge in Japanese society, then Japan too would be defeated in war.

In 1910, the Army Minister Tanaka Giichi engaged in a project in "mass social engineering" by founding the semi-official Zaigo Gunjin Kai (Imperial Military Reserve Association) that worked closely with the Army Ministry to "spread militaristic thought among the population at large" as its founding charter put it. The purpose of the Zaigo Gunjin Kai was to solidify support for the kokutai as defined by the Imperial Japanese Army, which marked the beginning of the IJA as a political force. In 1915, the Imperial Military Reserve Association founded the Youth Associations designed to provide realistic military training for Japanese high school students. Later on in the 1920s, the Army Minister General Kazushige Ugaki founded the Youth Training Schools and the Attached Officer Program under which active duty serving officers worked as teachers in every elementary school and every high school in Japan. Under the Attached Officer Program, IJA officers taught the youth of Japan military tactics and drill, gymnastics and what Sheftall called "a heavy dose of indoctrination in ultra-nationalistic kokutai ideology under the guise of 'civics'". This militarization of the educational system led to a marked xenophobic and militaristic mood amongst the Japanese people who had been indoctrinated into believing to fight and die for the god-Emperor as the leader of the kokutai was their highest duty.

=== Taishō Democracy ===
From the Xinhai Revolution to the enactment of the Peace Preservation Law (1911–1925), the most important pre-World War II democracy movement "Taishō Democracy" occurred. During the Taishō Democracy, the political theorist Sakuzō Yoshino (1878–1933) rejected Western democracy minshu shugi (民主主義 lit. "people rule principle/-ism") and proposed a compromise on imperial democracy minpon shugi (民本主義 "people based principle/-ism"). However, as Japanese nationalism grew, questions arose whether the kokutai emperor could be limited by the seitai government.

The Peace Preservation Law of 1925 forbade both forming and belonging to any organization that proposed altering the kokutai or the abolishment of private property, in effect criminalizing socialism, communism, republicanism and other anti-Tenno ideologies. The Tokkō ("Special Higher Police") was established to investigate political groups that might threaten Tenno-centered social order of Japan.

=== World War II ===
Tatsukichi Minobe (1873–1948), a professor emeritus of law at Tokyo Imperial University, theorized that under the Meiji Constitution, the emperor was an organ of the state and not a sacrosanct power beyond the state. This was regarded as lèse-majesté. Minobe was appointed to the House of Peers in 1932 but forced to resign after an assassination attempt and vehement criticisms that he was disloyal to the emperor.

Great efforts were made to foment a "Japanese spirit" even in popular culture, as in the promotion of the "Song of Young Japan".

Brave warriors united in justice
In spirit a match for a million –
Ready like the myriad cherry blossoms to scatter
In the spring sky of the Shōwa Restoration.

The national debates over kokutai led the Prime Minister Prince Fumimaro Konoe to appoint a committee of Japan's leading professors to deliberate the matter. In 1937, they issued the Kokutai no Hongi (国体の本義, "Cardinal Principles of the National Body/Structure"). Miller gives this description. Increasingly, the kokutai was defined in militarised terms in the 1930s with calls being made for a gunkoku ("military nation") under which the entirety of the Japanese nation would be mobilised for war in peacetime with Japan to become a modern Asian version of ancient Sparta.

The document known as the Kokutai no Hongi was actually a pamphlet of 156 pages, an official publication of the Japanese Ministry of Education, first issued in March 1937 and eventually circulated in millions of copies throughout the home islands and the empire. It contained the official teaching of the Japanese state on every aspect of domestic policy, international affairs, culture, and civilization.

It clearly stated its purpose: to overcome social unrest and to develop a new Japan. From this pamphlet, pupils were taught to put the nation before the self, and that they were part of the state and not separate from it. It also instructed them in the principle of hakkō ichiu ("eight cords, one roof"), which would be used to justify imperialism.

Brownlee concludes that after the Kokutai no Hongi proclamation,

It is clear that at this stage in history, they were no longer dealing with a concept to generate spiritual unity like Aizawa Seishisai in 1825, or with a political theory of Japan designed to accommodate modern institutions of government, like the Meiji Constitution. The committee of professors from prestigious universities sought to define the essential truths of Japan, which might be termed religious, or even metaphysical, because they required faith at the expense of logic and reason. (2006:13)

The Ministry of Education promulgated it throughout the school system.

By 1937, "election purification", originally aimed at corruption, required that no candidate set the people in opposition to either the military or the bureaucracy. This was required because voters were required to support imperial rule.

Some objections to the founding of the Taisei Yokusankai (Imperial Rule Assistance Association) came on the grounds that kokutai already required all imperial subjects to support imperial rule. Conservative thinkers voiced concerns that the establishment of an empowered class of aides to the emperor was akin to the creation of a new shogunate.

For the leaders of Japan's "fascist-nationalist clique", writes Miller, "kokutai had become a convenient term for indicating all the ways in which they believed that the Japanese nation, as a political as well as a racial entity, was simultaneously different from and superior to all other nations on earth."

This term, and what it meant, were widely inculcated in propaganda. The final letters of kamikaze pilots expressed, above all, that their motivations were gratitude to Japan and to its Emperor as the embodiment of kokutai. A sailor might give his life to save the picture of the Emperor on a submarine.

During World War II, some anti-modernist intellectuals argued that prior to the Meiji Restoration, Japan was always a classless society under a benevolent emperor, but the restoration had plunged the nation into Western materialism (an argument that ignored commercialism and ribald culture in the Tokugawa era), which had caused people to forget their nature. To recover their traditional identity, Japanese citizens had to actively participate in the war effort.

"Japanist" unions endeavoured to win support by disavowing class violence and pledging support for nation and emperor. Nevertheless, because of the mistrust of unions in such unity, the Japanese went to replace them with "councils" in every factory, containing both management and worker representatives to contain conflict. Like the Nazi councils they were copying, this was part of a program to create a classless national unity.

Because many religions had figures that distracted from the central emperor, they were attacked, such as the Oomoto sect condemned for worshipping figures other than Amaterasu, and in 1939, the Religious Organization authorized the shutting down of any religion that did not conform to the Imperial Way, which the authorities promptly used.

Hirohito evoked the Kokutai in his surrender broadcast, which announced the Japanese acceptance of the Potsdam Declaration (unconditional surrender).

== Post-1945 ==
By the surrender of Japan in 1945, the significance of kokutai diminished. In autumn 1945, GHQ forbade circulation of the Kokutai no Hongi and on 15 October repealed the 1925 Peace Preservation Law. By the enactment of the Constitution of the State of Japan (3 May 1947), the Emperor's sovereignty and the lèse-majesté were repealed.

Nevertheless, some authors, including Miller, believe that traces of Japanese kokutai "are quite as vivid today as they ever were".

In the 21st century, Japanese nationalists, such as those affiliated with the Nippon Kaigi lobby, have begun using the phrase "kunigara" (国柄, "national character").

== See also ==
- An Investigation of Global Policy with the Yamato Race as Nucleus
- Gekokujō
- Huaxia
- Imperial Rescript on Education
- Japanese Historical Text Initiative
- Hirohito surrender broadcast (Gyokuon-hōsō)
- Kokuchūkai (Column of the Nation Society)
- National Spiritual Mobilization Movement
- Shinbutsu-shūgō
- Socialist thought in Imperial Japan
- Statism in Shōwa Japan
- Uyoku dantai (Nationalist groups of Japan)
- Yangmingism
- Yasukuni Shrine
