= Yasutoshi Yukawa =

Yasutoshi Yukawa (1941 – 25 August 2014) was a Japanese linguist who contributed to African and Tibetan linguistics. In 2006 his students and colleagues honoured his work with a Festschrift

Yasutoshi Yukawa's initial research interest was Theoretical Linguistics, especially syntax and semantics (1950s-60s). During the 1960s and 1970s he published several important papers on Lhasa dialect of Tibetan. He began work on African linguistic in 1975. His main contribution is description of Bantu languages, their genetic classification and tone systems.
