= Ode of Showa Restoration =

Anthem of the Young Officers Movement

The Ode of Showa Restoration (昭和維新(しょうわいしん)の歌(うた), shouwaishin no uta), also known as the Song of Young Japan (青年(せいねん)日本(にほん)の歌(うた), seinen nihon no uta) is a 1930 song by Japanese naval officer Mikami Taku. It was composed as an anthem for the Young Officers Movement.

The song makes strong appeal to natural and religious imagery. It also references the tragic ancient Chinese hero Qu Yuan, a righteous official and poet of the doomed Chu State in pre-imperial China.

== Background ==
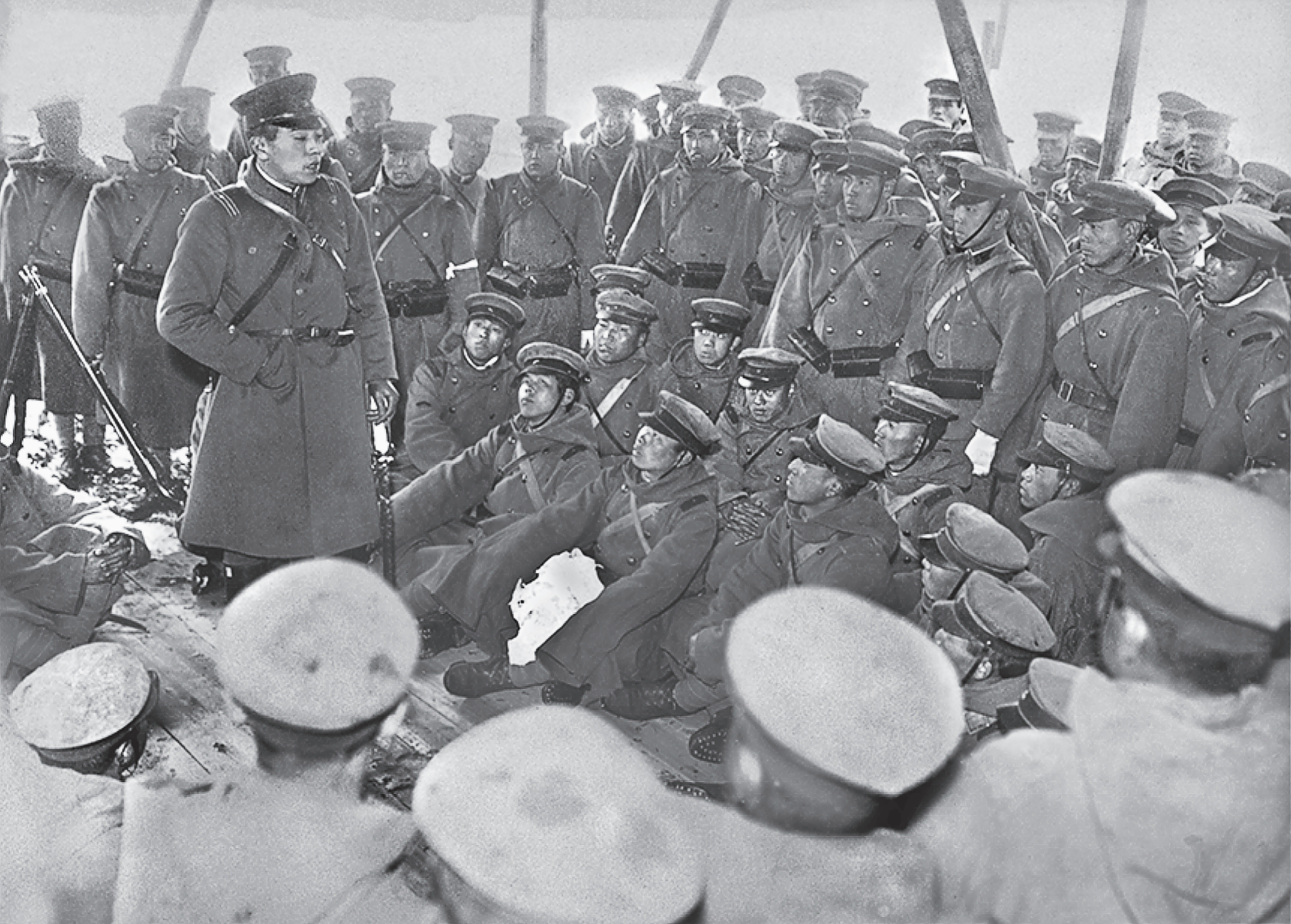
Rebel troops during the 26 February incident

The Showa Restoration was a movement promoted by Japanese author Ikki Kita, with the goal of restoring power to the newly enthroned Japanese Emperor Hirohito and abolishing the liberal Taishō democracy. The aims of the "Showa Restoration" were similar to the Meiji Restoration as the groups who envisioned it imagined a small group of qualified people backing up a strong Emperor. The Cherry Blossom Society envisioned such a restoration.

The February 26 incident was another attempt to bring it about, failing heavily because they were unable to secure the support of the Emperor. The chief conspirators surrendered hoping to make their trial advance the cause, which was foiled by having the trials conducted secretly.

Although all such attempts failed, it was a first step on the rise of Japanese militarism.

== Lyrics ==
English translation	Japanese lyrics	Romaji lyrics
Angry waves swell from the depths of the Miluo (Note: The Miluo River that feeds into Dongting Lake is where Qu Yuan famously drowned himself in protest.) Mount Wu's peak is hazy with swirling clouds Alone I stand in this murky and turbid world My blood simmers in righteous anger	汨羅の淵に波騒ぎ 巫山の雲は乱れ飛ぶ 溷濁の世に我れ立てば 義憤に燃えて血潮湧く	Bekira no fuchi ni nami sawagi fuzan no kumo wa midaretobu kondaku no yo ni ware tateba gifun ni moete chishio waku
The monied elite, beholden to nought but wealth and status Thinking nothing of this land and its fate Zaibatsu boast of their wealth but Have not hearts which think of the soil and grain (Note: "Soil and Grain" is an ancient literary Chinese term for the nation and its land. Its use here equips the piece with strong sense of gravity.)	権門上に傲れども 国を憂ふる誠なし 財閥富を誇れども 社稷を思ふ心なし	Kenmonkami ni ogodoredomo kuni o ureuru makoto nashi Zaibatsu tomi o hokoredomo shashoku o omou kokoro nashi
Alas, these signs of the nation's collapse The masses dancing blindly in the stupor of this world In this nightmare, a political din The world is reduced to a round of Go	ああ人栄え国亡ぶ 盲たる民世に踊る 治乱興亡夢に似て 世は一局の碁なりけり	Ā hito sakae kuni horobu meshiitaru tami yo ni odoru chiran kōbō yume ni nite yo wa ikkyoku no go narikeri
Under the spring sky of the Showa Restoration The man (Note: The Sino-Japanese term 丈夫, used here and in the fifth stanza, means something like "a masculine character.") who marshals a righteous cause In his heart is the march of a million troops Ready to fall like ten thousand sakura blossoms	昭和維新の春の空 正義に結ぶ丈夫が 胸裡百万兵足りて 散るや万朶の桜花	Shōwa ishin no haru no sora seigi ni musubu masurao ga kyōri hyakuman hei tarite chiru ya banda no sakurabana
Transcending the shell of crumbled bones One body among the wisps of clouds Standing up with concern for the nation the righteous man's ode begins	古びし死骸乗り越えて 雲漂揺の身は一つ 国を憂ひて立つからは 丈夫の歌なからめや	Furubishi mukuro norikoete kumo hyōyō no mi wa hitotsu kuni o ureite tatsu kara wa masurao no uta nakarame ya
Whether the rage of heaven or the cries of earth The roar of the epoch is thundering now From the people's sleep, endless kalpa past Arise, Japan, at this morn's light!	天の怒りか地の声か そもただならぬ響あり 民永劫の眠りより 醒めよ日本の朝ぼらけ	Ten no ikari ka chi no koe ka somo tadanaranu hibiki ari tami eigō no nemuri yori sameyo Nihon no asaborake
Storm clouds gather in the heavens nine Across the four seas, waves rage and crash The hour (Note: The Japanese kanji here means "opportunity" but its specified phonetic reading means "time.") of revolution is here and nigh Sweeping Japan like the winds of dusk	見よ九天の雲は垂れ 四海の水は雄叫びて 革新の機到りぬと 吹くや日本の夕嵐	Miyo kyūten no kumo wa tare shikai no nami wa otakebite kakushin no toki itarinu to fuku ya Nihon no yūarashi
O the boundless sky and land A labyrinth path the man must tread Of the splendors and praises in this dusty earth Whose high castle may yet be seen?	ああうらぶれし天地の 迷ひの道を人はゆく 栄華を誇る塵の世に 誰が高楼の眺めぞや	Ā urabureshi ame tsuchi no mayoi no michi o hito wa yuku eiga o hokoru chiri no yo ni taga kōrō no nagame zo ya
Fame and glory are but the figments of a dream What is immutable is the truth alone Feeling the will and spirit of mortal life Who holds the keys to failure or success?	功名何ぞ夢の跡 消えざるものはただ誠 人生意気に感じては 成否を誰かあげつらふ	Kōmyō nani ka yume no ato kiezaru mono wa tada makoto jinseiiki ni kanjite wa seihi o tareka agetsurau
A tragic ode, the Sorrow at Parting (Note: "Sorrow at Parting" (Li Sao) is one of Qu Yuan's most famous works. Here, the poet despairs that he has been plotted against by evil factions at court with his resulting rejection by his lord and then recounts a series of shamanistic spirit journeys to various mythological realms.) Here the heavy elegy finds its end Setting our hearts we draw our swords A surging sweep, a dance in blood of massacre.	止めよ離騒の一悲曲 悲歌慷慨の日は去りぬ われらが剣今こそは 廓清の血に躍るかな	Yameyo risō no ichi hikyoku hikakōgai no hi wa sarinu ware-ra ga tsurugi ima koso wa kakusei no chi ni odoru kana
