= Mikami Taku =

Japanese navy officer, political activist, nationalist (1905–1971)

Sub-lieutenant Mikami Taku Junior Seventh Rank
- 三上 卓
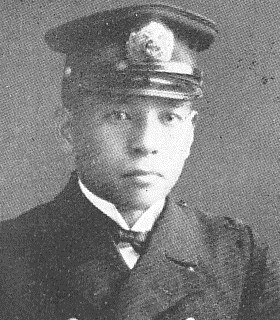
- Mikami in 1933
- Born: March 22, 1905; Saga, Saga, Japan
- Died: October 25, 1971 (aged 66); Izu, Shizuoka, Japan
- Education: Naval Academy, Etajima
- Spouse: Waka Mikami (née Utsunomiya)
- Relatives: General Tarō Utsunomiya; Colonel Michio Utsunomiya
- Military career
- Allegiance: Empire of Japan
- Branch: Imperial Japanese Navy
- Service years: 1926 – 1933
- Rank: Sub-lieutenant（Kaigun-chūi）
- Known for: May 15 incident (Assassination of Prime Minister Tsuyoshi Inukai)
- Other work: Political activist

Mikami Taku or Mikami Takashi (三上 卓; 22 March 1905 – 25 October 1971) was a lieutenant in the Imperial Japanese Navy, who participated in the May 15 Incident in which Prime Minister Inukai Tsuyoshi was assassinated.

He composed the "Ode of Showa Restoration" as an anthem for the Young Officers Movement.

== Biography ==
Mikami Taku was born in Saga, Saga Prefecture. He graduated Naval Academy, Etajima in 1926. In 1930, He wrote the lyrics to Seinen Nihon no Uta (Ode of Showa Restoration).

In May 1932, Taku attacked Prime Minister Tsuyoshi Inukai in the May 15 Incident. In 1933, he was sentenced to 15 years in prison for mutiny at a naval court-martial in Yokosuka. He served time in Kosuge Prison (Tokyo Detention House). In 1938, he was released on parole after four years and nine months, after a series of commutations due to pardons for Kigensetsu anniversary and the 50th anniversary of Meiji Constitution's promulgation.

In March 1941, Mikami founded Hishirogi Juku (ひもろぎ塾) with Nisshō Inoue, Yoshitaka Yotsumoto, Goro Hishinuma and others, and served as the brain behind former Prime Minister Fumimaro Konoe. In 1950, he was sentenced to five years in prison for drug trafficking. In 1961, he was arrested for his involvement in another coup plot, the abortive Sanmu incident.

He died in Izu, Shizuoka, in 1971.
