= May 15 incident =

Attempted coup d'état in Japan in 1932

Coordinates: 35.6725°N 139.7438°E

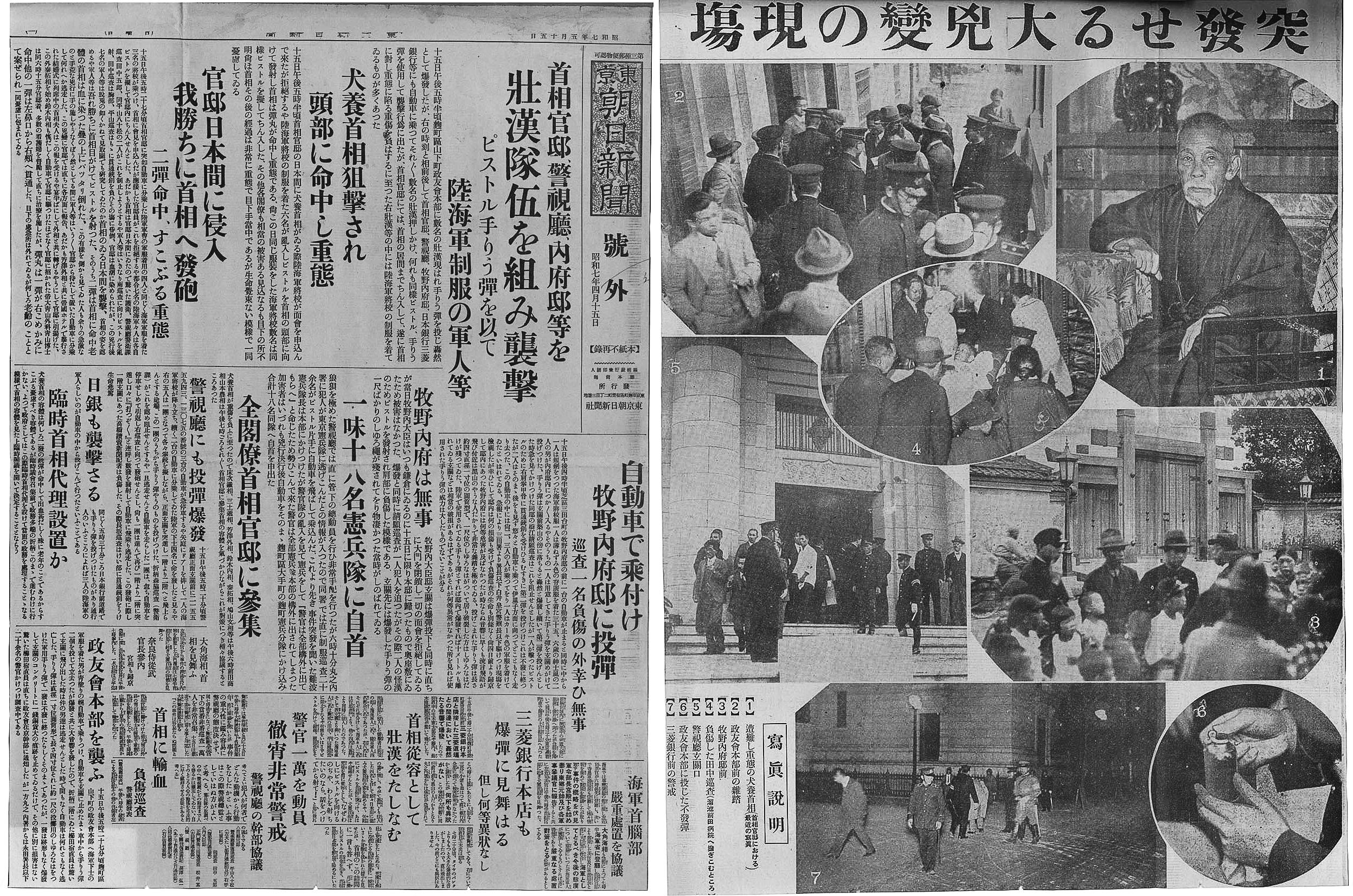
Tokyo Asahi Shimbun describing the May 15 incident and assassination of Prime Minister Inukai Tsuyoshi

The May 15 incident (五・一五事件, Goichigo jiken) was an attempted coup d'état in the Empire of Japan, on May 15, 1932, launched by reactionary elements of the Imperial Japanese Navy, aided by cadets in the Imperial Japanese Army and civilian remnants of the ultranationalist League of Blood (Ketsumei-dan).

Prime Minister Inukai Tsuyoshi was assassinated by 11 young naval officers. The following trial and popular support of the Japanese population led to extremely light sentences for the assassins, strengthening the rising power of Japanese militarism and weakening democracy and the rule of law in the Empire of Japan.

== Background ==
As a result of the ratification of the London Naval Treaty limiting the size of the Imperial Japanese Navy, a movement grew within the junior officer corps to overthrow the government, and to replace it with military rule. This movement had parallels in the Sakurakai secret society organized within the Imperial Japanese Army. The naval officers established contacts with the ultranationalist Nisshō Inoue and his "League of Blood", and agreed with his philosophy that to bring about a "Shōwa Restoration", it would be necessary to assassinate leading political and business figures (Zaibatsu).

In 1932, during the League of Blood Incident, Inoue's group killed Junnosuke Inoue, the former Minister of Finance and head of the Rikken Minseitō, and Dan Takuma, the Director-General of Mitsui Holding Company, on 9 February and 5 March respectively. While only two high-profile leaders were killed, the group had initially planned to assassinate a total of twenty financial and political leaders.

== Incident ==
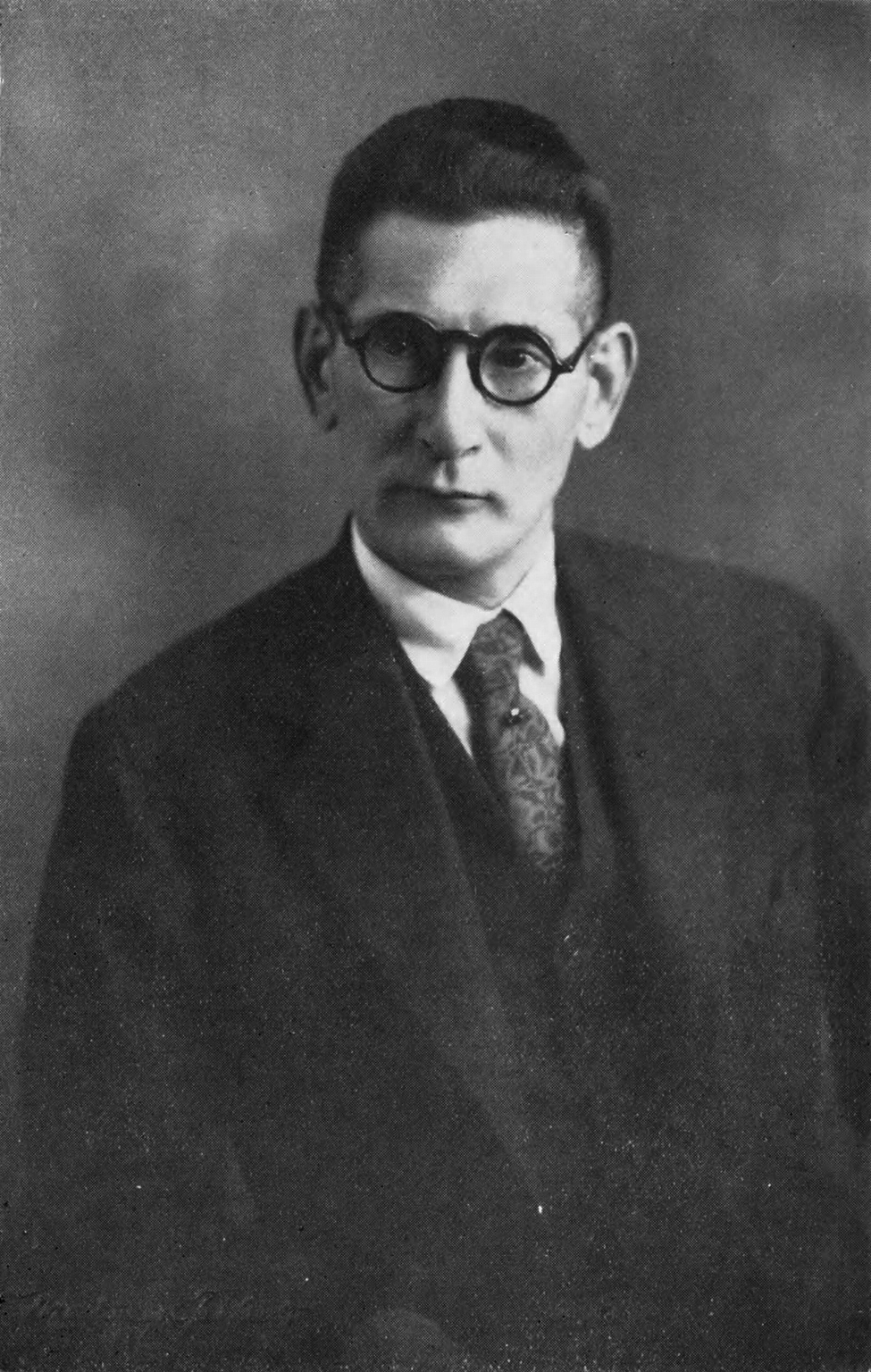
Shūmei Ōkawa

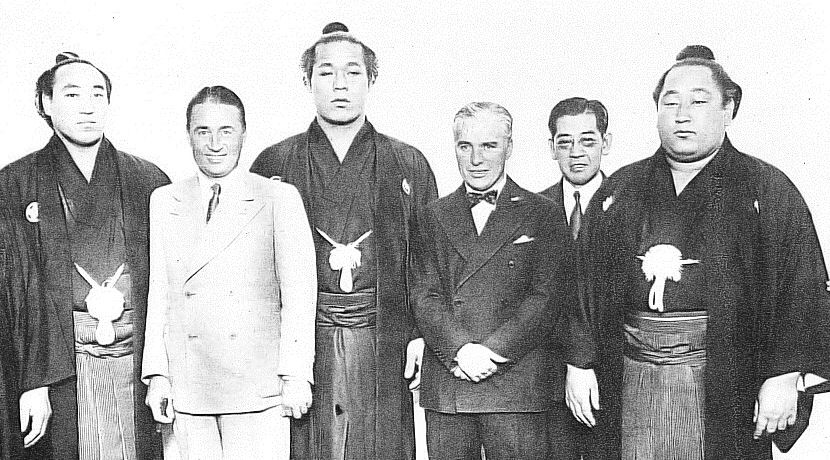
Chaplin (third from right) and Sumo wrestlers around the time of the incident

On May 15, 1932, the naval officers, aided by army cadets, and right-wing civilian elements (including Shūmei Ōkawa, Tōyama Mitsuru, and Kōzaburō Tachibana) staged their own attempt to complete what had been started in the League of Blood Incident.

Prime Minister Inukai Tsuyoshi was shot by eleven young naval officers, many of whom had only recently turned twenty years of age, in the prime minister's residence. Inukai's last words were, roughly, "If I told you, you would understand" (話せば分かる, hanaseba wakaru) to which his killers replied "Dialogue is useless" (問答無用, mondō muyō).

The original assassination plan had included killing the English film star Charlie Chaplin, who had arrived in Japan on May 14, 1932, at a reception for Chaplin planned by Prime Minister Inukai. "These activists, eager to inject a nativist Yamato spirit into politics, recognised the charged political nature of mass culture". Chaplin's murder would facilitate war with the U.S., create anxiety in Japan, and lead to "restoration" in the name of the emperor. When the prime minister was killed, his son Inukai Takeru was watching a sumo wrestling match with Charlie Chaplin, which probably saved both their lives.

The insurgents also attacked the residence of Makino Nobuaki, the Lord Keeper of the Privy Seal and head of the Rikken Seiyūkai political party, and tossed hand-grenades into Mitsubishi Bank headquarters in Tokyo, as well as several electrical transformer substations.

In spite of the murder of the prime minister, the attempted coup d'état was not successful, and the rebellion as a whole proved a failure. The participants took a taxi to the police headquarters and surrendered themselves to the Kempeitai without a struggle.

== Consequences ==
The eleven officers who murdered Prime Minister Inukai were court-martialed. During the proceedings, the accused used the trial as a platform to proclaim their loyalty to the emperor and to arouse popular sympathy by appealing for reforms of the government and economy. By the trial's end, the court had received 110,000 clemency petitions, either signed or written entirely in blood, from sympathizers around the country pleading for a lenient sentence. Additionally, nine youths in Niigata asked to be tried by the court instead of the accused, and sent the court a jar containing nine of their own pickled severed pinky fingers as a gesture of their sincerity.

The punishment handed down by the court was extremely light, and there was little doubt in the Japanese press that the murderers of Prime Minister Inukai would be released in a couple of years, if not sooner. Failure to severely punish the plotters in the May 15 incident further eroded the rule of law and the power of the democratic government in Japan to confront the military. Indirectly, it led to the February 26 incident and the increasing rise of Japanese militarism.

== Popular culture ==
- The incident is discussed at length in Season 2, Episode 5 of Ghost in the Shell: Stand Alone Complex (2004). The events of the incident are emulated, and form a significant basis of the story events of that series.
- In Christian Kracht's novel "The Dead" (2016) the incident is at the core of the story. Instead of a sumo match, Chaplin is visiting a No theatre together with the PM's son.

== See also ==
- Mikami Taku, one of the 11 young officers who killed the Prime Minister

== Bibliography ==
- Beasley, W.G. (2000). The Rise of Modern Japan, 3rd Edition: Political, Economic, and Social Change since 1850. Palgrave Macmillan. ISBN 0-312-23373-6.
- Borkwith, Mark (1989). Pacific Century: The Emergence of Modern Pacific Asia. Westview Press. ISBN 0-8133-3471-3.
- Oka, Yoshitake (1984). Five Political Leaders of Modern Japan: Ito Hirobumi, Okuma Shigenobu, Hara Takashi, Inukai Tsuyoshi, and Saionji Kimmochi. University of Tokyo Press. ISBN 0-86008-379-9.
- Sims, Richard (2001). Japanese Political History Since the Meiji Renovation 1868–2000. Palgrave Macmillan. ISBN 0-312-23915-7.
- Spector, Ronald (1985). Eagle Against the Sun: The American War With Japan. Vintage. ISBN 0-394-74101-3.
- Toland, John (2003). The Rising Sun: The Decline and Fall of the Japanese Empire, 1936–1945 (reprint ed.). Modern Library. ISBN 0-8129-6858-1.
