= Tatsukichi Minobe =

Japanese politician

- 美濃部 達吉
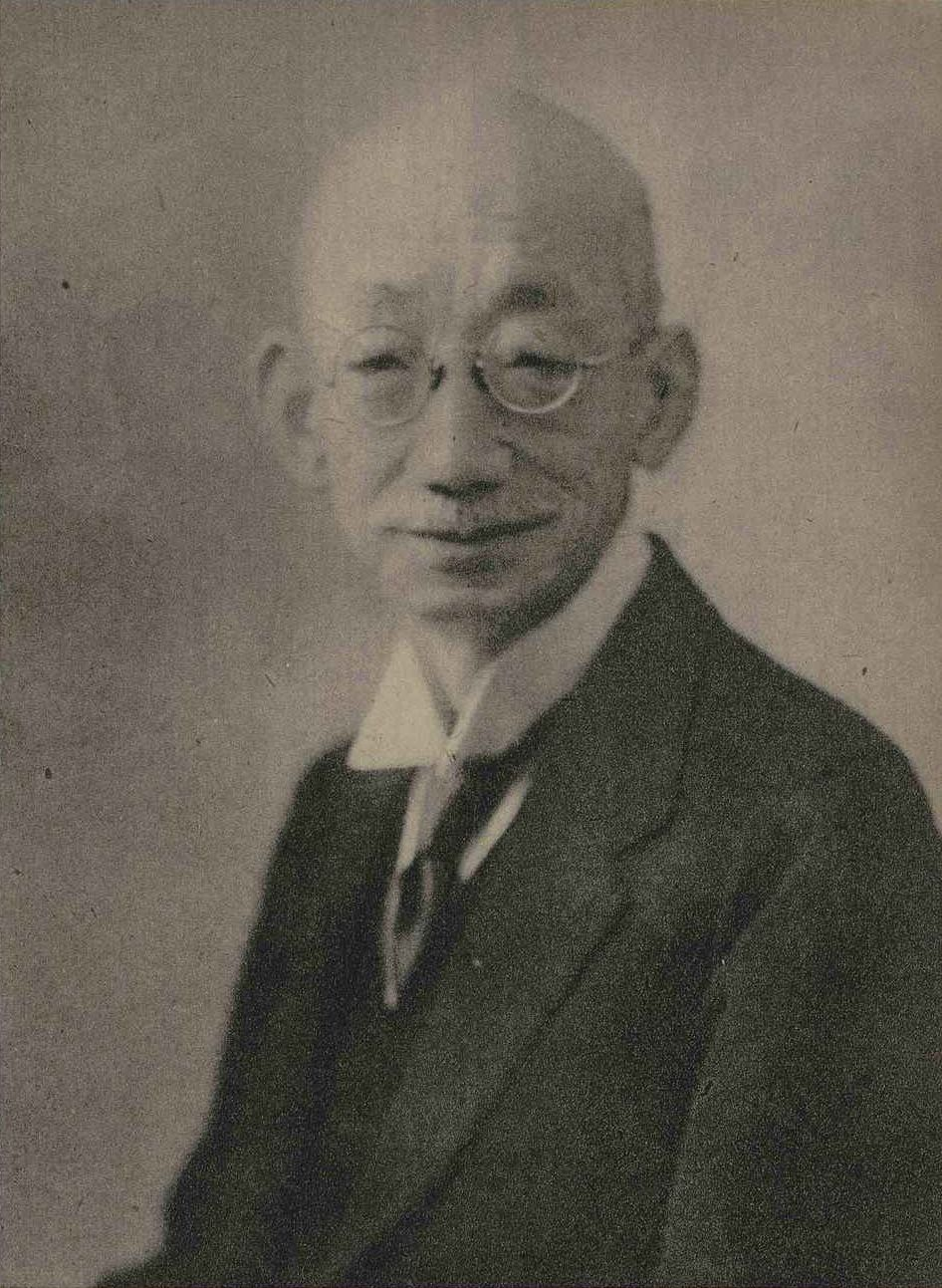
- Minobe in 1943

Member of the Privy Council
- In office 26 January 1946 – 2 May 1947
- Monarch: Hirohito

Member of the House of Peers
- In office 10 May 1932 – 18 September 1935 Nominated by the Emperor

Personal details
- Born: 7 May 1873 Kako, Hyōgo, Japan
- Died: 23 May 1948 (aged 75) Kichijōji, Tokyo, Japan
- Children: Ryokichi Minobe
- Relatives: Kikuchi Dairoku (father-in-law)

Tatsukichi Minobe (美濃部 達吉, Minobe Tatsukichi; 7 May 1873 – 23 May 1948) was a Japanese statesman and scholar of constitutional law. His interpretation of the role of the monarchy in the pre-war Empire of Japan was a source of considerable controversy in the increasingly radicalized political environment of Japan in the 1930s.

His wife was the daughter of Dairoku Kikuchi, and his son Ryokichi Minobe was Governor of Tokyo (1967–1979).

== Biography ==
Minobe was born in Takasago City, Hyōgo Prefecture to a doctor of Chinese medicine. He graduated from the law school of Tokyo Imperial University in 1897, where one of his mentors was future Privy Councilor Ichiki Kitokurō. He went to work for the Home Ministry, and was sent for further studies to Germany, France and the United Kingdom, returning to Japan in 1902 to take up a position as a professor at Tokyo Imperial University.

In 1912, Minobe published a work on constitutional interpretation, which came to be known as the “emperor organ theory”. Per Minobe, the “State”, or kokutai was supreme, and even the emperor was only an “organ of the State” as defined through the constitutional structure, rather than a sacred power beyond the state itself. Minobe used the metaphor of the head of the human body to describe the role of the emperor. This thesis was influenced by the work of German legal philosopher Georg Jellinek, whose work, Allgemeine Staatslehre (General Theory of the State) was published in 1900, and also by the British concept of a constitutional monarchy. Minobe warned that the emperor’s right of supreme command over the military needed to be carefully limited by the Diet of Japan if Japan were not to end up with a dual government in which the military would become completely independent and above the rule of law and unaccountable to civilian authority.

From 1924 to 1927, Minobe was the Director of the Faculty of Law at Tokyo Imperial University. From 1911 for 34 years, he was also a counselor in the Bureau of Legislation where he participated in the enactment of several laws. He entered the House of Peers by appointment in 1932.

Minobe’s interpretation of the constitution was generally accepted by bureaucrats and even imperial household until the 1930s, although it had been challenged from the beginning by imperial absolutists such as Yatsuka Hozumi and Shinkichi Uesugi, who held that the emperor was, by definition, the personification of the State itself, and therefore politically unaccountable for his actions, however arbitrary, as defined in Article 3 the Meiji Constitution.

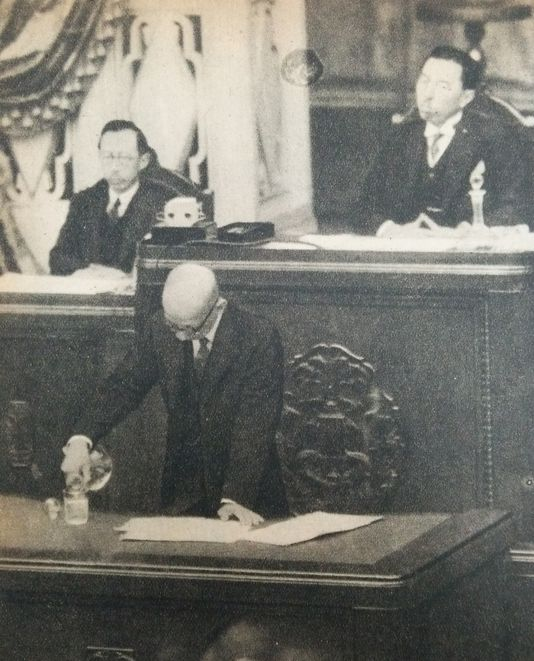
Minobe before Diet, 1935

In the increasingly militant environment of the 1930s, Minobe’s liberal interpretation of the role of the emperor came under attack from military officers and ultranationalists increasingly disillusioned by liberal democracy and corruption in government, which they felt could only be addressed through a Shōwa Restoration in which the emperor would take personal totalitarian control. On 18 February 1935, Baron Takeo Kikuchi, a retired general and member of the House of Peers, launched a public campaign to demand that Prime Minister Keisuke Okada ban Minobe’s works, which he termed to be “traitorous thoughts”. Minobe addressed the Diet of Japan a week later in his own defense, while right-wing groups and Kōdōha officers held a demonstration in downtown Tokyo denouncing him. In early March, Major General Genkuro Eto charged in the lower house of the Diet of Japan that Minobe’s books, specifically Kenpo Satsuyo (Compendium of the Constitution) and Tsuiho kenpo seigi (Additional Commentaries on the Constitution) were works of lese-majeste, and that Minobe should be arrested. Bowing to severe political pressure, Okada asked Minobe to resign from his posts later that month, banned some of his works, and initiated a government-sponsored campaign to discredit his works in favor of the tenets supporting the concept of the divine right of the emperor, which quickly merged with emperor worship and national chauvinism.

Following the surrender of Japan after World War II, Minobe was active as an advisor in the creation of the post-war Constitution of Japan, as well as an advisor to the Privy Council. He died in 1948.
