= Yoshio Kodama =

Japanese ultranationalist and organized crime power broker

- 児玉 誉士夫
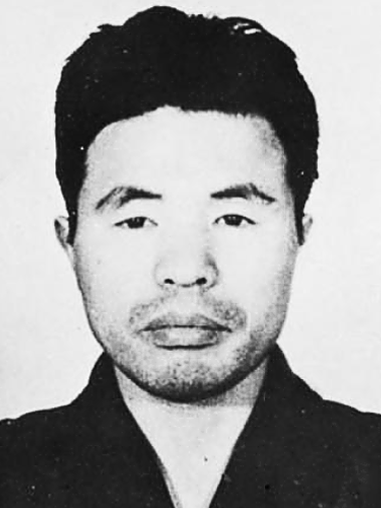
- Mug shot of Kodama while he was held as a suspected war criminal in Sugamo Prison, 1946
- Born: February 18, 1911; Nihonmatsu, Fukushima, Japan
- Died: January 17, 1984 (aged 72); Tokyo, Japan
- Occupations: Political fixer, smuggler, businessman, spy
- Spouse: Sayoko (1940–1958)
- Criminal charges: Conspiracy to commit murder, tax evasion
- Penalty: A total of six and half years in prisons

Yoshio Kodama (児玉 誉士夫, Kodama Yoshio; February 18, 1911 – January 17, 1984) was a Japanese right-wing ultranationalist and a prominent figure in the rise of organized crime in Japan. The most famous kuromaku, or behind-the-scenes power broker, of the 20th century, he was active in Japan's political arena and criminal underworld from the 1930s to the 1970s, and became enormously wealthy through his involvement in smuggling operations.

== Early life and activism ==
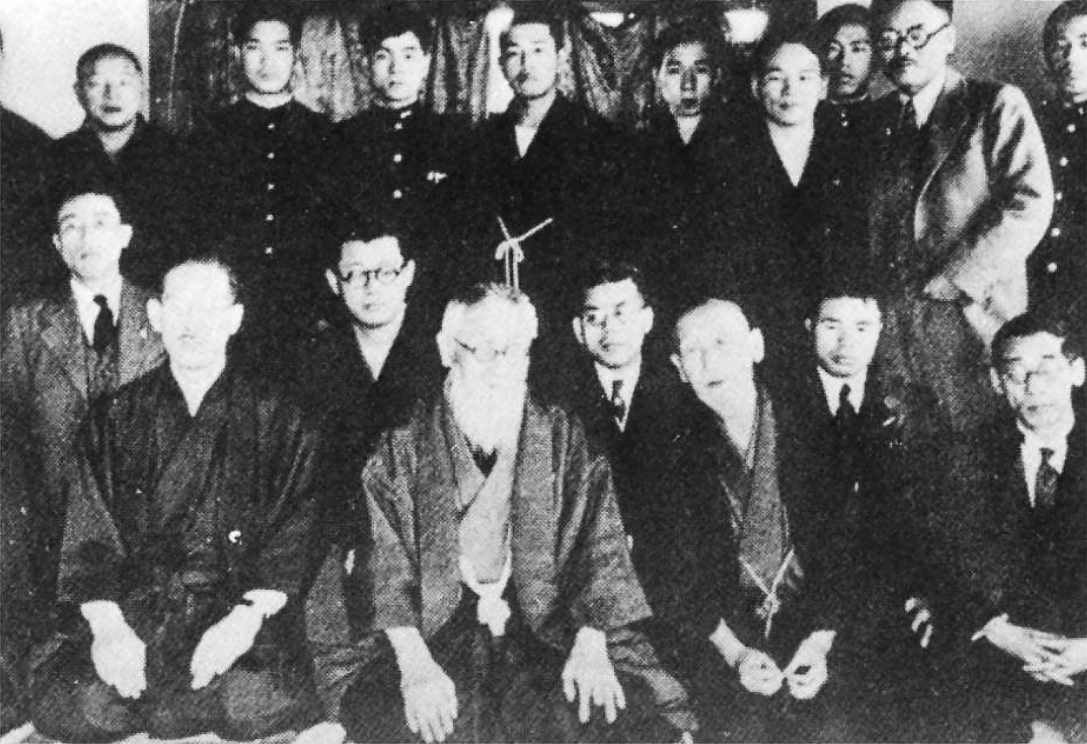
Yoshio Kodama (first row, second from right) in a group photograph with right-wing doyen Mitsuru Tōyama in 1929

Yoshio Kodama was born on February 18, 1911, in Nihonmatsu, Fukushima, Japan, to a family formerly of samurai status. Kodama was the fifth son of a bankrupt businessman. Due to his family's straitened circumstances, in 1920, Kodama was sent to live with a married older sister in Korea. Returning to Japan, he worked as a labourer at factories and steel mills.

In 1929, Kodama joined the Kenkokukai (建国会), founded by Bin Akao and Shinkichi Uesugi. During a parade that same year, he tried to give Emperor Hirohito a written appeal regarding unemployment, but was arrested and imprisoned for six months. After his release from prison, he joined Tatsuo Tsukui's Radical Patriotic Party (急進愛国党, Kyūshin Aikokutō).

In 1932, Kodama formed his own ultranationalist group called the Independent Youth Society (独立青年社, Dokuritsu Seinensha). Kodama's group, in collaboration with the Tenkōkai (天行会, 'Society for Heavenly Action') made plans to assassinate Prime Minister Makoto Saito and other high officials. The plan was foiled and Kodama was arrested in November 1932, leading to a prison sentence of three years and six months.

== Second Sino-Japanese War and the Pacific War ==
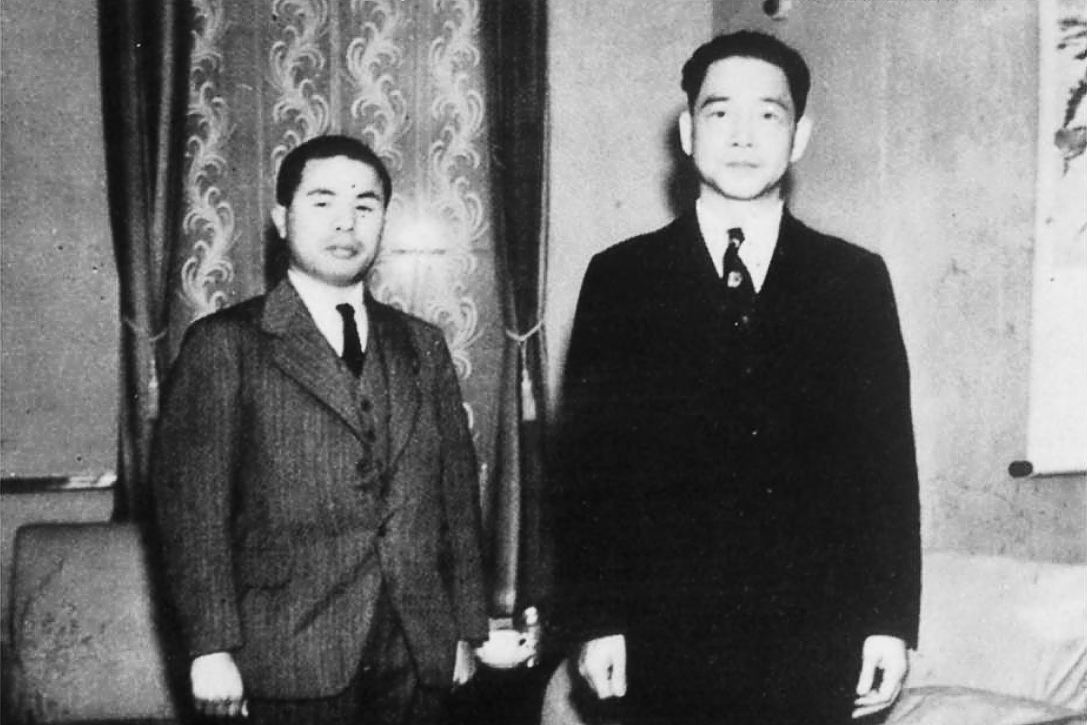
Yoshio Kodama (left) as bodyguard to Wang Jingwei (1939)

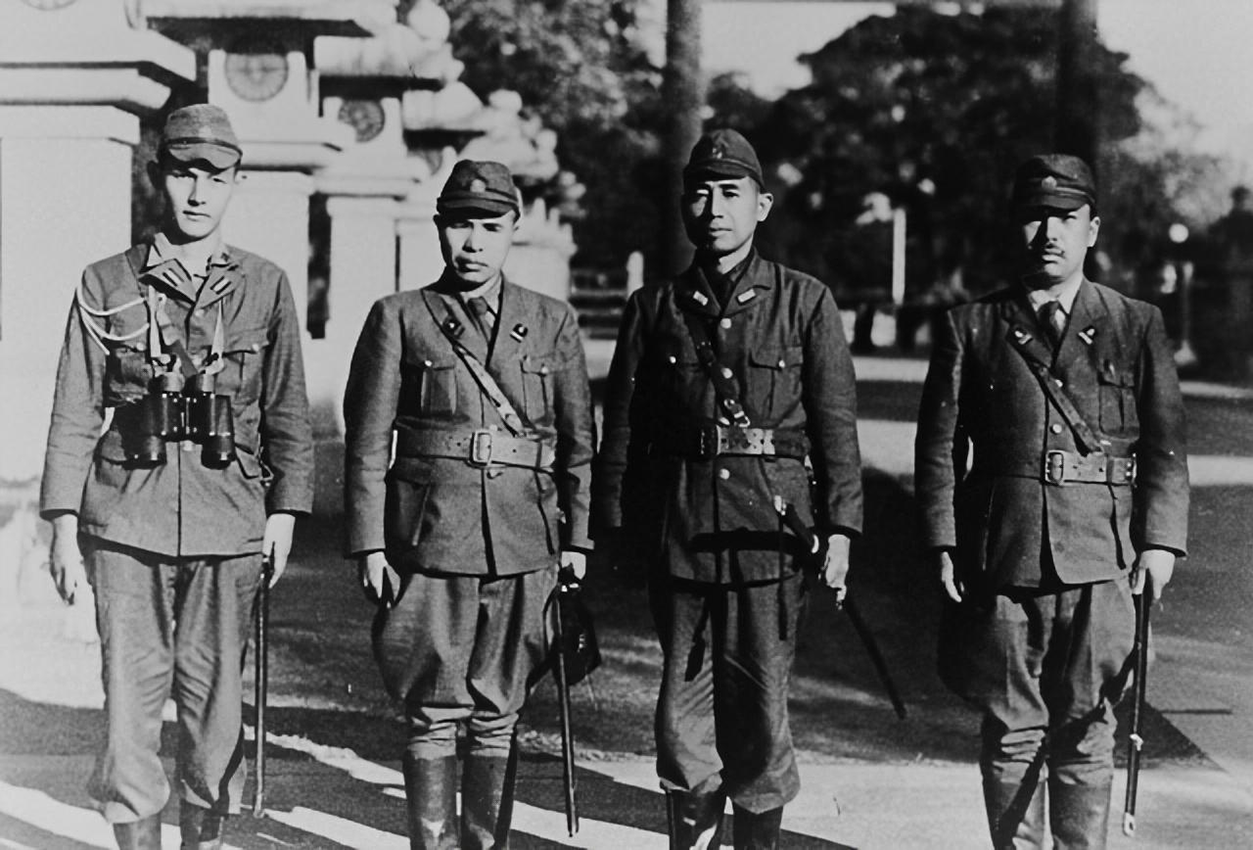
From the left, Deputy Chikanori Moji, Yoshio Kodama, and Vice Admiral Takijirō Ōnishi in February 1945 at the Tainan Shrine in Taiwan

After serving out his sentence, Kodama was released in April 1937, shortly before the outbreak of the Second Sino-Japanese War. He worked for an asianist journal owned by Yoshiaki Kasagi. During this period, he was recruited by Tatsuo Kawai, chief of the Information Bureau of the Ministry of Foreign Affairs, for intelligence activities in China. Kodama belonged to a special investigation team under vice consul Eiichi Iwai in Shanghai. In April 1939, he was tasked with serving as bodyguard to the Chinese collaborator Wang Jingwei and escort him to Shanghai.

With a recommendation from Lt. General Kanji Ishiwara, Kodama later worked under Major Masanobu Tsuji at the China Expeditionary Army Headquarters in Nanjing. He was dismissed in mid-1941 due to Army Minister Hideki Tojo's antipathy towards Ishiwara.

Kodama had joined Ryōichi Sasakawa’s Kokusui Taishu-to (国粹大衆党, Patriotic People’s Party) and became director of its East Asia section in February 1941. In late 1941, Sasakawa recommended Kodama to the Imperial Japanese Navy Air Service, to head a special procurement agency for them in China. This became known as the Kodama Kikan (Kodama Organization). Thanks to his relationship with Admiral Takijirō Ōnishi, Kodama had an exclusive contract as a purchasing agent in China for the Navy Air Service.

With these resources, Kodama was able to use what he described as "self-sacrificing youth" to engage in large-scale plunder in Manchuria and China and sell the stolen goods at a high profit in Japan. He is also said to have distributed opium and narcotics. Kodama publicly regarded this activity as purely idealistic and patriotic. By 1945, Kodama had become one of the richest men in Asia with assets equivalent to $175 million US dollars.

== Post-War detention in Sugamo Prison ==
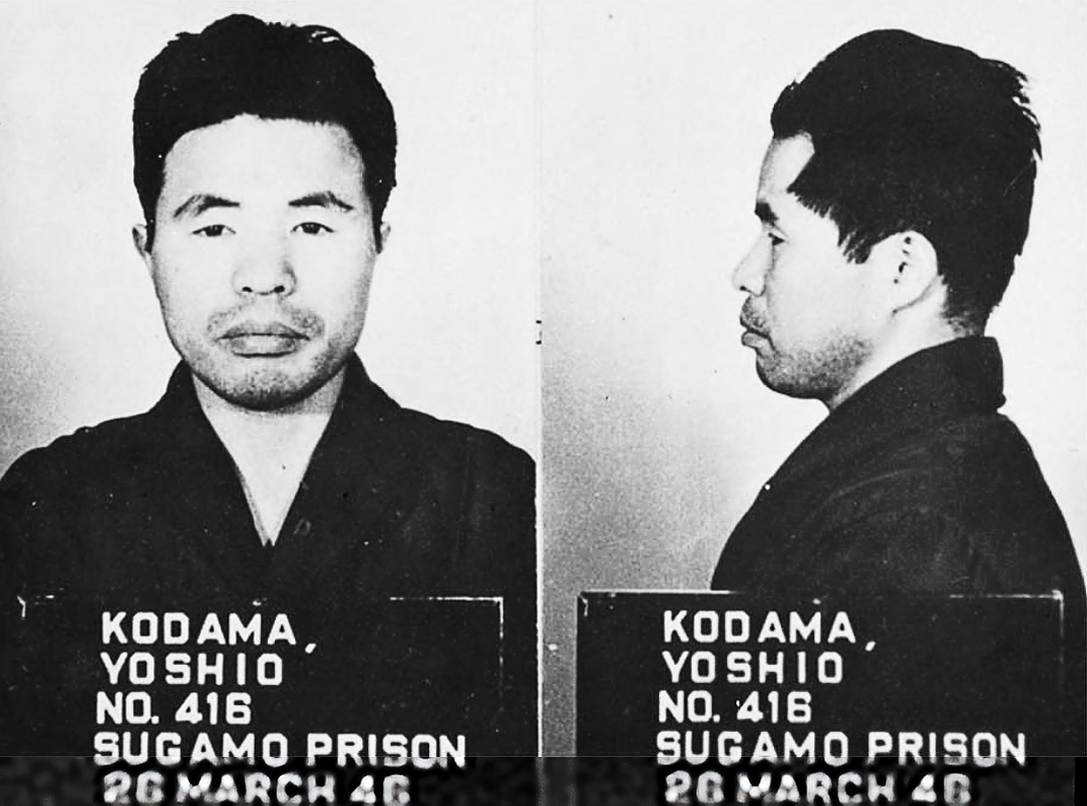
Kodama's mugshot from his time in Sugamo Prison

At the end of World War II, the defeat of Japan initially represented an enormous setback for Kodama. Shortly after the announcement of the unconditional surrender of Japan on August 15, 1945, he witnessed the ritual suicide of Admiral Ōnishi, but was subsequently unable to bring himself to commit seppuku. A little later he acted as an advisor to the Japanese interim government of Prince Naruhiko Higashikuni. Since Kodama feared the confiscation of his property by the US occupation authorities, he gave parts of it to the fixer Karoku Tsuji.

In March 1946, Kodama was arrested by the United States as a suspected Class A war criminal. He was held in Sugamo Prison with Ryōichi Sasakawa, where the two formed a long friendship. Kodama also formed a close relationship with fellow suspected Class-A war criminal (and future prime minister) Nobusuke Kishi. Since he had a lot of time, Kodama was able to keep himself up to date on current events and far-reaching political changes in East Asia in all available daily newspapers. He realized that the new democratic forces in Japan were weak, observing that "in the midst of all this rapid change, there is one thing which is lagging behind. This is parliamentary power." While imprisoned, Kodama wrote Sugamo Diary (a chronicle of his experience in prison) and I Was Defeated (an autobiographical work).

Like many other alleged Japanese war criminals, Kodama was recruited by the US G-2 (Intelligence) under Charles A. Willoughby while in custody. In 1948, the US intelligence community was able to drop all charges against him on the condition that he would support all anti-communist activities of the G-2 CIC division in Asia. On December 24, 1948, he left Sugamo Prison as a free man and was never imprisoned again for the rest of his life. Kodama spent a total of six and a half years of his life in prisons. Kodama, being a right-wing ultranationalist, eagerly fulfilled his end of the bargain, using his fortune and network of contacts to quell labor disputes, root out Communist sympathizers and otherwise fight socialist activities in Japan. In 1949, the CIA paid him to smuggle a shipment of tungsten out of China. The shipment never arrived but Kodama kept his money.

== Political fixer ==
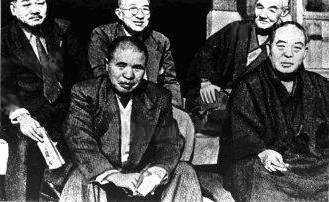
Kodama in January 1953 during a visit by conservative politicians Ichirō Hatoyama and Bukichi Miki to his Tokyo estate. Hatoyama became Prime Minister of Japan a year later. The photo was published in 1953 in Mainichi Shimbun.

In 1949 Kodama led the Meiraki-gumi gang against labor unions at the Hokutan coal mine. He began to use the fortune he had accumulated in China and subsequently hidden, which supposedly amounted to 70 million yen (not including the platinum and diamonds he spirited away), to covertly influence electoral politics in postwar Japan.

In 1955, Kodama's Sugamo Prison acquaintance Nobusuke Kishi, with the covert backing of the CIA, engineered the formation of the conservative Liberal Democratic Party (LDP) via the merger of the Liberal Party and the Democratic Party. In the 1950s and 1960s, the CIA spent millions to support the LDP, for intelligence gathering and to make Japan a bulwark against communism in Asia. Using his preexisting connections to the CIA, Kodama served as a political fixer (kuromaku) who secretly funneled funds to conservatives.

In his role as fixer, conservative politicians turned to Kodama if they had problems. An example of his role as fixer was the planned state visit by US President Dwight D. Eisenhower in 1960, in connection with the revision of U.S.-Japan Security Treaty (known as Anpo in Japanese), intended to cement the U.S.-Japan alliance. In an effort to prevent the ratification of the treaty and prevent Eisenhower's visit, a coalition of left-leaning opposition groups and civic organizations carried out the massive 1960 Anpo Protests. As the protests dramatically escalated in June 1960, now-Prime Minister Nobusuke Kishi asked his old friend Kodama to organize right-wing thugs and yakuza gangsters as a private police force to secure the streets for Eisenhower's visit. Kodama obliged, using his right-wing connections to prepare a "Welcoming Ike to Japan Mobilization Plan" which he claimed would be able to put nearly 150,000 young rightists on the streets in order to "protect" President Eisenhower from left-wing protesters. Kodama's detailed plan promised to mobilize exactly 146,879 men, whereas Japan's National Police Agency later estimated that he could realistically mobilize at most 120,506. As a result, around 28,000 yakuza from different gangs organized a security service on their own and in cooperation with the police. Right-wing groups also staged counter-protests in favor of the Treaty. However, due to the violent June 15th Incident, in which female university student Michiko Kanba was killed, Kishi was forced to cancel Eisenhower's visit and Kodama's force was not needed.

In response to the Anpo protests, Kodama and other right-wing leaders established the All-Japanese Conference of Patriotic Associations (全日本愛国者団体会議, Zen Nihon Aikokusha Dantai Kaigi; abbreviated "Zen'ai Kaigi"), an umbrella organization of 80 right-wing groups and yakuza groups. Zen'ai Kaigi carried out a variety of counter-protest activities in support of the conservative Kishi government, and by the end of the protests had grown to include more than 100 organizations. In this way, the 1960 Anpo protests helped cement the interlocking relationships between right-wing nationalists, yakuza gangsters, and conservative political interests, with Kodama playing a starring role.

Despite being one of the leading figures of the postwar Japanese right wing, Kodama later claimed a personal relationship with Inejirō Asanuma, the chairman of the Japan Socialist Party who was assassinated by a right-wing youth in October 1960. In a 1975 dialogue with writer Shūsaku Endō published in his book Ware Kaku Tatakaeri (われかく戦えり), Kodama stated that he opposed the assassination: "I am opposed to it. Asanuma and I were on good terms. We often drank together. Asanuma personally was a fine person. That's why I said, 'Why did they do such a foolish thing? With this, they have eliminated the forum for dialogue between the Liberal Democratic Party and the Socialist Party.' Shortly afterwards, the Chūō Kōron incident occurred. At that time, I wrote in a newspaper, 'You mustn't do things like this. This is not the true form of the national movement,' and someone scolded me for it." According to the same account, Kodama is said to have provided money and information to Asanuma; both men were listed as patrons of professional wrestler Rikidōzan; and Asanuma allegedly used materials supplied by Kodama during the 1958 First FX fighter-aircraft selection controversy to criticize links between Grumman and Nobusuke Kishi.

In April 1961, Kodama formed his own sub-faction within the Zen'ai Kaigi called Seinen Shiso Kenkyukai (Society for the Study of Youth Ideology), which represented a hard core within the umbrella organization, mainly yakuza. At the end of the 1960s, the Shiso Kenkyukai split from Zen'ai Kaigi. Its members received military training and were used to intimidate unpopular journalists and book authors. One of the victims of this organization was the journalist Hisatomo Takemori (久友竹森), whose book entitled Black Money was not published after multiple threats.

In 1963, Kodama attempted to form a coalition of Japan's organized crime groups. However, Kazuo Taoka withdrew the Yamaguchi-gumi early on in talks, leaving Kodama with a Tokyo-centered group that would become known as the Kanto-kai. The organization was formed of seven yakuza groups (including the Sumiyoshi-kai and Matsuba-kai), with the purpose of fostering relations between the groups and promoting rightist goals. With Kodama unable to smooth over its internal conflicts, the Kanto-kai dissolved in January 1965.

Kodama was able to grow his fortune until the mid-1970s. He owned shares in Hisayuki Machii's Ginza nightclub empire, a shipping company, a baseball team, a film studio, and several sports magazines.

Kodama maintained close relations with LDP politicians, such as the yakuza-connected LDP Vice President Banboku Ōno, and his influence did not suffer until he was identified as the key kuromaku in the Lockheed Corporation bribery scandal.

== Lockheed scandal and final years ==
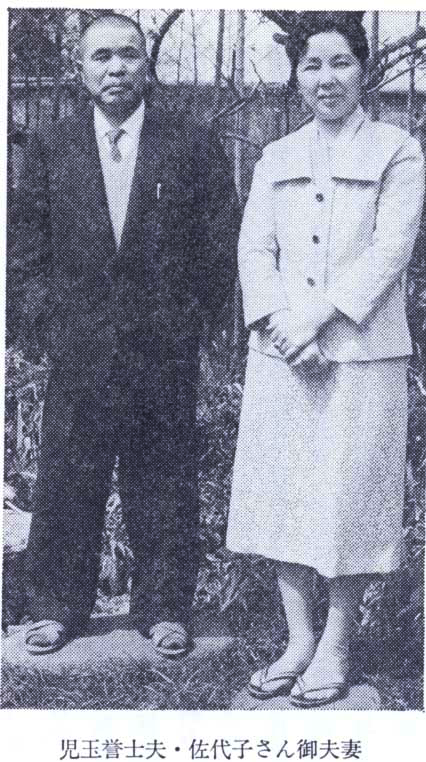
Kodama with his second wife, Sayoko

In the 1970s, it came to light that Kodama had played a role in the Lockheed L-1011 bribery scandal, which effectively ended his career as a right-wing fixer. Kodama had been a paid agent of Lockheed since 1958 and received US $7 million for his help in arranging the TriStar aircraft deal.

After the Lockheed scandal, disillusioned ultranationalist Roman Porno film actor Mitsuyasu Maeno attempted to assassinate Kodama by flying a Piper PA-28 Cherokee plane kamikaze-style into his mansion in Setagaya Ward's Todoroki. The attempt failed. Maeno hit the second floor of Kodama's mansion and died in the plane crash, but Kodama was unharmed in a different room. Kodama was recovering from a stroke at the time.

In June 1977, charges were brought against Kodama for tax evasion related to the scandal, but the trial was never completed before he died. Kodama died in his sleep of a stroke in Tokyo on January 17, 1984.

== Personal life ==
Kodama was married twice. A brief 1935 marriage ended in divorce. In 1940, Kodama married his second wife, Sayoko, with whom he had two children, a son and a daughter. Sayoko was her registered legal name, but she preferred to be called "Atsuko". Sayoko died in June 1960 of injuries suffered in a May 1960 car accident.

== In popular culture ==
The main character in 1979 Japanese film Nihon no Fixer, also known in its English title The Fixer, Yamaoka, was heavily based on Yoshio Kodama. The film itself centered the story of Yamaoka and his connection with Japanese Prime Minister Hirayama, who was loosely based on Kakuei Tanaka and his connection to the Lockheed bribery scandals in the early 1970s.
