= Bin Akao =

Japanese far-right politician and ultranationalist

- 赤尾 敏
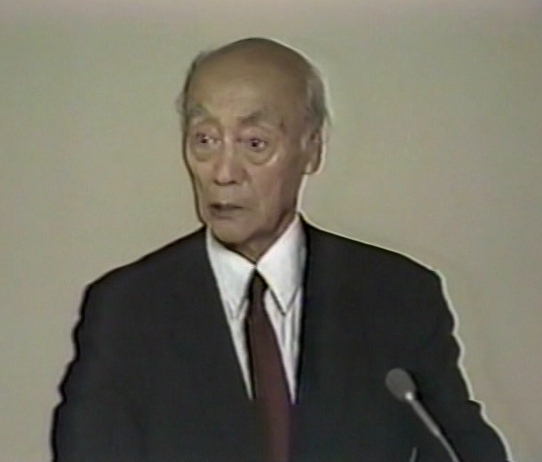
- Akao in 1986

Member of the House of Representatives
- In office 1 May 1942 – 18 December 1945
- Preceded by: Suzuki Bunji
- Succeeded by: Constituency abolished
- Constituency: Tokyo 6th

Personal details
- Born: 15 January 1899 Higashi, Nagoya, Japan
- Died: 6 February 1990 (aged 91) Toshima, Tokyo, Japan
- Party: Greater Japan Patriotic Party (1951–1990)
- Other political affiliations: Kenkokukai (1926–1945); IRAPA (1942–1943)
- Spouse: Fumie Akao
- Children: Six
- Relatives: Shiro Akao (brother); Yumi Akao (niece); Michihiko Akao (son)
- Education: Tsushima High School

Bin Akao (赤尾敏, Akao Bin; 15 January 1899 – 6 February 1990) was a Japanese far-right (uyoku) politician who served as a member of the House of Representatives of Japan during World War II. He was arrested 25 times for political activities.

Akao was cofounder and first president of the Kenkokukai and became one of the leading ultranationalists in Japan during the 1920s. Akao was elected to the House of Representatives as an independent in 1942 and espoused a unique type of Japanese nationalism characterized by support for the United States and opposition to the Pacific War. Akao founded and became the first president of the far-right Greater Japan Patriotic Party in 1951 and continued to adamantly champion pro-United States, pro-British, and radical anti-communist stances in post-war Japan. He was known for his fiery street corner speeches, often delivered from noise trucks adorned with the Japanese flag, American flag, and Union Jack. He never held a salaried job, entering politics in his early twenties, and continued street activism into his nineties.

Members of the Greater Japan Patriotic Party, both aged 17, were responsible for the 1960 assassination of Japan Socialist Party chairman Inejirō Asanuma and the Shimanaka incident. Akao, who was present at the Hibiya Public Hall when Otoya Yamaguchi fatally stabbed Asanuma, publicly praised the act; newsreel footage from Mainichi News recorded him saying the assassin "did well" and calling him "great," while a contemporary report quoted him describing Yamaguchi as "a paragon of Japanese virtue" and Asanuma’s death as "heaven-sent punishment." Akao was questioned and temporarily arrested in connection with both incidents, but was never charged with directing either attack.

== Early life ==
Bin Akao was born on 15 January 1899 in Higashi Ward, Nagoya, the son of a hardware dealer and liberal intellectual who had shifted from textiles to managing diverse businesses including hardware, charcoal sales, fishing, and ranching. As a child, Akao was sickly and contracted tuberculosis while a student at Aichi Third Junior High School (from which he later dropped out). Inspired by a teacher's story of Toyotomi Hideyoshi rising from humble origins to unify Japan, Akao dreamed of becoming prime minister through study and effort.

To aid his recovery, he was sent to manage a farm owned by his father on the island of Miyakejima. While on the island, Akao became acquainted with Inejirō Asanuma, the future chairman of the Japan Socialist Party, as well as Inejiro's distant relative Michio Asanuma, who would later become a member of Akao's Greater Japan Patriotic Party. On the farm, Akao sought to create a utopian society by implementing a primitive form of agrarian communism based on the ideals of the "New Village Movement" advocated by poet-philosopher Saneatsu Mushanokōji. In particular, the produce of the farm was distributed in equal shares to all workers on the farm, regardless of class or social standing. Novelist Rohan Koda sympathized with his ideals and met him. However, Akao's neighbors on the island felt threatened by his practices, and managed to swindle the farm from him through legalistic maneuvers. Disillusioned by the failure of his experiments with communism, Akao returned to the mainland and settled in Tokyo, where he began to dabble in socialism under the influence of Toshihiko Sakai, Hitoshi Yamakawa, Sakae Osugi, and Motoyuki Takabatake. He also engaged briefly in publishing. Akao was arrested and imprisoned for a speech critical of Japan's Emperor system after being conscripted into military service, and later for attempted extortion when demanding funds from local capitalists (receiving a sentence of one year and six months). While in prison, Akao became disillusioned with the left-wing movement in Japan (partly due to the attitude of former comrades) and soon abandoned left-wing politics as a whole.

== Ultranationalism ==
In 1926, Akao "converted" (tenkō suru) to ultranationalism while still imprisoned, embracing what he called "emperor system socialism," and began his foray into right-wing Japanese politics. Thereafter, he became a vocal opponent of the Soviet Union and communism. That year, Akao became cofounder and president (later also associated with roles such as secretary-general) of the Kenkokukai (National Foundation Society; later evolving into or associated with the Greater Japan Imperial Rule Association / Dai Nippon Kōdō Kai), a major ultranationalist organization of the 1920s that ultimately reached a nationwide membership of around 120,000. To counter May Day, he organized the successful "National Foundation Festival" (建国祭) with support from figures like Sadao Araki and Kiichirō Hiranuma. Akao was a close associate of legal scholar Shinkichi Uesugi, who allowed him to run the Kenkokukai from his home after the withdrawal of several prominent members left the organization without the means to fund their headquarters. Around 1933, the group proposed a new holiday, the "Plum Festival" (梅の節句), inspired by the Kigensetsu, complete with dolls honoring Emperor Jimmu at the top, though it did not gain popularity. He also served as a director of the International Anti-Communist League (Kokusai Hankyō Remmei).

One consistent aspect of Akao's thought was his respect for the power of the United States and Britain, having opposed the Pacific War from a nationalist perspective on the grounds that the United States was too powerful for Japan and therefore that fighting a war with it was foolhardy and played into Soviet communist strategy.

In the 1942 election, Akao ran for the Tokyo 6th district seat in the National Diet as a "non-recommended candidate," meaning he was not recommended by the single national political party, the Imperial Rule Assistance Association (IRAA). Nevertheless, Akao won the election and received the second most votes in Tokyo and the fourth most votes of anyone in Japan. Like other independent candidates, Akao was forced to join the Imperial Rule Assistance Political Association after winning his seat, but he was expelled from that organisation after publicly rebuking Prime Minister Hideki Tojo in June 1943.

== Post-war activism ==
Akao was defeated for re-election in 1945, and shortly thereafter was purged by the US military occupation of Japan as a ultranationalist leader. Akao's purge was reversed in 1951 as part of the Reverse Course and he vowed to return to elected office. To this end, Akao established a new political party, the Greater Japan Patriotic Party (GJPP; also rendered Great Japan Patriots' Party), which was ideologically virulently anti-communist and pro-American (and pro-British). By the mid-1980s the party claimed around 3,000 members. As a member of this party, Akao stood for several elected positions but never won after 1942, gaining a peak of 122,532 votes in the national at-large constituency for the House of Councillors in one election; overall he is reported to have run approximately 26 times across House of Representatives, House of Councillors, and Tokyo gubernatorial races. Increasingly, he seemed less interested in winning elections and more interested in stirring up debate, often running to gain legal speech opportunities during campaigns. He advocated abolishing the House of Councillors and urged voters to abstain or not vote for him. His use of noise trucks and street corner speechifying, famous at locations like Ginza's Sukiyabashi, was a model for later right-wing movements in Japan.

In 1960, during the Anpo protests against the US-Japan Security Treaty, Akao became convinced that Japan was on the verge of a communist revolution and sought to rally right-wing groups to engage in counter-protests. On 12 October 1960, Akao and over a dozen GJPP members attended a Japan Socialist Party rally at Hibiya Public Hall, securing seats near the front by purchasing scalped tickets. After 17-year-old party member (who had recently resigned) Otoya Yamaguchi fatally stabbed JSP chairman Inejirō Asanuma on stage, Akao remarked to someone nearby upon noticing limited bleeding, "Little boy, did you miss your chance?" (坊や、やりそこなったかな). Newsreel footage from "Mainichi News" captured him praising the act with "The boy did well, he's great" (坊やがよくやったもんだ、偉いもんだ) and welcoming a girl who had traveled to Tokyo intending to assassinate the Japan Teachers' Union chairman. Akao kept a portrait of Yamaguchi on a Shinto altar in his home and listed him among his heroes (alongside Chiang Kai-shek, Jesus Christ, and himself).

Akao had known Asanuma personally since their time on Miyakejima. According to Sawaki Kōtarō's Teroru no Kessan, the two men would exchange greetings when they passed each other on the street. Akao once described Asanuma as "a good person, which makes it regrettable to deal with him" (善人だから始末に悪い), a comment some sources suggest influenced Yamaguchi's motives alongside Asanuma's statement labeling American imperialism as the common enemy of Japan and China (as recorded in Yamaguchi's "Memorial of Severing the Traitor"). After the assassination, Akao telephoned Asanuma's wife Kyōko and Mutsuko Miki to express condolences or discuss the matter.

Yamaguchi and Kazutaka Komori (perpetrator of the Shimanaka Incident) were both recent or former GJPP members at the time of their attacks, leading to widespread speculation that Akao had incited or ordered them. Akao was questioned in the Asanuma case and arrested on 29 October for intimidation; the GJPP was designated an investigative target under the Subversive Activities Prevention Act in November. Following Yamaguchi's suicide in custody, Akao was released with authorities stating he had "no direct relation." In February 1961, after the Shimanaka Incident, he faced charges related to leaflet distribution and speech disruption at the Asanuma event but was released for lack of evidence; he was rearrested on 21 February for incitement to murder and attempted murder incitement tied to Shimanaka, but not indicted on 17 April due to insufficient proof. In 1960, police raided his home and seized "swastika posters" used for harassment of left-leaning figures.

Akao continued his activism and took to flying the American flag and the Union Jack on his noise trucks alongside the Hinomaru and Rising Sun Flag, and strongly supported the revised Security Treaty, the U.S.–Japan Alliance, and rearmament against communism. Akao was a strong supporter of South Korea, mainly for its anti-communism, and advocated close alliance between South Korea and Japan. Akao once stated that the Liancourt Rocks should be blown up as the dispute over the islets represented an obstacle to friendship between the two countries. In 1969, he was arrested at the second Shimoda Conference for attempting to disrupt proceedings while advocating rearmament. He also opposed rapprochement with the Soviet Union and the People's Republic of China.

In 1989, following the death of Emperor Hirohito, Akao ran for a seat in the House of Councillors for a 15th time (part of his overall ~26 candidacies), at the age of 90—one of the oldest candidates in Japanese election history. His home displayed large portraits of Emperor Meiji, Chiang Kai-shek, Shakyamuni Buddha, Jesus Christ, and himself.

== Later years and death ==
Akao continued his activism until late in life, delivering an estimated tens of thousands of street speeches (one later account by a relative cites over 30,000). He died of heart failure on 6 February 1990, at the age of 91, in Toshima, Tokyo.

== Personal life ==
Even amid poverty, he repeatedly ran for the House of Councillors elections and lost. From the indignation he felt during his pre-World War II leftist activities, he relentlessly denounced the contradictions of society, and his fanatical-seeming speeches in Nagoya dialect gained him a certain level of support among ordinary people. He was married to Fumie Akao and had six children; his brother Shiro founded the Akao aluminum business, and his niece Yumi Akao later became active in business and politics (including a 2017 candidacy).

As mentioned earlier, due to his relocation to Miyake Island for recuperation, he had a period of deep friendship with Asanuma, who was from Miyake Island, but as a result of the later Asanuma Incident, he ended up being resented by the people of Miyake Island as a whole, and it is said that Akao deeply regretted this.

The reason he chose Sukiyabashi as the location for his lifelong street preaching was that it was near the Asahi Shimbun Tokyo headquarters, which was in Yurakucho at the time, and one of his purposes was to criticize that company, as testified by Tetsuya Chikushi. On the day of Akao's death, Chikushi, a former reporter for the company, reported the obituary on his own program, recalling: "I have no reason to feel any affinity for the time when a terrorist was produced (the Asanuma Incident), but as someone who was called a 'fool' almost every day, I feel a nostalgia for his charming personality." Note that the company moved its Tokyo headquarters to Tsukiji in 1980, but Akao continued his street preaching at Sukiyabashi right up until shortly before his death. Later, when his niece Yumi ran in the 48th general election for the House of Representatives (2017), she gave a street speech at the corner of the Sukiyabashi intersection where her uncle Akao had once preached.

In a documentary program from the year before his death, when asked "What do you want most right now?", he replied: "I want money. Without money, you can't do anything. You know, from my youth I've been a dreamer and never thought about money. Now at 90, I've finally realized how important money is, but it's too late (laughs). Someone like my acquaintance of decades Ryōichi Sasakawa had thousands of billions, right? I have nothing. I'm not a materialist, but things are important. For example, humans die if they don't breathe air for 30 minutes. Even if consciousness is lost, as long as there's air, a person whether they have a soul or not can keep living. Air is a thing too, right? So things matter. The realistic representative of things is money. I have no property at all. My only asset is this one walking stick."

On 31 January 1965, when he went to Sasebo City in Nagasaki Prefecture to give a protest speech against the aircraft carrier Enterprise entering Sasebo Port, he was hit by a 16-year-old boy riding a motorcycle who was looking away while driving in the city. However, upon learning that the boy was riding the motorcycle for work, Akao said he was "impressed that at 16 years old he's already working" and did not pursue legal action.

During the forced execution at the Narita Airport site, Akao went to the scene and gave a critical speech against the opposition farmers engaged in the Sanrizuka Struggle. At that time, he became furious upon seeing a Rising Sun flag outlined in black on a farmers' broadcast tower built by the Sanrizuka-Shibayama Alliance Against the Airport, but when he found a genuine Rising Sun flag at another fortress, he said "This is good!".

It is said that until the very end, Akao kept large portraits of Emperor Meiji, Shakyamuni, Jesus Christ, and Chiang Kai-shek displayed in his room (alongside a self-portrait).

Akao authored works including Right-Wing Revolution or Left-Wing Coup d'État? (右翼革命か左翼クーデターか) and The Don Quixote of Patriotism (憂国のドン・キホーテ).
