= Chinese imperial guard =

Chinese imperial guard may refer to various units and organisations in Chinese history these include

- “Rapid as tigers” (huben; 虎賁)” hereditary soldiers and the “Feathered Forest” (yulin; 羽林) cavalrymen made up the imperial guards of the Army of the Han dynasty
- Imperial Guards (Tang dynasty), the imperial guards of the Tang dynasty
- Jinyiwei, the imperial guards of the Ming dynasty
- Imperial Guards (Qing China), the imperial guards of the Qing dynasty
  - Manchukuo Imperial Guards, the imperial guards of Manchukuo

== See also ==
- Kheshig, the imperial guards of the Mongols
- Manchukuo Imperial Guards, the imperial guards of Manchukuo
- 61889 Regiment, the People's Liberation Army united tasked with protecting the top leadership of the People's Republic of China
