= Kang Young-hoon =

Prime Minister of South Korea from 1988 to 1990

His Excellency Kang Young-Hoon 강영훈
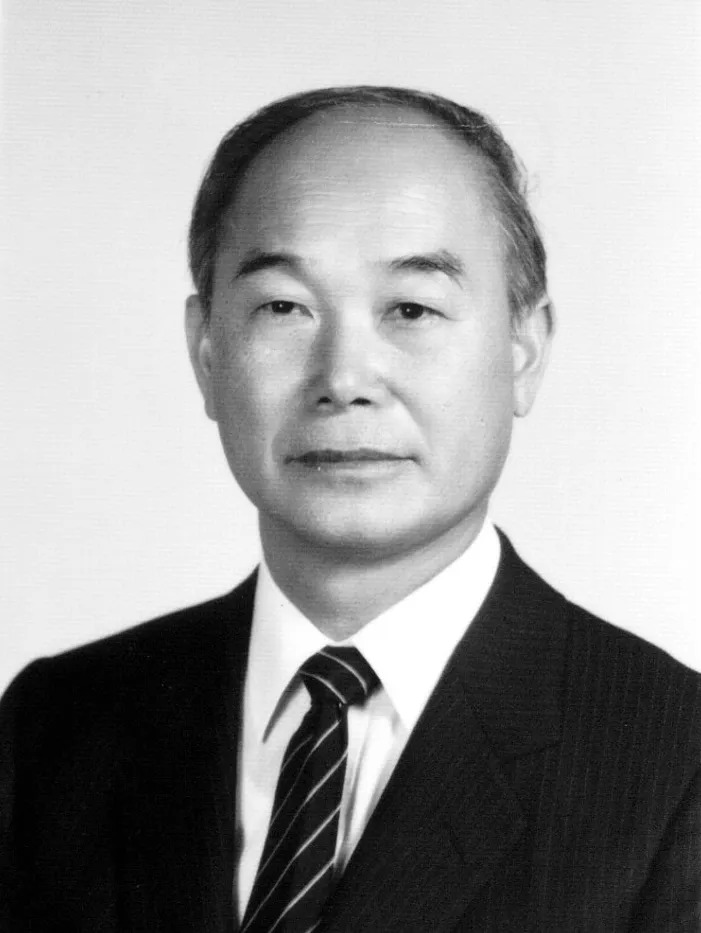

21st Prime Minister of South Korea
- In office 5 December 1988 – 15 December 1988 (acting)
- President: Roh Tae-woo
- Preceded by: Lee Hyun-jae
- Succeeded by: (Himself)
- In office 16 December 1988 – 26 December 1990
- President: Roh Tae-woo
- Preceded by: (Himself)
- Succeeded by: Ro Jai-bong

South Korean Ambassador to the United Kingdom and Ireland
- In office 1981–1984
- President: Chun Doo-hwan
- Succeeded by

South Korean Ambassador to the Vatican City
- In office 1984–1987
- President: Chun Doo-hwan
- Succeeded by

Personal details
- Born: 30 May 1922 Changsong County, Korea, Empire of Japan
- Died: 10 May 2016 (aged 93) Seoul, South Korea
- Party: Democratic Justice
- Education: Kenkoku University; University of Southern California (MA, PhD)

Korean name
- Hangul: 강영훈
- Hanja: 姜英勳
- RR: Gang Yeonghun
- MR: Kang Yŏnghun

Kang Young-Hoon (Korean: 강영훈, Japanese: 竹山 英勲, Takeyama Hidenori, 30 May 1922 – 10 May 2016) was a South Korean diplomat and politician who served as the prime minister of South Korea from 1988 to 1990 under President Roh Tae-woo.

Beginning his career in the military, Kang entered politics through the diplomatic foreign ministry before being elected to the National Assembly in 1987. He was appointed prime minister a year later in President Roh Tae-woo's first cabinet reshuffle. His two-year tenure as prime minister was marked by his rapprochement towards North Korea, under Roh's Nordpolitik policy. After leaving government, Kang went on to become president of the South Korean National Red Cross from 1991 to 1997.

== Early life and education ==
Kang was born in Changsong County, Heianhoku Province when Korea was under Japanese rule in 1922. He joined the National Defense Forces, a precursor to the Republic of Korea Army, shortly after his graduation from the Kenkoku University towards the end of World War II. He served as a division commander during the Korean War and a military attaché in the Embassy of South Korea, Washington, D.C. in 1952 before becoming director of the Joint Chiefs of Staff at the Ministry of National Defense in 1954. After a brief spell in the United States at the Army Command and General Staff College, Kang eventually reached the rank of Chungjang (Lieutenant General) and ended his career as the superintendent of the Korean Military Academy in 1961, the same year as a bloodless military coup that he opposed. He was detained in Seodaemun Prison for his role against the coup.

On his release from prison, Kang headed back to America, gaining a M.A. in international relations (1966) and a Ph.D. in political science (1973) from the University of Southern California. During his doctorate studies, he founded the Research Institute on Korean Affairs in Silver Spring, Maryland.

== Political career ==
Kang returned to South Korea in 1976, taking up the post of graduate school dean at the Hankuk University of Foreign Studies. His first foray into politics occurred in 1978 when he was appointed head of the Institute of Foreign Affairs and National Security, the training institute of the Ministry of Foreign Affairs. He then served as the ambassador to the United Kingdom and Ireland (1981–84), and the Vatican (1984–87). After the pro-democracy protests of 1987, Kang ran for election and was elected to the 13th National Assembly as a member of the ruling Democratic Justice Party.

== Prime minister ==
Kang was appointed prime minister by President Roh Tae-woo, who at the same time replaced 19 of 23 Cabinet members in a major shake up meant to separate himself from his disgraced predecessor, President Chun Doo-hwan. Kang was chosen, in part, because of his opposition to the Park Chung Hee-led coup of 1961. A moderate, Kang supported the democratic transition between the previous military regimes and civilian rule. During his tenure, political violence continued at universities throughout South Korea as groups labeled by the regime as "leftist radicals" advocated for the overthrow of the Government. After a rise in violence during the spring of 1989, Kang offered to follow opposition party demands to resign if he were held responsible for mishandling state affairs surrounding the violence.

=== Relations with North Korea ===
After months of negotiations, Kang took part in historic talks with his North Korean counterpart, Prime Minister Yon Hyong-muk. The highest-level contact between the two Governments since 1945, the exchange of visits by respective prime ministers were aimed at reducing tension on the peninsula and an eventual reunification. The first meeting occurred on 5–6 September 1990 in Seoul, permitting both sides to directly address their concerns on issues regarding disarmament, United States troop withdrawal, the release of political prisoners, visitation rights, and reunification; the tone remained amiable.

The prime ministers met a second time on 17–18 October 1990, this time in Pyongyang, culminating in a meeting with Kim Il Sung. After initially maintaining the positive tone of the earlier meeting, tensions rose as both sides dropped their earlier civil tone and accused each other of bad faith. Both sides became suspicious that the other was using the talks to further its political agenda; Kang accused the North Koreans of "doing things that foment division and further put off peace" as well as using the talks to interfere with South Korean internal affairs while North Korean representatives criticized South Korea's suggestions to increase trade, cultural and humanitarian exchanges. Despite a lack of mutual agreement on substantive issues, the two sides agreed to another round of talks in Seoul from 11 to 14 December. Even with the dismissive position of North Korean officials, soccer matches and folk-music-concert exchanges did take place in the subsequent months. The third meeting in December failed to come to a compromise over a proposed "declaration of non-aggression," which had been on the table since September; however both sides agreed yet again to continue talks the following February.

== Post-political career ==
On 27 December 1990 Roh replaced Kang in another cabinet shuffle intended to improve his party's image before the following year's elections. Replaced by Ro Jai-bong, a chief aide, Kang had reportedly asked to retire from public life. Shortly after his replacement, he went on a diplomatic tour of the Middle East to canvass support for South Korea's membership to the United Nations. He went on to serve as president of the National Red Cross (1991–1997), an organization that played a major role in negotiations between South and North Korea, during a period where the north was suffering a dire famine. In 1995, he has created an honorary Knight Commander of the Order of the British Empire (KBE) by Queen Elizabeth II. Kang subsequently served as chairman of the Sejong Institute, and as chairman of the United Nations Environment Programme (UNEP), Korea Committee. Kang died on 10 May 2016 at the age of 93 of natural causes at the Seoul National University Hospital 20 days shortly before his 94th birthday. Kang was survived by his wife and three children.

Political offices
Preceded by Lee Hyun-jae	Prime Minister of South Korea; 1988–1990	Succeeded by Ro Jai-bong
