= Manchukuo Imperial Guards =

1933–1945 guards unit of Japan's puppet state

- 禁衛隊
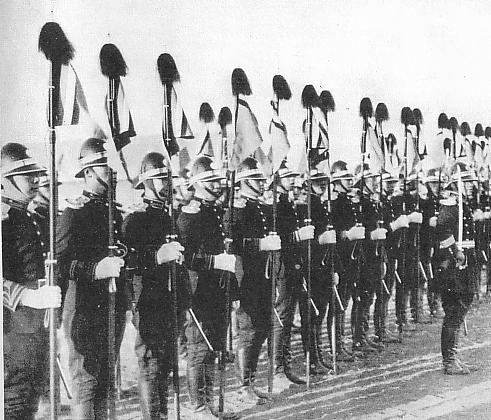
- Guardsmen in ceremonial uniform, 1934
- Active: 1933–1945
- Country: Manchukuo
- Allegiance: Emperor of Manchukuo
- Type: Imperial guard
- Size: 200 men (initial size)
- Garrison/HQ: Xinjing, Manchukuo
- Engagements: Counterinsurgency in Manchuria; Soviet invasion of Manchuria

Insignia
- Five-colored star

The Manchukuo Imperial Guards (Chinese: 禁衛隊; pinyin: Jīn wèiduì, Japanese: 禁衛隊, romanized: Kin'eitai) were an elite unit (special operations capable) of the Manchukuo armed forces created in 1933. It was charged with the protection of the Kangde Emperor, the imperial household, and senior members of the Manchukuo civil government. Their garrison and headquarters were situated in the capital of Xinjing, adjacent to the Imperial Palace.

== History ==
The Manchukuo Imperial Guards were inspired by the Imperial Guards of the Qing dynasty and patterned after the Imperial Guard of Japan. Its 200 members were selected from candidates of ethnic Manchu backgrounds, and were trained independently of the Manchukuo Imperial Army or the Japanese Kwantung Army. Although largely a ceremonial force, the company received the latest firearms and also carried Japanese-style swords (Japanese: 軍刀, romanized: Guntō) as dress weaponry. Their uniforms were grey or black with silver or gold insignia, with a five-color, five pointed star on their helmets and kepis.

An independent brigade called the Jing'an Guerilla Unit (Chinese: 靖安游擊隊; pinyin: Jìng'ān yóujīduì) was formed for use in clandestine operation, commando style raids, covert operation, intelligence gathering, special operations, special reconnaissance, and tracking targets during the Pacification of Manchukuo. It was effective in combat, having participated in the Ki Feng-lung District Subjugation in November 1932 and anti-bandit Honghuzi operations. The ceremonial unit was part of the corps.

The Manchukuo Imperial Guards fought their last battles during the Soviet invasion of Manchuria and ceased to exist at the conclusion of the Soviet–Japanese War.

== See also ==
- Imperial Guards (Qing dynasty)
- Imperial Guard (Japan)
