= Kenkokukai =

Japanese secret society (founded 1926)

The Kenkokukai (建国会/建國會; National Foundation Society) was a Japanese political organisation founded by Bin Akao in April 1926. It was an anti-communist organisation, strongly influenced by the National Socialism of Motoyuki Takabatake.

The predecessor of this association was the steering committee for the National Foundation Festival (建国祭), which was organized in opposition to May Day. It proclaimed its object to be "the creation of a genuine people's state based on unanimity between the people and the emperor". At its height, the organization reached a nationwide membership of around 120,000.

== People ==
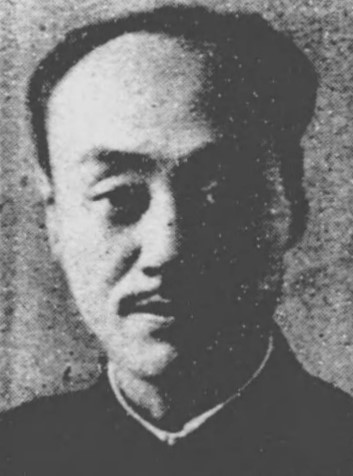
Bin Akao, founder of Kenkokukai.

=== Founders ===
- President (理事長): Bin Akao, a right-wing anarchist from Nagoya, Pro-British and Pro-American political activist during and after World War II
- Chairperson (会長): Shinkichi Uesugi (professor of constitutional law at Imperial University of Tokyo and main advocate of Tenno Shukensetsu or Theory of Emperor Sovereignty)
- Secretary general (書記長): Tatsuo Tsukui [ja] (national socialist activist, a disciple of Takabatake)
- Motoyuki Takabatake, a national socialist theorist known for the first full Japanese (and east-asian) translation of Karl Marx's Das Kapital

=== Advisers and patron ===
- Adviser (顧問): Prime Minister Kiichirō Hiranuma
- Adviser (顧問): Mitsuru Toyama, Founder of Black Ocean Society
- Gen. Sadao Araki
- Hidejirō Nagata

== Goals ==
Its statist program included the demand for "the state control of the life of the people in order that among Japanese people there should not be a single unfortunate nor unfully-franchised individual". It was at one time in favor of universal suffrage.

The Kenkokukai worked in close concert with the police to break the miners strike in Tochigi, and other strikes by factory workers in Kanegafuchi, tramway workers in Tokyo, and tenant farmers in Gifu Prefecture. Uesugi soon withdrew in 1927, and Takabatake supporters left following his death in 1928. This left the organization with only around 10,000 members. Tōyama Mitsuru (頭山満) of the Black Dragon Society (黒龍会) was appointed honorary chairperson, and Nagata, a former Police Chief, vice-chair. Others of this new influx included Ikihara, Kida, and Sugimoto. Akao was director of the league, which organized gangs of strike breakers and in 1928 bombed the Soviet embassy. Their paper Nipponshugi was virulently anti-communist with slogans such as "Death to Communism, to Russian Bolshevism, and to the Left parties and workers' unions".
