= Tsushima High School =

- 愛知県立津島高等学校

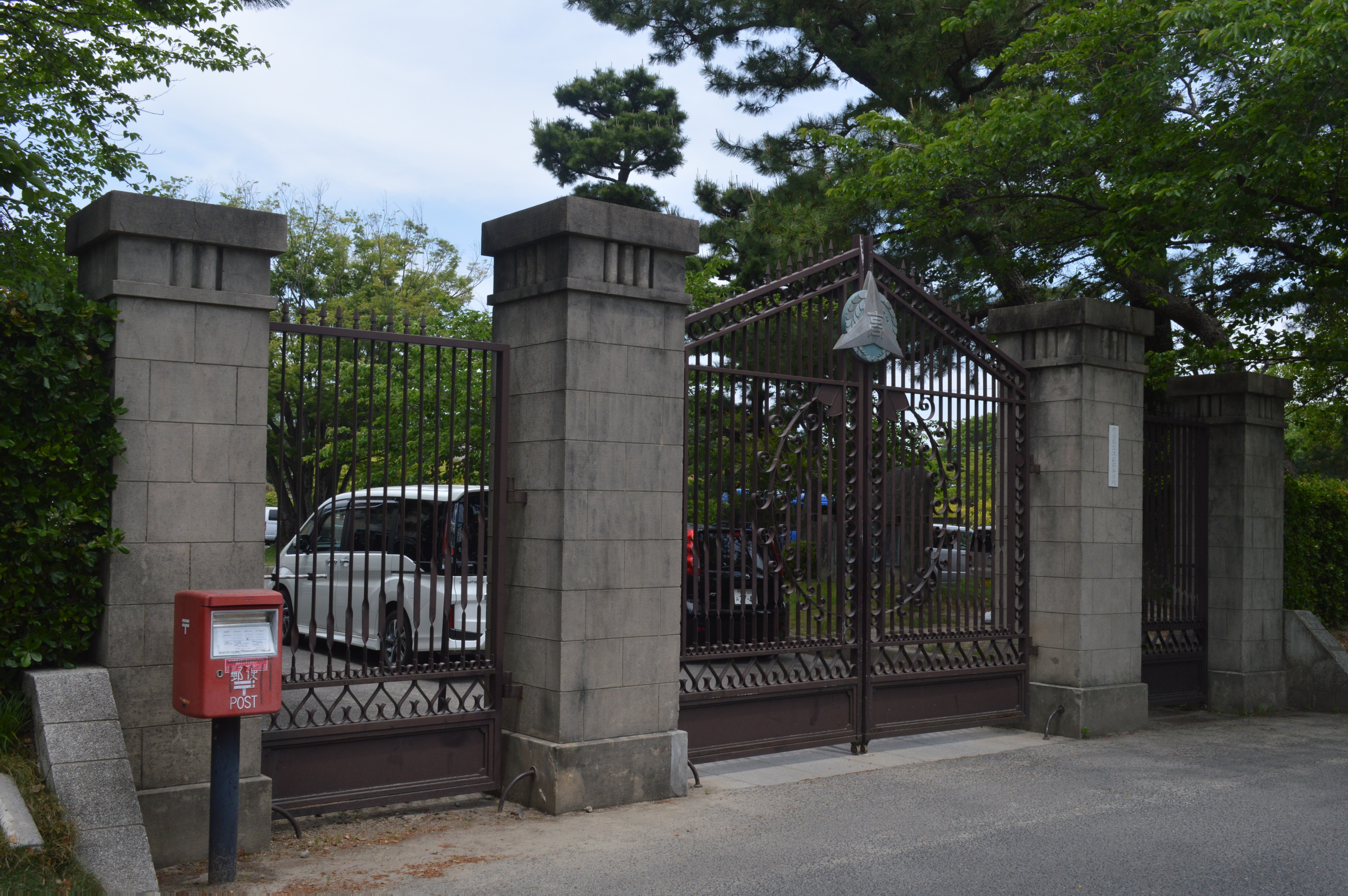
- Main gate, 2019

Location
- 3-80 Miyagawacho, Tsushima Aichi Prefecture 496-0853; Japan; 35.1661°N 136.7150°E

Information
- Type: High school
- Established: 1900; 126 years ago
- Website: Official website

Alternative view of the main gate

Tsushima High School 愛知県立津島高等学校 (Aichi kenritsu tsushima kōtōgakkō aichi kenritsu tsushima kōtōgakkō) is a high school located in Tsushima in Aichi Prefecture, Japan. It was founded in January 1900, originally as a junior high school.
