= Changchun University =

- 长春大学
- Type: Public
- Established: 1946
- President: Pan Fulin (潘福林)
- Location: Changchun, Jilin, China
- Campus: Urban
- Website: http://www.ccu.edu.cn/

Changchun University (simplified Chinese: 长春大学; traditional Chinese: 長春大學; pinyin: Chángchūn Dàxué) is a multi-disciplinary university in Changchun, Jilin. It includes three campuses all together covering 1,129,000 square meters. Established in 1946, Changchun University has trained more than 40,000 undergraduate students.

The university consists of 17 institutions, offers 46 undergraduate degree courses, and represents over 13,000 students. There are over 707 instructors in the university, including 110 professors and 318 associate professors. At present, Changchun University has three national-level science research centers, one provincial key academic discipline, one provincial key science lab, and two provincial key humanities and social sciences research bases.

The university's education scope covers philosophy, economics, law, education, literature, history, science, engineering, agriculture, medicine, and management.
