= Tetsuya Chikushi =

Japanese journalist

- 筑紫 哲也
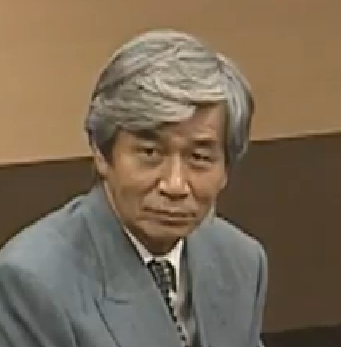
- Born: June 23, 1935; Ōita Prefecture, Japan
- Died: November 7, 2008 (aged 73); Tokyo, Japan
- Occupations: Journalist, news anchor

Tetsuya Chikushi (Japanese: 筑紫 哲也, Chikushi Tetsuya; 23 June 1935 – 7 November 2008) was a Japanese journalist, TV presenter and news anchor.

== Career ==
Chikushi was born in Hita, Ōita on 23 June 1935. He graduated from Waseda University's school of political science and economics, and joined the Asahi Shimbun newspaper in 1959 as a reporter.

He worked for the Asahi Shimbun's political news department, Okinawa bureau, and Washington bureau, before being appointed as managing editor of the Asahi Journal magazine.

He later resigned from the Asahi Shimbun to become the anchorman of TBS's News 23 late-night news programme in October 1989.

He left TBS's News 23 in May 2007 after announcing on air that he was suffering from lung cancer. However he returned in October, although he appears irregularly. Finally on 28 March 2008, he permanently left News 23.

He died of lung cancer on 7 November 2008 at a hospital in Tokyo, aged 73. He was a guest professor of Waseda University and Ritsumeikan University.

== See also ==
- Tokyo Broadcasting System Television
- Aum Shinrikyo
