= Five Races Under One Union (Manchukuo) =

National motto in Manchukuo

- The National Flag of Manchukuo

Chinese name
- Traditional Chinese: 五族協和
- Simplified Chinese: 五族协和
Transcriptions
Standard Mandarin
- Hanyu Pinyin: wǔzú xiéhé
- Bopomofo: ㄨˇㄗㄨˊㄒㄧㄝˊㄏㄜˊ

Korean name
- Hangul: 오족협화
- Hanja: 五族協和
Transcriptions
- Revised Romanization: O jok hyeop hwa

Japanese name
- Kanji: 五族協和
- Hiragana: ごぞくきょうわ
Transcriptions
- Romanization: Gozoku Kyōwa

Five Races Under One Union (Chinese: 五族協和, Japanese: 五族協和) was used as a national motto in Manchukuo, for the five ethnic groups of the Manchus, the Japanese, the Han Chinese, the Mongols and the Koreans. It was similar to the "Five Races Under One Union" (Chinese: 五族共和) motto used by the Republic of China, for the Han, Manchus, Hui, Mongols and Tibetans, but the third of the four Chinese characters was changed from Togetherness (共) to Cooperation (協). Both mottoes were pronounced the same "Go zoku kyōwa" in Japanese.

== Background ==
Ethnic groups in Manchuria, circa 1939
1. Manchukuoans (including Han and Manchu) (92.1%)
2. Japanese (including the Kwantung Army) (2.80%)
3. Koreans (2.50%)
4. Mongols (2.50%)
5. White Russians (0.10%)

Prior to the Japanese invasion of Manchuria, Northeast China had always been highly ethnically diverse. Policies of the Qing dynasty in particular encouraged multiculturalism. On the eve of the invasion, the northeast's diverse population included Koreans, Han Chinese, Japanese, Manchus, and Mongols living in the Western plains. There were also White Russians, primarily found in Harbin, Germans, Jews, Ukrainians, Poles, Crimean Tatars, and smaller numbers of British, American, French, and Italian residents. During the 1920s, some White Russians designated themselves as Chinese in censuses.

In 1930, the population of the region which would become Manchukuo was around 30 million. In 1939, there were 37 million Manchu and Han people, 1,130,000 Japanese, a number which included about 300,000 Kwantung Army personnel, around one million of both Koreans and Mongols, and 38,000 White Russians. There were also approximately 2,000 nikkei Japanese, Japanese people who had emigrated to Hawaii and the United States, who had then moved to Manchukuo.

Other minorities included Oroqen people, who lived in forest regions, and Hui people. Some ethnic minorities had been banned from entering China under Qing rule.

Russian immigrants had become a notable minority in Northeastern China in the years following the Russian Revolution. Harbin became a home city for many fleeing revolutions and conquest in Europe, which also included Poles. During this time, Russian-language newspapers were published, while Christianity, both Russian Orthodoxy and Catholicism, had become more common, requiring the construction of new churches. There was also a minority of Polish Jews, who constructed synagogues.

However, following decades of intermarriage between Manchu and Han people, primarily due to varying dynamics of ethnic and economic privilege between the two groups, the clear lines between Manchu and Han peoples were unclear. Following persecution during the Republic of China's rule, by the 1930s, many Manchu spoke Mandarin and identified as Han Chinese. Thus, on the eve of the invasion, 80% of the Northeast China was Han. There was also significant immigration, with between 500,000 and 2,000,000 Han people moving to Northeast China each year in the early 20th century.

Few Japanese people lived in Northeast China prior to the Japanese invasion of Manchuria. Japanese laborers had begun moving abroad in the 1880s, looking for work. By 1929, approximately 240,000 Japanese workers had moved to the region. The majority of these workers were concentrated in industrial fields, with few working agrarian jobs. This Japanese population made up less than 1% of the total population.

During this time, Confucianism was becoming controversial among Hand and Manchu peoples. The Manchus who had supported the Qing dynasty were advocates of Confucianism, while many Han, who were adopting modernist ideas, opposed it.

== Japanese rule ==
Following the Mukden incident, the Empire of Japan invaded Northeast China and established Manchukuo as a puppet state. Drawing on the history of diversity in the region, the national identity of this new state was framed as embodying a multi-ethnic figure bound together by mutual loyalty to the monarch, Puyi. The idea of Five Races Under One Union was born from this. However, the titular five races excluded other significant groups, such as White Russians in Harbin and other minorities. It also privileged Japanese people, who made up less than 3% of the population, even after significant migration, but held military and political power. Despite the Five Races Under One Union not mentioning other national minorities, they were mentioned in the Manchukuoan declaration independence, which said, "There should be no differences among all those who live within this new territory. In addition to Han Chinese, Manchus, Mongols, Japanese, and Koreans, people of any other nationality will be treated equally with others, as long as they wish to reside permanently in Manchuku."

Furthermore, while the Five Races policy claimed to support both Manchu and Han people, due to many Manchu instead identifying as Han, the lines between the two groups were blurred, which led to them being grouped together often, such as in police reports. However, Manchukuo was still supported by some Manchu people, who wished to restore the Manchu-led Qing dynasty. Initially, there was also support from Han and Mongol soldiers.

Following the invasion, Japanese people were encouraged to immigrate to Manchuko. Even poor Japanese immigrants were able to use the existing Japanese rule to empower themselves, such as buying land from native Han or Manchu people for cheap. Some Japanese people living in Manchukuo identified as Manchukuoan.

In order to formalize the Five Races policy, passports to be used as identification were issued by the Manchukuoan government along such lines. Many Japanese people in Manchuko held dual citizenship. However, ethnic groups not included in the Five Races, such as White Russians and other Europeans, were not issued passports, leaving such groups stateless. Furthermore, most rural Han Chinese and Koreans never obtained passports to begin with, which made the system largely irrelevent. The absence of mandatory passports weakened Manchukuo’s ability to enforce a cohesive national identity or legal jurisdiction, leaving the legal status of many residents uncertain.

Most people living in Manchukuo also identified with other nations, such as China, Japan, or Korea. Thus, the lack of strict political enforcement failed to create a cohesive national identity among the Five Groups.

While the Manchukuo government claimed to support equality, this was not the case in practice, as Japanese people were favored, Manchu and Han people were discriminated against, and Koreans faced the harshest discrimination. However, among Koreans at the time, Manchukuo was seen as a more desirable place to live compared to Korea under Japanese rule. Between 1932 and 1940, 720,000 Koreans moved from Korea to Manchukuo. Among the Koreans who fled to Manchukuo during this were future presidents of South Korea Park Chung Hee, Choi Kyu-hah, and Chun Doo-hwan. Korean migration to Manchukuo was encouraged by the Japanese government, who was afraid that an influx of Korean laborers into Japan could cause economic troubles. In 1944, the Korean population in Manchukuo had reached almost two million.

Europeans, especially White Russians, were excluded entirely from Manchukuoan racial policies. However, In the 1940s, books by Russians living in Manchukuo began to be translated into Japanese as part of the focus on ethnic harmony. White Russians and other Europeans living in Harbin were also often recruited to take part in staged anti-communist rallies. Harbin, the city with the largest European immigrant population in Manchukuo, frequently staged such anti-communist rallies. Rallies in Harbin and other cities also frequently included Muslims, such as the Hui people.

This focus on ethnic diversity also played into greater claims made by the Empire of Japan. Manchukuo was included in the Greater East Asia Co-Prosperity Sphere, where it was mentioned as a model of Confucian governance and pan-Asian unity.

=== King's Way ===
One of the methods the Manchukuo government attempted to use to create a national Manchukuoan identity was Wangdao (Chinese: 王道, also known as the King's Way. This was a Confucian ideology, rooted in traditional beliefs around governance. The ruling Japanese government used the King's Way to argue that the Kuomintang and the Chinese Communist Party had both lost the Mandate of Heaven by deviating from Confucian values.

In 1935, at the Conference on Confucian Studies in Tokyo, which was attended by Manchukuoan scholars, as well as Puyi, the King's Way was adopted as the leading form of governance. The King's Way was also used in propaganda, national festivals, and state ceremonies, in order to create a unified national identity. These festivals integrated Confucian teachings and encouraged incorporation of Confucianist beliefs in education, presenting them as a shared East Asian moral standard. The Manchukuo government also established Confucian studies groups in every country office. Confucian shrines were built in every county and religious services were held twice a year. Elements of Shintoism were integrated into Manchukuoan Confucianism, such as moments for dead soldiers.

According to Nobuyoshi Mutō, "“Our kingly way is to guide the policy of Manchukuo in a spirit identical with the glorious regime of benevolence and justice peculiar to our imperial destiny to control the moral and spiritual advance of the world.”

The use of Confucianism by the Manchukuo government was heavily criticized. It has been described as “the most negative example of Confucianism in over 2,000 years.” However, the King's Way did have some supporters within Manchukuo, particularly among upper class Han and Manchu people.

== Flag ==
The national flag of Manchukuo was meant to represent the Five Races policy. The colors resembled that of the Beiyang government's flag. Since Manchukuo was a Manchu kingdom, the color which represented them, yellow, was dominant. Red represented the Japanese, blue the Han, white the Mongols, and black the Koreans. It was also said that the colors represented different directions, with blue standing for east, red for south, white for west, black for north and the yellow for central.

Manchuria Aviation Company roundel, 1931–1945

War ensign of Manchukuo, 1932–1945

Manchukuo Army insignia, 1932–1945

Manchukuo Air Force roundel, 1937–1945

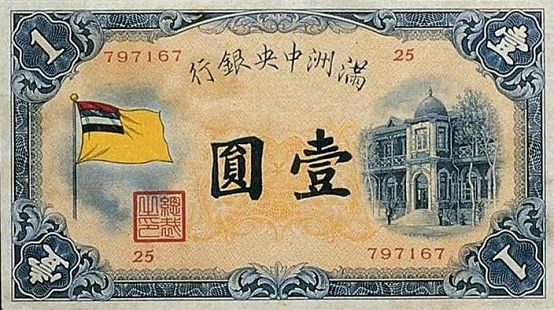
Central Bank of Manchou 1 yuan banknote, 1932

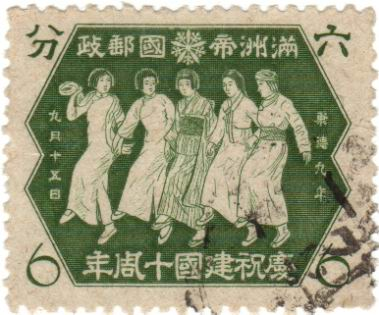
Commemorative stamp propagating the "Concord of Nationalities"

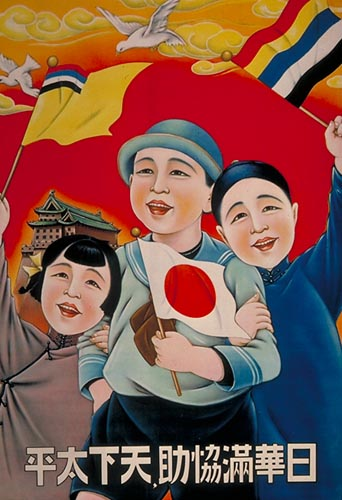
"With the cooperation of Japan, China, and Manchukuo the world can be in peace," 1935

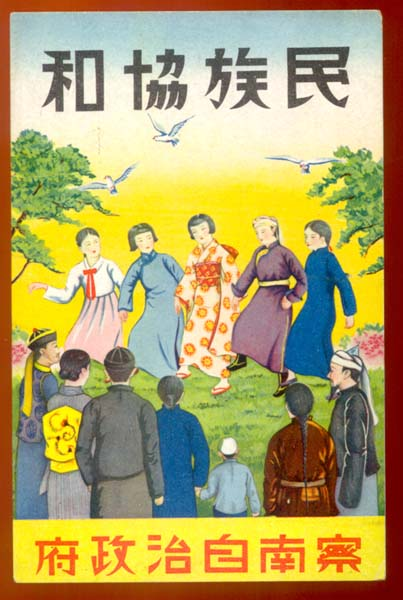
South Chahar Autonomous Government propaganda, c. 1937–1939

== Aftermath ==
Due to the role that traditional Confucian values had played in the Five Races policy, following the demise of the Manchukuo government, Confucianism experienced a decline in East Asia. In its place, reformist ideologies, such as those of the Nationalist and Communist governments, were embraced instead.

Following the end of Japanese rule in China, many lower class Japanese people who had emigrated returned to Japan.
