= Uesugi Shinkichi =

Japanese political philosopher and legal scholar (1878–1929)

- 上杉 慎吉
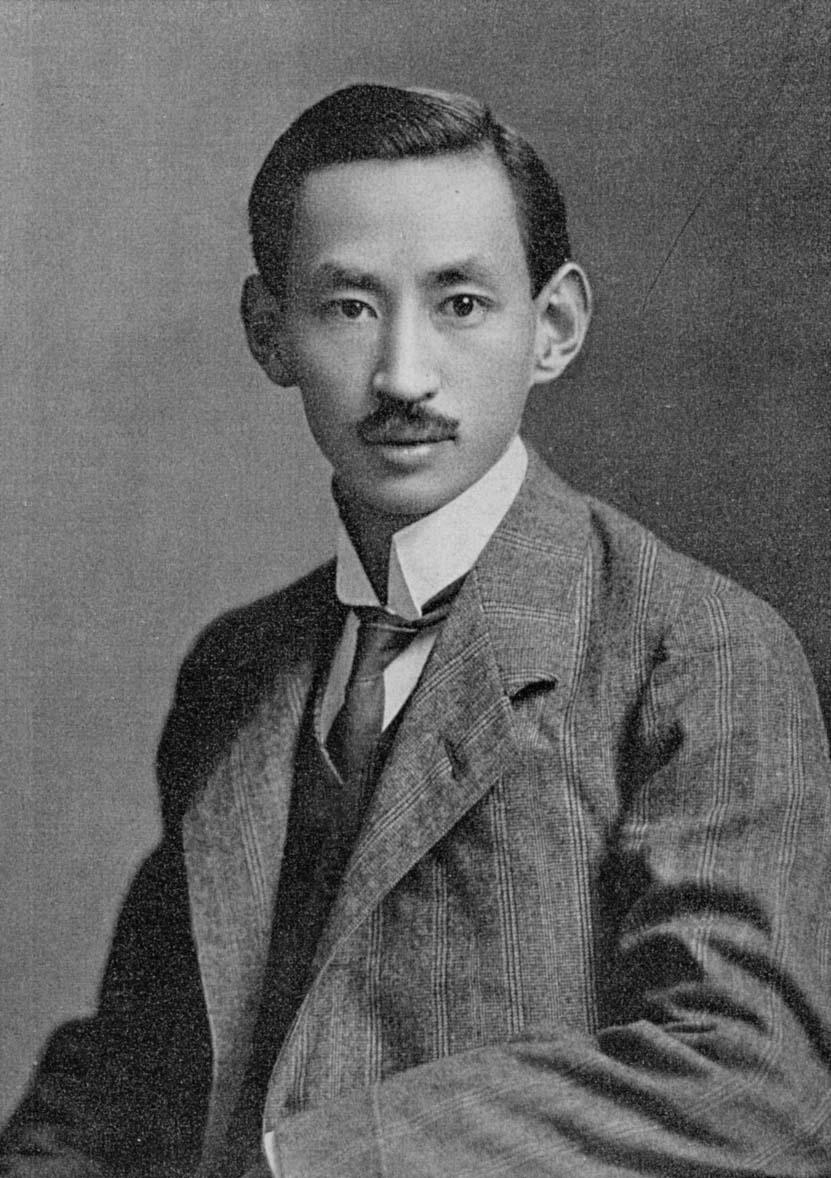
- Uesugi Shinkichi in 1910
- Born: August 18, 1878; Fukui town, Asuwa District, Fukui Prefecture, Empire of Japan
- Died: April 7, 1929 (aged 50); Tokyo City, Tokyo Prefecture, Empire of Japan
- Occupation: Professor of Constitutional Law

Philosophical work
- Era: 20th-century philosophy: Meiji Era; Taishō Era; Shōwa Era
- Region: Eastern philosophy: Japanese philosophy
- School: Japanese nationalism
- Language: Japanese
- Main interests: Political philosophy

Uesugi Shinkichi (上杉 慎吉, Uesugi Shinkichi; August 18, 1878 – April 7, 1929) was a political philosopher and legal scholar who was active in Meiji, Taishō, and early Shōwa period Japan. One of the founding figures of right-wing Shintō ultranationalism, he helped sow the seeds for radical right-wing activism in 1930s Japan, although he died shortly before a wave of assassinations and assassination attempts that his ideas helped inspire.

== Early life and education ==
Uesugi Shinkichi was born in Fukui town, Asuwa District, Fukui Prefecture (Present-day Fukui city on August 18, 1878. He attended Tokyo Imperial University, where he studied under Hozumi Yatsuka and graduated with a degree in law in 1903, joining the faculty in the School of Law that same year.

== Career ==
In the early years of his career as an educator, Uesugi followed his teacher Hozumi in adhering closely to continental European (especially German) theories of the state, and originally subscribed to Minobe Tatsukichi's "Emperor Organ Theory" that sovereignty resided in the state and the Emperor was merely the highest organ of the state.

However, Uesugi's views began to change during his stay in Europe from 1906 to 1909, where he studied under Georg Jellinek at the University of Heidelberg. Ironically, it was precisely because Jellinek so strongly urged him to accept German state theory that Uesugi began to turn away from western state theory and European political philosophy.

Beginning in 1911, following his return to Japan, Uesugi launched a sustained series of attacks against Minobe's Emperor Organ Theory, which up until that time held broad, mainstream acceptance. In these attacks, Uesugi accused Minobe of violating Japan's sacred kokutai ("national essence") by arguing that the Japanese Emperor was subordinate to the state. In 1913, Uesugi formed a group called the Tokagakkai ("Paulownia Flower Society") to defend the kokutai against Minobe's Emperor Organ Theory and to work for the eradication of all political parties. The Tokagakkai eventually expanded to include more than 200 members, including radical Shintō ultranationalists, military officers, and elite government bureaucrats.

In later years, Uesugi founded the Keirin Gakumei ("Society for the Study of Statesmanship") with National Socialist Takabatake Motoyuki, and after Uesugi and Takabatake had a falling out, focused his activities around another right-wing ultranationalist society he founded called the "Seven Lives Society" (after the famous last words of 14th century samurai Kusunoki Masashige). These two societies became breeding grounds for a new wave of right-wing activism in the early 1930s including numerous assassinations and attempted assassinations, and inspired future groups such as the League of Blood, many of whose members had started out as members of Uesugi's societies.

In his role as a professor of law at the elite Tokyo Imperial University, Uesugi also trained and mentored many notable right-wing politicians and political activists who were students of his, including future prime ministers Nobusuke Kishi, Eisaku Satō, and Takeo Fukuda, and political philosopher Masahiro Yasuoka. Uesugi was so impressed by Kishi that he sought to make Kishi his successor as a professor in the University of Tokyo Faculty of Law, but Kishi declined. He similarly tried to persuade Fukuda to stay on a few years later, but Fukuda also declined. Uesugi also maintained a close mentoring relationship with Bin Akao, one of the most virulent right-wing ultranationalists of the prewar period, and served as honorary president of Akao's Kenkokukai ("National Foundation Association").

Uesugi died of complications from pleurisy on April 7, 1929.
