= Motoyuki Takabatake =

Japanese Marxist and later National Socialist

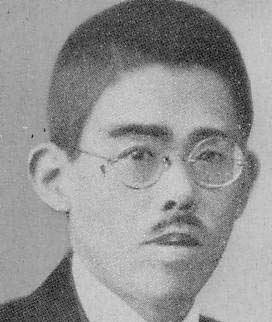
- Born: January 4, 1886; Gunma, Japan
- Died: December 23, 1928 (aged 42)
- Other name: Motoyuki Takahata
- Known for: First Japanese translation of Das Kapital
- Movement: Japanese Marxism

Motoyuki Takabatake (Japanese: 高畠素之, Hepburn: Takabatake Motoyuki; 1886 – 1928) was a Japanese journalist and political activist who completed the first full Japanese translation of Karl Marx's Das Kapital.

In his youth he became a member of the small Japanese anarchist movement. During the Russian Revolution however, he began to lean in support of state socialism. Where prominent Marxists saw the state in Soviet Russia as a temporary and necessary evil needed to construct communist society, Takabatake welcomed the revolution precisely because it would lead to a strong centralized state. This led to tensions between him and other Japanese Marxists, with Takabatake becoming one of the first theoreticians of socialist nationalism in Japan. He completed the first Japanese translation of Das Kapital in 1924, though by 1926 he had left Marxism entirely, establishing the fascist Kenkokukai organization, and had prepared to establish a National Socialist Party before his abrupt death in 1928.
