= Political extremism in Japan =

While Japan's political mainstream has the CDP and the LDP as dominant forces, there is political extremism to the left and the right.

Neither left- nor right-wing extremists managed to wrest power from the LDP in post-war history, but they managed to influence public opinion on certain topics. These include foreign relations of Japan, the role of the military, territorial disputes, and national symbolism. On some topics, like the Yasukuni Shrine, all three elements play a role.

The public and the government appear to tolerate certain forms of public disorder as inherent to a properly functioning democracy. Demonstrations usually follow established forms. Groups receive legal permits and keep to assigned routes and areas. Placards and bullhorns are used to express positions. Traffic is sometimes disrupted, and occasional shoving battles between police and protesters results. But arrests are rare and are generally made only in cases involving violence.

Although members of extremist groups represent only a minute portion of the population and present no serious threat to the government, authorities are concerned about the example set by the groups' violence, as well as by particular violent events. Violent protests by radicals also occur in the name of fringe causes without meaningful public support. Occasional clashes between leftist factions and rightist factions have injured participants.

== The Birth of the New Left ==
According to the 1989 Asahi Nenkan, there were 14,400 activist members of the "extreme left wing" organized into five major "currents" (ryū) and twenty-seven or twenty-eight different factions. Total membership was about 35,000. New-left activity focused on the New Tokyo International Airport at Narita-Sanrizuka (Sanrizuka Struggle). In the early 1970s, radical groups and normally conservative farmers formed a highly unusual alliance to oppose expropriation of the latter's land for the airport's construction. Confrontations at the construction site, which pitted thousands of farmers and radicals against riot police, were violent and killed dozens people. Although the airport was completed and began operations during the 1980s, the resistance continued, on a reduced scale. Radicals attempted to halt planned expansion of the airport by staging guerrilla attacks on those directly or indirectly involved in promoting the plan. By 1990 this activity had resulted in some deaths. There were also attacks against places associated with the emperor. In January 1990, leftists fired homemade rockets at imperial residences in Tokyo and Kyoto.

== Japanese Red Army ==
In terms of terrorist activities, the most important new-left group was the Japanese Red Army (Nihon Sekigun). Formed in 1969, it was responsible for, among other acts, the hijacking of a domestic Japan Airlines jet to Pyongyang in 1970 and the 1972 Lod Airport massacre. It also participated in the Laju incident, an attack on a Shell oil refinery in Singapore in 1974, and seized the French embassy in The Hague that same year and the United States and Swedish embassies in Kuala Lumpur in 1975. In 1977 the Japanese Red Army hijacked a Japan Airlines jet over India in a successful demand for a US$6 million ransom and the release of six inmates in Japanese prisons.

Its activists developed close connections with international terrorist groups, including Palestinian movements like the Popular Front for the Liberation of Palestine. The Japanese Red Army also had close ties with the Kim Il-Sung regime in North Korea. The group was tightly organized, and one scholar has suggested that its "managerial style" resembled that of major Japanese corporations.

Following heavy criticism at home and abroad for the government's "caving in" to terrorists' demands, the authorities announced their intention to recall and reissue approximately 5.6 million valid Japanese passports to make hijacking more difficult. A special police unit was formed to keep track of the terrorist group, and tight airport security measures were instigated. Despite issuing regular threats, the Japanese Red Army was relatively inactive in the 1980s. In 1990 its members were reported to be in North Korea and Lebanon undergoing further training and were available as mercenaries to promote various political causes.

Fusako Shigenobu, the founder and leader, was arrested in Osaka, Japan in November 2000.

== Uyoku dantai ==
Right-wing extremists were extremely diverse. In 1989 there were 800 such groups with about 120,000 members altogether. By police count, however, only about fifty groups and 23,000 individuals were considered active. Right-wing extremists indulged in a heady romanticism with strong links to the prewar period. They tended to be fascinated with the macho charisma of blood, sweat, and steel, and they promoted (like many nonradical groups) traditional samurai values as the antidote to the spiritual ills of postwar Japan. Their preference for violent direct action rather than words reflected the example of the militarist extremists of the 1930s and the heroic "men of strong will" of the late Tokugawa period of the 1850s and 1860s. The modern right-wing extremists demanded an end to the postwar "system of dependence" on the United States, restoration of the emperor to his prewar, divine status, and repudiation of Article 9. Many, if not most, right-wingers had intimate connections with Japan's gangster underground, the yakuza. Japanese right-wing extremists (Uyoku dantai) are notable for their use of black buses, which often carry loudspeakers broadcasting nationalistic slogans.

The ritual suicide of one of Japan's most prominent novelists, Yukio Mishima, following a failed attempt to initiate a rebellion among Self-Defense Forces units in November 1970, shocked and fascinated the public. Mishima and his small private army, the Shield Society (Tatenokai), hoped that a rising of the Self-Defense Forces would inspire a nationwide affirmation of the old values and put an end to the postwar "age of languid peace."

Although right-wing extremists were also responsible for the assassination of socialist leader Inejiro Asanuma in 1960 and an attempt on the life of former prime minister Masayoshi Ōhira in 1978, most of them, unlike their prewar counterparts, largely kept to noisy street demonstrations, especially harassment campaigns aimed at conventions of the leftist Japan Teachers' Union. In the early 1990s, however, there was evidence that a "new right" was becoming more violent. In May 1987, a reporter working for the liberal Asahi Shimbun was killed by a gunman belonging to the Sekihotai (Blood Revenge Corps). The Sekihotai also threatened to assassinate former Prime Minister Yasuhiro Nakasone for giving in to foreign pressure on such issues as the revision of textbook accounts of Japan's war record. In January 1990, a member of the Seikijuku (translatable as the (Sane Thinkers) School) shot and seriously wounded Nagasaki mayor Hitoshi Motoshima. The attack may have been provoked by the mayor's critical remarks concerning Emperor Hirohito.

That attack came two days after the left-wing Chukakuha (Middle Core Faction), opposed to the imperial system, claimed responsibility for firing a rocket onto the grounds of the residence of the late emperor's brother and a day before the government announced the events leading to the enthronement of Emperor Akihito in November 1990. The enthronement ceremonies were considered likely targets for extremist groups on the left and the right who saw the mysticism surrounding the emperor as being overemphasized or excessively reduced respectively, but no serious incidents took place.

More recently, the Zaitokukai have been focusing their attention on anti-Korean demonstrations.

== See also ==
- Uyoku dantai
- Reverse course
- Hantenren
- Ultranationalism (Japan)
