= Huang Wenxiong =

Huang Wenxiong (黄文雄, 黃文雄) is a human name, may refer to:

- Peter Huang (born 1937), Taiwanese activist
- Kō Bun'yū (born 1938), Taiwanese author
