= Seki-juku =

Seki-juku (伏見宿, Seki-juku or Seki-shuku) may refer to:

- Seki-juku (Tōkaidō), a station on the Tōkaidō road in former Ise Province, Japan
- Seki-shuku (Mikuni Kaidō), a station on the ancient Japanese highway Mikuni Kaidō
- Seikijuku, a right-wing Japanese imperialist group
