= National Socialist Japanese Workers' Party =

Neo-Nazi organisation in Japan

National Socialist Japanese Workers' Party 国家社会主義日本労働者党
- Abbreviation: NSJAP
- Leader: Koji Kishimoto
- Founded: 1982
- Headquarters: Tokyo, Japan
- Ideology: Neo-Nazism; Japanese ultranationalism; Ethnic nationalism
- Political position: Far-right
- International affiliation: World Union of National Socialists
- Colours: Black, red, white
- Councillors: 0 / 248
- Representatives: 0 / 465
- Prefectural assembly members: 0 / 2,675
- City and town assembly members: 0 / 30,490

Party flag

The National Socialist Japanese Workers' Party (Note: Japanese: 国家社会主義日本労働者党, Hepburn: Kokka Shakaishugi Nippon Rōdōsha-Tō) is a neo-Nazi political party in Japan. It was formerly headed by Kazunari Yamada (1962 – December 17, 2024), who maintained a website and blog which includes praise for Adolf Hitler and the September 11 attacks. Pictures of Yamada, a Holocaust-denier, posing with current prime minister Sanae Takaichi and LDP policy research chief Tomomi Inada were discovered on the website and became a source of controversy; both have denied support for the party.

== Beliefs ==
In the 1990s, the group campaigned for the expulsion of visa overstayers in Japan. The NSJAP campaigns against what it believes to be Jewish influence on both the world stage and in Japan's national affairs. The party advocates the abolition of the monarchy and the restoration of the shōgunate, as it believes that the Imperial House of Japan became subservient to international Jewry following World War II, and believes that the shogunate is the Japanese equivalent of the Führer principle. The NSJAP also campaigns against economic refugees, race mixing, and Freemasonry. The party also campaigns for what it calls "corporatistic autarky". The NSJAP is also anti-capitalist, anti-communist, antisemitic, anti-Zionist, anti-Korean, anti-Chinese, and anti-American. The party also denies the Holocaust and downplays or denies the war crimes and crimes against humanity committed by Imperial Japan during the Second Sino-Japanese War and World War 2, such as the Nanking Massacre, Manila Massacre, Unit 731, Comfort Women and many others.

== See also ==
- Uyoku dantai
  - Action Conservative Movement
  - Minzoku-ha
- Antisemitism in Japan
- Germany–Japan relations
- Honorary Aryan
- Japanese fascism
- Racism in Japan
- Tsagaan Khas
