= Ultranationalism (Japan) =

Political ideology in Japan

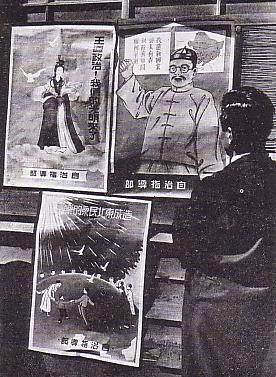
In 1930s and 1940s era ultranationalist Japan, the state routinely distributed political propaganda preaching the virtues of domination and expansion, with this photograph showing efforts in Manchukuo.

State ultranationalism (超國家主義 or 超国家主義, Chōkokkashugi; lit. "ultra-statism") or simply ultranationalism (ウルトラナショナリズム, Urutoranashonarizumu), refers mainly to the radical statist movement of the Shōwa period, but it can also refer to extreme Japanese nationalism before and after the Shōwa era.

State ultranationalists use the authority of the state/nation (国家) through Tennō as the focus of public loyalty. Other Ikki Kita's "state socialism" or "national socialism" (国家社会主義) is a representative idea referred to as 超国家主義 in Japan.

== History ==
Following the Meiji Restoration, Japanese political practice was consistently guided by statism/nationalism as its central axis. In the early 20th century, a radical faction led by figures such as Kita Ikki emerged from the lower and middle classes. They harbored deep resentment toward the entrenched elite—the Genrō, senior statesmen, the new and old nobility (Kazoku), military cliques (Gunbatsu), financial conglomerates (Zaibatsu), and party leaders—who they believed monopolized the nation's resources.

Seeking a fundamental break from the traditional statism/nationalism of the Meiji era, these radicals branded the representatives of the old order as the root of all national evil, advocating for their systematic elimination. This ideological rupture was most clearly manifested in their reimagining of the Emperor: no longer viewed merely as a symbol of tradition, the Emperor was transformed into a symbol of revolutionary change. Although the February 26 Incident of 1936—a coup d'état attempted by ultranationalist junior officers—ended in failure, it ultimately paved the way for Japan's transition into a militaristic era of total mobilization under Japanese nationalism four years later.

In the late 1930s, during the wartime period of the Empire of Japan, establishment insiders within the imperial leadership engineered a policy shift toward totalitarian control modeled directly on National Socialism. Scholar Masao Maruyama characterizes this adoption of state-directed Nazi techniques as "fascism from above", arguing that it is distinct from the more general "fascism from below".

== Connection to fascism ==
According to some scholars, Japan, which has a tradition of obedience, cooperation, and solidarity, already had at least a proto-fascist and proto-totalitarian spirit, so unlike Italy and Germany, it was able to adopt a totalitarian attitude without radical change in the late 1930s. Japanese liberal scholars, including Masao Maruyama, saw Japanese state ultranationalism as fascism and referred to it as "Emperor-system fascism" (天皇制ファシズム, Tennōsei fashizumu).

American historian Robert O. Paxton argues that with the absence of a mass revolutionary party and a rupture from the incumbent regime, Imperial Japan was merely "an expansionist military dictatorship with a high degree of state-sponsored mobilization [rather] than as a fascist regime". British historian Roger Griffin, called Putin's Russia and World War II-era Japan "emulated fascism in many ways, but was not fascist".

=== Analysis by Masao Maruyama ===
Masao Maruyama, assessed that the Japanese statist/nationalist (国家主義) government model was similar to [European] fascism, but not directly related to state/national-socialism (国家社会主義). However, he claimed that ultra-nationalism (超国家主義) as Japanese statism was clearly influenced by national-socialism. According to him, the proposal of [Japanese] ultra-nationalism is based on ideal socialism and combines the ideologies of some national-socialism.

According to the methodology of political practice, state/national-socialism is the socialism that the government promotes from top to bottom. Ultra-nationalists, on the one hand, wants the Tennō to accept their radical national-socialist ideology, but on the other hand, it causes problems at a low level and puts pressure on the government to reform. Eventually, Japan entered Japanese nationalism, which is similar to fascism, not a national-socialist state, but 40 years of ultra-nationalism have been a great success.

Japan has been in a state of statism/nationalism (国家主義) and militarism (軍国主義) since the Meiji Restoration, but it was this "ultra-" (超) that led Japan to the military path of Japanese nationalism. And this "ultra-" is the Japanese practice of national-socialist ideology.

== Ultranationalist organizations and political parties ==
=== Post-war ===
- Greater Japan Patriotic Party (1951–present)
- Tatenokai (1968–1970)
- National Socialist Japanese Workers' Party (1982–present)
- Nippon Kaigi (1997–present)
- Volunteer Army Unit for Punishing Traitors (2002–2003)
- Zaitokukai (2007–present)
- Japan First Party (2016–present)
- Sanseitō (2020–present)
- Conservative Party of Japan (2023–present)

The Liberal Democratic Party (1955–present), Japanese largest right-wing party, has an ultranationalist faction.

=== Pre-war ===
- Kokumin Jiyutō (1890–1891)
- Black Dragon Society (founded in 1901)
- Kokumin Dōmei (1932–1940)
- Tōhōkai (1936–1945)
- Imperial Rule Assistance Association (1940–1945)

== Ultranationalist figures ==
- Shinzo Abe
- Bin Akao
- Naoki Hyakuta
- Yoshio Kodama
- Hideaki Kase
- Nobusuke Kishi
- Ikki Kita
- Fumimaro Konoe
- Yukio Mishima
- Shūmei Ōkawa
- Makoto Sakurai
- Ryōichi Sasakawa
- Sanae Takaichi
- Hideki Tojo
- Ryōhei Uchida
- Otoya Yamaguchi

== Events ==
- October incident (1930–1931)
- March incident (1931)
- League of Blood Incident (1932)
- May 15 incident (1932)
- Military Academy incident (1934–1935)
- February 26 incident (1936)
- Nanjing massacre (1937)
- New Political Order (1940)
- Kyūjō incident (1945)
- Assassination of Inejirō Asanuma (1960)
- Sanmu incident (1961)
- Mishima Incident (1970)

== See also ==
- Japanese militarism
- Kokutai
- Kokutairon and Pure Socialism
- National essentialism
- Political extremism in Japan
- Uyoku dantai
- Netto-uyoku
- Italian fascism
- Nazism
