= Action Conservative Movement =

Far-right movement in Japan

Action Conservative Movement (Note: Alternatively Kōdō-suru Undō (行動する運動). Other translations include Conservative Action Movement (CAM), or Action Movement.) (ACM; Japanese: 行動する保守, romanized: Kōdō-suru hoshu) is an umbrella term for a number of conservative activist groups that emerged in Japan beginning in the second half of the 2000s.

The groups are considered to be ultranationalist and far right (uyoku dantai), associated with the use of hate speech, and associated with the far right internet movement in Japan (netto-uyoku).

== Description ==
The movement emerged beginning around 2006. They primarily protest on topics relating to foreigners, particularly Koreans in Japan. They have also protested Buddhist groups, the mainstream Japanese media, and sometimes the local and national governments. They are widely considered to use hate speech. Groups like Zaitokukai and Shuken Kaifuku o Mezasu Kai are famously part of the movement.

The movement has been described as more confrontational and aggressive than far right Japanese groups of the past. One Zainichi Korean said of them in 2008:

They seem worse than old, traditional uyoku (rightists). At least old uyoku had a system of thought—worshipping the emperor, pride in ancient Japanese culture. When I was a girl, going to Korean school, their sound trucks would often come, but they never seemed to be attacking us personally. They didn't abuse the children—they just criticized the government of North Korea. I was not frightened of them—they were just this weird thing that you kind of got used to. But the Zaitokukai come closer and scare the children.

They have been challenged by and met with counterprotests from local Japanese groups, such as the Counter-Racist Action Collective. This has led to physical clashes among various groups over time.

== Background ==
According to scholar Tom Gill, the Japanese far-right has been on the decline since the 1960s. One significant period for the decline was in the late 1980s and early 1990s, with the decline and eventual collapse of the Soviet Union and the decline of anti-communist activism, the death of Emperor Hirohito, and the beginning of Japan's economic stagnation. Statistics on violent incidents and arrests of the far right also correspondingly decreased.

Statistics on uyoku dantai in Japan over time
Year	# groups	# members
1965	550	120,000
1993	1,450	22,000
2003	1,530	15,600
2010	4,860	13,400

=== Rise ===
Despite the overall decline of the far right in Japan, a number of factors also beginning in the 1990s contributed to the rise of Kōdō-suru Hoshu by the mid-2000s.

==== Anti-Korean sentiment ====
Koreans began arriving in Japan in significant quantities during the Japanese colonial period. This population and their descendents have now been in Japan for several generations, and are known as "Zainichi Koreans". Korea was liberated in 1945, but Koreans who chose to remain in Japan had their Japanese citizenships stripped by the 1947 Alien Registration Ordinance, rendering them stateless, without the right to vote, and without food aid or civil protections during a period of significant poverty and instability. Some began acquiring Korean citizenship, but the matter was complicated by the division of Korea, with some of the population acquiring North Korean citizenship (called Chōsenjin; 朝鮮人), some South Korean (called Kankokujin; 韓国人), and some remaining stateless.

Kōdō-suru Hoshu groups often consider Koreans to have "special privileges" (tokken; 特権). They argue that Koreans are able to go through airport security with fewer barriers than regular foreigners, benefit from the ability to take the university exams in the Korean language, not deported if they commit serious crimes, and only have their legal Japanese names reported if they commit a crime (without their Korean names mentioned). Scholar Tom Gill describes these as "modest privileges" with "at least some factual basis", but identifies other accusations that he describes as having "no basis in reality". Koreans are accused of having tax privileges, which they argue has led to many wealthy Korean people in Japan, such as Masayoshi Son and Han Chang-woo. They have even accused some Japanese businesspeople of secretly being ethnic Korean. They also accuse Zainichi Koreans of abusing and being disproportionate receivers of social welfare, while not acknowledging the generations of systemic poverty and discrimination that created the need for their receipt of welfare. They have called for violence against Koreans on a number of occasions.

Gill also notes that anti-Japanese sentiment in Korea is also a potentially even more severe and openly-displayed issue. He describes a feeling of Japan receiving abuse and not being able to respond as a potential motivator for anti-foreign and anti-Korean sentiment in Japan.

==== Japan's colonial past and relations with Korea ====
The 1990s saw the beginnings of significant controversy over the "comfort women" issue between South Korea and Japan. Furthermore, the Japanese Society for History Textbook Reform was founded in 1996, and advocated for nationalist narratives in Japanese history textbooks. Fingerprinting requirements were lifted for Zainichi Koreans in 1999. That same year, the website 2channel was founded, which is now widely associated with extremist and racist rhetoric. The rise of the Korean Wave in Japan created backlash with media like Manga Kenkanryu ("Hating the Korean Wave Manga"). The Liancourt Rocks ("Dokdo"/"Takeshima") issue escalated in both Japan and Korea.

Amidst this context, the first Kōdō-suru Hoshu group, Shuken Kaifuku o Mezasu Kai, was founded in July 2006, and Zaitokukai was founded in December.

== Groups ==
- Zaitokukai
- Shuken Kaifuku o Mezasu Kai
- 外国人犯罪追放運動
- 外国人参政権に反対する会
- 護国志士の会
- 日本侵略を許さない国民の会
- Ishin Seito Shimpu
- Japan Women's Group Gentle Breeze (日本女性の会 そよ風)
- Aikoku Jyosei no Tsudoi Hanadokei
- Japanese Women for Justice and Peace
