= Kō Bun'yū =

Taiwanese author (1938–2024)

Kō Bun'yū (Japanese: 黄文雄; 1938 – 2024), also known as Huang Wenxiong (Chinese: 黃文雄; pinyin: Huáng Wénxióng; Pe̍h-ōe-jī: N̂g Bûn-hiông), was a controversial Taiwanese author, an activist of the Taiwan independence movement, who is well-known for his staunch anti-Mainland Chinese stance and for penning a number of highly controversial books about Chinese, Japanese and Korean history and culture. Most of his life, he was living in Japan.

== Early life and education ==
In 1960s, while studying at Waseda University Ko began his activist career: he published articles and edited magazines for the Taiwanese community, questioned the legitimacy of the Chinese Nationalist Party’s military occupation of Taiwan and advocated for building up a Taiwan nation.

== Career ==
Kō was a visiting professor at Takushoku University. His works often assert that Taiwan and Korea owe their present-day successes, and much of their culture, to Japan.

=== Political activism ===
Kō was an advisor to the Society for the Restoration of Sovereignty (Shukenkaifuku wo mezasukai) and a councilor of the World Strategic Research Institute (a think tank affiliated with the Family Federation for World Peace and Unification (formerly the Unification Church)).

In 1974, he was among the organisers of World Federation of Taiwanese Associations

In early 2000, following the Democratic Progressive Party’s first transition into power, Kō and other Taiwanese public figures collaborated with then-Representative of Taiwan to Japan, Hsu Shih-kai (許世楷), in a lobbying campaign that successfully convinced the Government of Japan to grant visa-free status to Taiwanese nationals.

In 2015, Kō made a statement claiming that the people of Taiwan regret Japan's defeat in World War II and insists China should "pay its respects at Yasukuni Shrine". He further backed Japanese revisionist views of World War II history by denying war crimes, comfort women, the Pearl Harbour attack and the Nanjing Massacre

== Death ==
Kō died in July 2024 at the age of 85. His death was announced on 26 August 2024, on Facebook by Chen Chung-guang, chairman of the Taiwan Independence Federation. Taiwanese mass media reported Ko bunyu's death, but Japanese mass media did not report it at all.

== Books by Kō ==
- The ugly Chinaman (Japanese: 醜い中国人; Minikui Chūgoku-jin)
- The fabricated history of Japan (捏造された日本史; Netsuzō sareta Nihon-shi)
- Japan - falling into the trap of Sinocentrism (中華思想の罠に嵌った日本; Chūka shisō no wana ni hamatta Nihon)
- The Japanese people's virtue which has been erased from history - About this country's "Inheritance of the Spirit" which is now being revived (歴史から消された日本人の美徳―今蘇るこの国の"心の遺産"とは; Rekishi kara kesareta Nihon-jin no bitoku - Ima yomigaeru kono kuni no "kokoro no isan" to wa)
- The curse of Sinocentrism lurking within Chinese character culture (漢字文明にひそむ中華思想の呪縛; Kanji bunmei ni hisomu Chūka shisō no jubaku)
- South Korea was built by the Japanese (韓国は日本人がつくった; Kankoku wa Nihon-jin ga tsukutta)
- Taiwan was built by the Japanese people (台湾は日本人がつくった; Taiwan wa Nihon-jin ga tsukutta)
- The Bushido spirit bequeathed to Taiwan by the Japanese people (日本人が台湾に遺した武士道精神; Nihon-jin ga Taiwan ni nokoshita Bushidō seishin)
- The unknown truth about the Second Sino-Japanese War (日中戦争知られざる真実; Nicchū Sensō no shirarezaru shinjitsu)
- The inheritance of Manchukuo (満州国の遺産; Manshūkoku no isan)
- How the Chinese are taking advantage of Japanese confusion (つけあがるな中国人うろたえるな日本人; Tsukeagaru na Chūgoku-jin urotaeru na Nihon-jin)
- How far will China continue to crack? (どこまで中国に喰われ続けるのか; Doko made Chūgoku ni kuware-tsuzukeru no ka)
- 7 reasons why China cannot prevail over Japan even if it dies trying (中国が死んでも日本に勝てない7つの理由; Chūgoku ga shinde mo Nihon ni katenai nanatsu no riyū)

Kō also provided the script for the manga An Introduction to China: A Study of Our Bothersome Neighbors (マンガ中国入門 やっかいな隣人の研究; Manga Chūgoku nyūmon: Yakkai na rinjin no kenkyū).

== See also ==
- Hanjian
- Taiwan independence movement
- World United Formosans for Independence
- Sinophobia
- Action Conservative Movement
- Unification_Church
