= Racism in Japan =

Racism in Japan (人種主義, jinshushugi) comprises negative attitudes and views on race or ethnicity which are held by various people and groups in Japan, and have been reflected in discriminatory laws, practices and action (including violence) at various times in the history of Japan against racial or ethnic groups.

According to official statistics from the Immigration Services Agency of Japan, as at October 2024, foreign population in Japan is estimated at 3.77 million, accounting for 3.04% of the total population of Japan.

The number of foreign workers has increased strongly in recent years, due to the aging population and a shrinking labor force. A news article in 2018 suggests that approximately 1 out of 10 young people residing in Tokyo are foreign nationals. According to the CIA World Factbook, Japanese make up 98.1% of the population, Chinese 0.5%, and Korean 0.4%, with the remaining 1% representing all other ethnic groups.

Although Article 14 of the Constitution of Japan guarantees equality under the law and prohibits discrimination on the basis of race, belief, sex, or social status, Japan does not have a comprehensive civil law which prohibits racial, ethnic, or religious discrimination. However, legal provisions and policies addressing specific issues do exist, including legislation such as the Hate Speech Act of 2016. Non-Japanese individuals in Japan sometimes face human rights challenges that differ from those faced by Japanese citizens; Japan has no national human rights institution. In 2020, some non-Japanese media reported on cases of Japanese firms confiscating the passports of guest workers, particularly unskilled laborers.

In the early 20th century, driven by an ideology of Japanese nationalism and in the name of national unity, the Japanese government identified and forcefully assimilated marginalized populations, including indigenous Ryukyuans and Ainu. In Japan, these are often considered a "subgroup" of the Japanese Yamato people rather than minority groups with distinct cultures.

== Background ==
=== Demographics ===
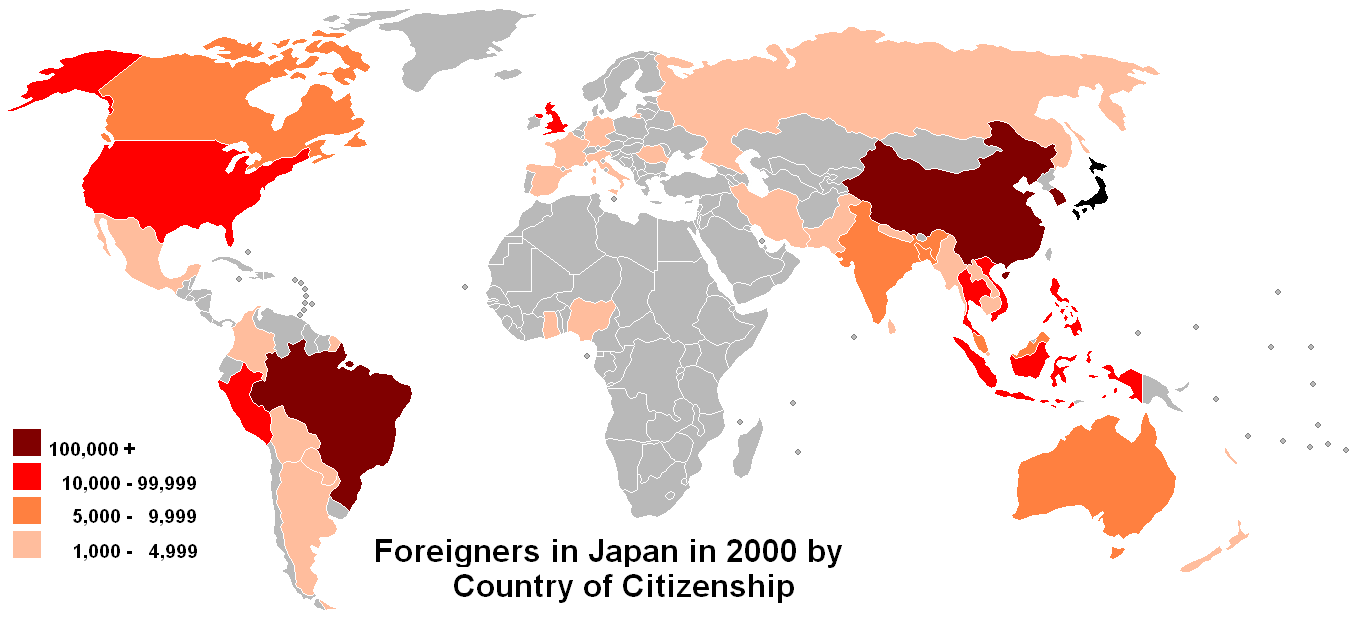
Citizenship of foreigners in Japan in 2000. Source: Japan Statistics Bureau

About 2.4% of Japan's total legal resident population are foreign citizens. Of these, according to 2022 data from the Japanese government, the principal groups are as follows.

Nationality	Number	Percentage of foreign citizens
China	761,563	24.8%
Vietnam	489,312	15.9%
(North Korea) North/South Korea (Note: Japan recognizes the Republic of Korea (South Korea) as the government of the entire Korean Peninsula, and for this reason doesn't consider passports issued by the Democratic People's Republic of Korea (North Korea) to be valid. Instead, Japan uses the term "Chōsen" to refer to all ethnic Koreans in Japan who hold neither Japanese nor South Korean citizenship.)	436,670	14.2%
Philippines	298,740	9.7%
Brazil	209,430	6.8%
Nepal	139,393	4.5%
Indonesia	98,865	3.2%
United States	60,804	2.0%
Taiwan	57,294	1.9%
Thailand	56,701	1.8%
Others	491,799	16.0%
Total (as of 2022)	3,075,213	100%

The above statistics do not include the approximately 20,000 U.S. military stationed in Japan, nor do they account for illegal immigrants. The statistics also do not take into account naturalized citizens from backgrounds including but not limited to Korean and Chinese, nor do they include citizen descendants of immigrants. The total legal resident population of 2012 is estimated at 127.6 million.

== By target ==
=== Japanese ethnic minorities ===
The nine largest minority groups residing in Japan are: North and South Korean, Chinese, Taiwanese, Brazilian (many Brazilians in Japan have Japanese ancestors), Filipinos, Vietnamese, the Ainu indigenous to Hokkaido, the Ryukyuans indigenous to Okinawa, and other islands between Kyushu and Taiwan. The burakumin, an outcast group at the bottom of Japan's feudal order, are sometimes included. There are also a number of smaller ethnic communities in Japan with a much shorter history.

According to a 2008 report for the United Nations Human Rights Council, communities most affected by racism and xenophobia in Japan include:

- the national minorities of Ainu and people of Okinawa,
- people and descendants of people from neighbouring countries (Chinese and Koreans), and
- new immigrants from other Asian, African, South American and Middle Eastern countries.

=== Koreans ===
Since the Japan–Korea Treaty of 1876 and up to World War II, Koreans sought asylum and educational opportunities that were available in Japan. In 1910, the Japan-Korean Annexation Treaty was established, granting Koreans Japanese citizenship through the annexation of Korea. Zainichi (在日; lit. 'in Japan') Koreans are long-term residents of Japan who can trace their ancestry to this wave of Korean migration to Japan. Most Zainichi came to Japan from Korea under Japanese rule between 1910 and 1945. A large proportion of this immigration is said to be the result of Korean landowners and workers losing their land and livelihood due to Japanese land and production confiscation initiatives and migrating to Japan for work. According to the calculation of Rudolph Rummel, a total of 5.4 million Koreans were also conscripted into forced labor and shipped throughout the Japanese Empire. He estimates that 60,000 Koreans died during forced labor in places such as Manchuria and Sakhalin.

During the Japanese rule of Korea, the Japanese government implemented a policy of cultural assimilation. Korean culture was suppressed, artistic and literary works that opposed Japanese rule were subjected to censorship and prohibition, and the Korean language was regarded as a regional ethnic language (民族語) and suppressed, while the Japanese language was designated as the national language, with Koreans being required to learn it. After a relatively lenient period, the Korean language course in public schools was downgraded to a non-compulsory subject in 1938 and cancelled in 1941, though the Korean language and Hangeul were still used in war-time propaganda until the last days of Japanese rule. Koreans were forced to take Japanese names from 1940. However, Koreans resisted this policy, and by the end of the 1940s, it was almost completely undone. Thousands of ethnic Koreans in Japan were massacred as false rumors spread that Koreans were rioting, looting, or poisoning wells in the aftermath of the 1923 Great Kantō earthquake in the Kantō Massacre. Many Korean refugees also came to the country during the Jeju uprising in the First Republic of South Korea. Though most migrants returned to Korea, GHQ estimates in 1946 indicated that approximately 650,000 Koreans remained in Japan.

After World War II, in the absence of a Korean government, two million Koreans were granted a temporary Joseon (Korean: 조선, Japanese: Chōsen (朝鮮)) nationality under the U.S. military government. As Joseon was annexed by Japan, Zainichi Koreans with Joseon citizenship are de facto stateless. The meaning of Joseon nationality became vague following the division of Korea by the United States and the Soviet Union.

The last major wave of Korean migration to Japan started after South Korea was devastated by the Korean War in the 1950s. Most notably, a large number of refugees were from Jejuans escaping from the massacres on Jeju Island by the authoritarian South Korean government. When North and South Korea each established their own government, the Korean community in Japan was split between allegiance to North Korea (Chongryon) and South Korea (Mindan). Zainichi Koreans are prohibited from registering with North Korean nationality.

Zainichi who identify themselves with Chongryon are an important money source for North Korea. One estimate suggests that the total annual transfers from Japan to North Korea may exceed US$200 million. Japanese law does not allow dual citizenship for adults over age 22 and until the 1980s required adoption of a Japanese name for citizenship. Partially for this reason, many Zainichi did not obtain Japanese citizenship, as they saw the process as humiliating.

Although more Zainichi are becoming Japanese citizens, issues of identity remain complicated. Even those who do not choose to become Japanese citizens often use Japanese names to avoid discrimination, and live their lives as if they were Japanese. This is in contrast with the Chinese living in Japan, who generally use their Chinese names and openly form Chinatown communities. An increase in tensions between Japan and North Korea in the late 1990s led to a surge of attacks against Chongryon, the pro-North residents' organisation, including a pattern of assaults against students attending Chongryon schools. The Japanese authorities have recently started to crack down on Chongryon with investigations and arrests. These moves are often criticized by Chongryon as acts of political suppression.

When Tokyo Governor Shintaro Ishihara referred to Chinese and Koreans as sangokujin (三国人) in 2000 in the context of foreigners being a potential source of unrest in the aftermath of an earthquake, the foreign community complained. Historically, the word has often been used pejoratively, and Ishihara's statement evoked images of the massacre of Koreans by civilians and police alike after the 1923 Great Kantō earthquake. Therefore, the use of the term in context of potential rioting by foreigners is considered by many as provocative, if not explicitly racist.

In 2014, a United States government human rights report expressed concern about the abuse and harassment directed against Korean nationals by Japanese right-wing groups such as uyoku dantai. In 2022, it was reported that anti-Korean racism in Japan has been on the rise, with homes burned, including one in Utoro district in Uji, and death threats made towards ethnic Korean communities.

=== Mainland Chinese ===
Mainland Chinese are the largest legal minority in Japan (according to the 2018 statistics as shown above). An investigator from the United Nations Commission on Human Rights (UNCHR) said, racism against Koreans and Chinese is deeply rooted in Japan because of history and culture.

=== Taiwanese ===
There are a number of Taiwanese people that reside in Japan due to Taiwan's history as being a colony of Japan from 1895 to 1945. Renhō (born Hsieh Lien-fang (Chinese: 謝蓮舫; pinyin: Xiè Liánfǎng; Japanese pronunciation: Sha Renhō)), the former leader of the Democratic Party, is known to be the most famous mixed Taiwanese-Japanese politician.

In 2000, the then governor of Tokyo Shintaro Ishihara insulted the Taiwanese, referring to them as Sangokujin:

I referred to the "many sangokujin who entered Japan illegally." I thought some people would not know that word so I paraphrased it and used gaikokujin, or foreigners. But it was a newspaper holiday so the news agencies consciously picked up the sangokujin part, causing the problem.

... After World War II, when Japan lost, the Chinese of Taiwanese origin and people from the Korean Peninsula persecuted, robbed, and sometimes beat up Japanese. It's at that time the word was used, so it was not derogatory. Rather we were afraid of them.

... There's no need for an apology. I was surprised that there was a big reaction to my speech. In order not to cause any misunderstanding, I decided I will no longer use that word. It is regrettable that the word was interpreted in the way it was.

=== Ainu ===
The Ainu are an indigenous group mainly living in Hokkaidō, with some also living in modern-day Russia. At present, the official Japanese government estimate of the population is 25,000, though this number has been disputed with unofficial estimates of upwards of 200,000.

For much of Japanese history, the Ainu were the main inhabitants of Hokkaido. However, as a result of Japanese migration into the island after 1869, the Ainu were largely displaced and assimilated. Due to Meiji era policies, the Ainu were evicted from their traditional homelands and their cultural practices were outlawed. Official recognition of the Ainu as an indigenous group occurred over a century later on June 6, 2008, as a result of a resolution passed by the government of Japan, which recognized both their cultural differences and their past struggles.

Research shows that Ainu on average have lower levels of educational attainment, a lower quality of life, and are in worse socioeconomic conditions than Yamato Japanese. Professor of Japanese Culture Michele Mason highlights how these conditions are a result of the assimilation policies of the past and the colonial process that the Ainu were subjected to. One result of the assimilation policies has been the dying off of the Ainu language, with UNESCO recognising it as critically endangered. Surveys conducted among Ainu people in 2017 found that 30% had experienced direct discrimination for being Ainu, with more having witnessed anti-Ainu discrimination and having anxiety about potential discrimination.

=== Ryukyuan ===
The Ryukyuan people lived in an independent kingdom until it became a vassal of Japan's Satsuma Domain in 1609. The kingdom, however, retained a degree of autonomy until 1872 when the islands were officially annexed by Japan and restructured as Okinawa Prefecture in 1879. They are now Japan's largest minority group, with 1.3 million living in Okinawa and 300,000 living in other areas of Japan.

The Okinawan language, the most widely spoken Ryukyuan language, is related to Japanese, the two being in the Japonic languages. Ryukyuan languages were heavily suppressed through a policy of forced assimilation throughout the former Ryukyu Kingdom after it was annexed in 1872. With only the standard Japanese taught in schools and students punished for speaking or writing their native language through the use of dialect cards, the younger generations of Ryukyuans began to give up their "backwards" culture for that of Japan. The Japanese government officially labels the Ryukyuan languages as dialects (方言, hōgen) of Japanese, although they are not mutually intelligible with each other or with Japanese. In 1940, there was a political debate amongst Japanese leaders about whether or not to continue the oppression of the Ryukyuan languages, although the argument for assimilation prevailed. During the Battle of Okinawa, the Japanese military commander sought to suppress spying by banning the speaking of Okinawan, which is often unintelligible to nonresidents. As a result, around one thousand civilians were killed by soldiers. There are still some children learning Ryukyuan languages natively, but this is rare, especially on mainland Okinawa. The language still is used in traditional cultural activities such as folk music and folk dance.

After the annexation of the islands, many Ryukyuans, especially Okinawans, migrated to the mainland to find jobs or better living conditions. They were sometimes met with discrimination, such as workplaces with signs that read "No Ryukyuans or Koreans." At the 1903 Osaka Exhibition, an exhibit called the "Pavilion of the World" (人類館, Jinruikan) had actual Okinawans, Ainu, Koreans, and other "backwards" peoples on display in their native clothes and housing. Traditional Ryukyuan Hajichi Tattoos were banned by the Meiji government in 1899.

During the Battle of Okinawa, some Japanese soldiers committed multiple atrocities against Okinawan civilians, including rape, murder, using them as human shields, and persuading or forcing them to commit suicide. In 2007, the Ministry of Education attempted to revise school textbooks to lessen mention of these atrocities, but was met with massive demonstrations in Okinawa.

Culturally, Okinawa showed great influences from southern China, Taiwan, and Southeast Asia, reflecting its long history of trade with these regions. However, because of the standard use of Japanese in schools, television, and all print media in Okinawa, these cultural differences are often glossed over in Japanese society. Consequently, many Japanese consider Okinawans to be Yamato Japanese, sometimes ignoring their distinct cultural and historical heritage in insensitive ways.

=== Other groups ===
People of foreign origin and nationality are often called 外国人 Gaikokujin (foreign country person) or 外人 Gaijin (outsider or alien), with the latter term occasionally perceived to be pejorative and thus often avoided by mass media.

South Sakhalin, which was once part of Japan as Karafuto Prefecture, had indigenous populations of Nivkhs and Uilta (Orok). Like the Karafuto Koreans but unlike the Ainu, they were thus not included in the evacuation of Japanese nationals after the Soviet invasion in 1945. Some Nivkhs and Uilta who served in the Imperial Japanese Army were held in Soviet work camps; after court cases in the late 1950s and 1960s, they were recognised as Japanese nationals and thus permitted to migrate to Japan. Most settled around Abashiri, Hokkaidō. The Uilta Kyokai was founded to fight for Uilta rights and the preservation of Uilta traditions in 1975 by Dahinien Gendānu.

The Bonin Islanders of the Bonin Islands have a varied ethnic background, including European, Micronesian and Kanak.

Although protection and refugee status has been granted to those seeking asylum from Myanmar, the same has not been offered to refugee Kurds in Japan from Turkey. Without this protection and status, these Kurds who have fled from Turkey due to persecution are generally living in destitution, with no education and having no legal residency status. A clash took place outside the Turkish embassy in Tokyo in October 2015 between Kurds and Turks in Japan after a Kurdish party flag was shown at the embassy. Beginning in spring 2023, there was a significant increase in anti-Kurdish Japanese posts on the social media platform X. This was possibly fueled by Turkish people posting in Japanese on the platform. Kurds have reported receiving death threats and demands for their expulsion from the country.

The Burakumin group within Japan is ethnically Japanese; however, they are considered of lower status in comparison to other ethnicities in Japan. They were primarily associated with occupations considered unclean, such as executioners, undertakers, butchers, tanners, and slaughterhouse workers. As an outcaste group, they were subject to restrictions on movement, marriage, and clothing. Despite the elimination of the feudal caste system during the Meiji Restoration, buraku communities continued to face employment discrimination and poor living standards. Prominent advocacy groups include the Buraku Liberation League and its predecessor, the Suiheisha.

Representation of black people in Japanese media, such as anime, has been subject to criticism.

Instances of harassment, hate speech and discrimination targeting Russians living in Japan were reported after Russian invasion of Ukraine. Foreign Minister Yoshimasa Hayashi condemned human rights abuses against Russians that took place.

In January 2024, three foreign-born residents in Japan sued the national and local governments, alleging racial profiling through illegal police questioning. The plaintiffs asserted that they experienced repeated distress from police questioning based on their appearance and ethnicity, which they claimed violated the constitution. They sought recognition of the illegality of racial profiling and 3 million yen ($20,250) in damages each. The lawsuit emerged during a surge in foreign workers in Japan and discussions on Japanese identity.

== By field ==
=== Higher learning ===
Although foreign professors teach throughout the Japanese higher education system, Robert J. Geller of the University of Tokyo reported, in 1992, that it was extremely rare for them to be given tenure.

=== Non-Japanese citizens and crimes ===
As in other countries, foreigners sometimes do work that is not allowed by their visas, or overstay the terms of their visas. Their employment tends to be concentrated in fields where most Japanese are not able to or no longer wish to work.

The yakuza has made use of Chinese immigrants in Japan as henchmen to commit crimes, which have led to a negative public perception. In 2003, foreigners from Africa were responsible for 2.8 times as much crime per capita as Japanese natives but were slightly less likely to commit violent crime.

According to National Police Authority records, in 2002, 16,212 foreigners were caught committing 34,746 crimes, over half of which turned out to be visa violations (residing/working in Japan without a valid visa). The statistics show that 12,667 cases (36.5%) and 487 individuals (0.038%) were Chinese, 5,272 cases (15.72%) and 1,186 individuals (7.3%) were Brazilian, and 2,815 cases (8.1%) and 1,738 individuals (10.7%) were Korean and ~6000 were others foreigners. The total number of crimes committed in the same year by Japanese was 546,934 cases. Within these statistics, Japanese committed 6,925 violent crimes, of which 2,531 were arson or rape, while foreigners committed 323 violent crimes, but only 42 cases are classified as arson or rape. Foreigners were more likely to commit crimes in groups: About 61.5% of crimes committed by foreigners had one or more accomplice, while only 18.6% of crimes committed by Japanese were in groups. Japanese commit more violent crimes than foreigners.

According to a 2022 study by the National Police Agency, the number of illegal residents decreased from 219,000 in 2004 to 113,000 in 2008. In addition, the number of arrested foreign visitors decreased from 21,842 in 2004 to 13,880 in 2008. The percentage of foreign nationals in all arrestees charged in penal code crimes was about 2.0% and this number has remained relatively stable. While the percentage of foreign nationals among all arrestees charged in cases involving robbery or burglary was around 5.5% in 2008.

According to a survey conducted by the Tokyo Bar Association, more than 60% of 2,000 respondents from foreign backgrounds reported being interrogated by the police. Among those questioned, about 77% stated that the encounters seemed to lack any apparent reason other than their foreign appearance.

The former head of the Tokyo Metropolitan Government's Emergency Public Safety Task Force, Hiroshi Kubo, published a book called Chian wa Hontouni Akkashiteirunoka (治安はほんとうに悪化しているのか) (in English: Is Public Safety Really Deteriorating?, ISBN 978-4-86162-025-6) disputing foreign crime statistics, suggesting that such statistics were being manipulated by politicians for political gain. He suggested, for example, that including visa violations in crime statistics is misleading. He also said that the crime rate in Tokyo is based on reported, rather than actual, crimes.

=== Access to housing and other services ===
A significant number of apartments, and some motels, night clubs, brothels, sex parlours, and public baths in Japan have put up signs stating that foreigners are not allowed, or that they must be accompanied by a Japanese person to enter.

In February 2002, plaintiffs sued a Hokkaido bathhouse in Sapporo District Court pleading racial discrimination; on November 11, the court ordered the bathhouse to pay the plaintiffs ¥1 million each in damages.

There have been a substantial number of lawsuits regarding discrimination against foreigners. For example, in 2005, a Korean woman who attempted to rent a room was refused because she was not a Japanese citizen. She filed and won a discrimination lawsuit.

"Discrimination toward foreign nationals in their searches for homes continues to be one of the biggest problems", said the head of the Ethnic Media Press Centre. Organizers of the service said they hope to eradicate the racism that prevents foreigners, particularly non-Westerners, from renting apartments since there are currently no laws in Japan that ban discrimination against non-citizens.

During the COVID-19 pandemic, many establishments began excluding non-Japanese customers over fears that they would spread the coronavirus. For example, a ramen shop owner imposed a rule prohibiting non-Japanese people from entering the restaurant.

=== Healthcare ===
Japan provides universal health insurance for all citizens. Foreigners staying in Japan for a year or more are required to enroll for one of the public health insurance schemes. However, before this policy was mandated, many foreign workers, particularly Japanese Brazilians, were more likely to lack health insurance due to refusal of the employer.

Initially, many prefectures refused to allow foreigners from entering the National Health Insurance (Kokumin Kenkou Hoken) as foreigners were not considered to be eligible. The policy was revised to include foreigners after local governments witnessed healthcare disparities between Japanese citizens and foreigners. A study conducted revealed that incidences of increased poor health was high among foreign workers living in Tochigi Prefecture. A quarter of these workers did not visit clinics or hospitals due to language barriers and high medical costs. Nearly 60% of the 317 workers surveyed experienced difficulty in communicating in English.

Some hospitals have been known to turn patients away if they are unable to confirm their residence status. The NTT Medical Center Tokyo announced on their website that foreigners must present their insurance card and residence cards or else be denied service, with the exception of emergency cases. A maternity ward, located in Tokyo, had stated on their website that services would be limited for patients who could only speak at a conversational level in Japanese.

During the COVID-19 pandemic, many ethnic-minority healthcare providers have been found to not be assigned to treating patients with the COVID-19 infection. Possible reasons for this include the low number of ethnic-minority healthcare providers working in Japan's clinics and hospitals, as well as language barriers.

=== Police racial profiling ===
In December 2021, the U.S. Embassy in Tokyo warned of "suspected racial profiling" by police across Japan against non-Japanese residents. Since 2022, the number of people coming forward about racial profiling complaints against police officers in Japan has greatly expanded. In January 2024, three foreign-born residents of Japan filed a lawsuit which alleged they were repeatedly questioned by police based on their physical appearances, with one plaintiff, Pakistan-born Syed Zain, claiming that he was harassed by police at least 70 times since arriving in Japan in 2002. On 30 April 2024, an investigation by the Mainichi Shimbun found that numerous Japanese police officers had a high rate of racial profiling incidents which involved targeting foreigners. One former officer inspector from a western prefecture saw police consistently being ordered by senior officers to target foreigners for questioning, ID checks, and searches; the inspector told the newspaper that "we were told to target foreigners." According the former investigator, people with Korean, Black and Southeast Asian roots were among those most frequently targeted, with Japanese police also regarding these groups of people to more dangerous than white people, stating "Officers assume (light-skinned people) are tourists or have a Japanese partner. But with people with dark skin, they tend to assume they're visa overstayers." On May 8, 2022, The New York Times reported that racial profiling was "prevalent" in Japan, but not often documented.

== History ==
=== Pre-war xenophobia ===
Racial discrimination against other Asians was habitual in Imperial Japan, which first practiced it during the start of Japanese colonialism. The Meiji era Japanese were contemptuous of other Asians because they believed that other Asians were inferior to them. This sentiment was expressed in Datsu-A Ron, an editorial whose author espoused the belief that Japan should treat other Asians as other western empires treated them. Discrimination was also enacted against Ryūkyū and Ainu peoples. The Shōwa regime preached racial superiority and racialist theories, based on the nature of Yamato-damashii. According to historian Kurakichi Shiratori, one of Emperor Hirohito's teachers: "Therefore nothing in the world compares to the divine nature (shinsei) of the imperial house and likewise the majesty of our national polity (kokutai). Here is one great reason for Japan's superiority." The Japanese culture long regarded Gaijin (non-Japanese) people to be subhumans and included Yamato master race theory ideology in government propaganda and schools as well.

As stated in An Investigation of Global Policy with the Yamato Race as Nucleus, a classified report which was published by the Ministry of Health, Labour and Welfare on July 1, 1943, just as a family has harmony and reciprocity, but with a clear-cut hierarchy, the Japanese, as a racially superior people, are destined to rule Asia "eternally" as the head of the family of Asian nations. The most horrific xenophobia of the pre-Shōwa period was displayed after the 1923 Great Kantō earthquake, where in the confusion after a massive earthquake, Koreans were wrongly maligned as poisoning the water supply. A vicious pogrom resulted in the deaths of at least 3,000 Koreans, and the imprisonment of 26,000.

In the 1930s, the number of attacks on Westerners and their Japanese friends by nationalist citizens increased due to the influence of Japanese military-political doctrines in the early years of the Showa period, these attacks occurred after a long build-up which started in the Meiji period, when a few samurai die-hards refused to accept foreigners in Japan. For an exception, see Jewish settlement in the Japanese Empire.

=== World War II ===
Racism was omnipresent in the press during the Second Sino-Japanese War and the Greater East Asia War and the media's descriptions of the superiority of the Yamato people was unwaveringly consistent. The first major anti-foreigner publicity campaign, called Bōchō (Guard Against Espionage), was launched in 1940 alongside the proclamation of the Tōa shin Chitsujo (New Order in East Asia) and its first step, the Hakkō ichiu. Initially, in order to justify Japan's conquest of Asia, Japanese propaganda espoused the ideas of Japanese supremacy by claiming that the Japanese represented a combination of all Asian peoples and cultures, emphasizing heterogeneous traits. Japanese propaganda started to place an emphasis on the ideas of racial purity and the supremacy of the Yamato race when the Second Sino-Japanese War intensified.

Mostly after the launching of the Pacific War, Westerners were detained by official authorities, and on occasion were objects of violent assaults, sent to police jails or military detention centers or suffered bad treatment in the street. This applied particularly to Americans, Soviets and British; in Manchukuo at the same period xenophobic attacks were carried out against Chinese and other non-Japanese.

At the end of World War II, the Japanese government continued to adhere to the notion of racial homogeneity and racial supremacy, as well as an overall complex of social hierarchy, with the Yamato race at the top of the racial hierarchy. Japanese propaganda of racial purity returned to post-World War II Japan because of the support of the Allied forces. U.S. policy in Japan terminated the purge of high-ranking fascist war criminals and reinstalled the leaders who were responsible for the creation and manifestation of prewar race propaganda.

Similar to what would occur in Korea, the overwhelming presence of American soldiers, most of whom were young and unmarried, disrupted some of the traditional social and gender relations. The obvious power dynamic after the war outcome, as well as the lack of accountability for American soldiers who impregnated Japanese women, placed these children into a negative light before their lives even began. An unknown number of these children would be abandoned by their fathers. They would grow up associated with defeat and death in their own country and regarded as a reminder of Japanese subordination to a western power.

=== Post-war government policy ===
Transition of numbers of registered foreigners in Japan

Because of the low importance placed on assimilating minorities in Japan, laws regarding ethnic matters receive low priority in the legislative process. Still, in 1997, "Ainu cultural revival" legislation was passed which replaced the previous "Hokkaido Former Aboriginal Protection" legislation that had devastating effects on the Ainu in the past.

Article 14 of the Constitution of Japan states that all people (English version) or citizens (revised Japanese version) are equal under the law, and they cannot be discriminated against politically, economically, or socially on the basis of race, belief, sex, or social or other background.

However, Japan does not have civil rights legislation which prohibits or penalizes discriminatory activities committed by citizens, businesses, or non-governmental organizations. In January 2024, three Japanese citizens, including a man of Pakistani descent, filed a civil lawsuit against the Japanese government, alleging a consistent pattern of racially motivated police harassment and requesting improved practices, along with approximately ¥3 million ($20,330) each in compensation. The uncommon lawsuit in Japan aims to demonstrate that racial discrimination violates the constitution and international human rights agreements. The plaintiffs, including two permanent residents and one foreign-born Japanese citizen, claim repeated unjustified stops and searches by the police based on their race, prompting concerns about the country's ability to address the increasing diversity resulting from a growing number of foreign workers. The lawsuit names the Japanese government, the Tokyo Metropolitan, and Aichi prefecture governments.

Attempts have been made in the Diet to enact human rights legislation. In 2002, a draft was submitted to the House of Representatives, but did not reach a vote. Had the law passed, it would have set up a Human Rights Commission to investigate, name and shame, or financially penalize discriminatory practices as well as hate speech committed by private citizens or establishments.

Another issue which has been publicly debated but has not received much legislative attention is whether to allow permanent residents to vote in local legislatures. Zainichi organizations affiliated with North Korea are against this initiative, while Zainichi organizations affiliated with South Korea support it.

Finally, there is debate about altering requirements for work permits to foreigners. As of 2022, the Japanese government does not issue work permits unless it can be demonstrated that the person has certain skills which cannot be provided by locals.

=== Comment by a U.N. special rapporteur on racism and xenophobia ===
In July 2005, a United Nations special rapporteur on racism and xenophobia expressed concerns about deep and profound racism in Japan and the Japanese government's insufficient recognition of the problem.

Doudou Diène (Special Rapporteur of the UN Commission on Human Rights) concluded after an investigation and nine-day tour of Japan that racial discrimination and xenophobia in Japan primarily affect three groups: national minorities, the descendants of people from former Japanese colonies, and foreigners from other Asian countries. John Lie, a professor at the University of California, Berkeley, believes that the widespread belief that Japan is an ethnically homogeneous society is inaccurate because Japan is a multiethnic society. Such claims have long been rejected by other sectors of Japanese society such as the former Japanese Prime Minister Tarō Asō, who once described Japan as a nation which is inhabited by people who are members of "one race, one civilization, one language and one culture".

While it expressed support for anti-discrimination efforts, Sankei Shimbun, a Japanese national newspaper, expressed doubt about the impartiality of the report, pointing out that Doudou Diène never visited Japan before and his short tour was arranged by a Japanese NGO, IMADR (International Movement Against All Forms of Discrimination). The chairman of the organization is Professor Kinhide Mushakoji (武者小路公秀), who is a board member (and the former director of the board) of the International Institute of the Juche Idea (主体思想国際研究所), an organization whose stated purpose is the propagation of Juche, the official ideology of North Korea.

In 2010, the UN Committee on the Elimination of Racial Discrimination criticized the lack of anti-hate speech legislation in the country and the treatment of Japanese minorities and its large Korean and Chinese communities. The Japan Times quoted committee member Regis de Gouttes as saying that there had been little progress since 2001 (when the last review was held) "There is no new legislation, even though in 2001 the committee said prohibiting hate speech is compatible with freedom of expression." Many members of the committee, however, praised the Japanese government's recent recognition of the Ainu as an indigenous people.

In February 2015, Ayako Sono, a former member of an educational reform panel, wrote a controversial column in Sankei Shimbun in which she suggested that more foreign workers should be imported in an attempt to alleviate labor shortages, but they should be separated from native Japanese with a system of apartheid. She later stated "I have never commended apartheid, but I do think that the existence of a 'Chinatown' or 'Little Tokyo' is a good thing."

== See also ==
- An Investigation of Global Policy with the Yamato Race as Nucleus
- Anti-Russian sentiment in Japan
- Antisemitism in Japan
- Eugenics in Japan
- Hakkō ichiu
- Japanese nationalism
- Japanese war crimes
- Statism in Shōwa Japan
- Manga Kenkanryu
- Minzoku
- Nippon Kaigi
- Gaijin
- Shina (word)
- Tōhōkai – a Japanese fascist political party which advocated Nazism
- Uyoku dantai
- Zaitokukai
- Kikokushijo returned children
- Racism by country
- Fascism in Asia
- Racism in Asia

== Bibliography ==
- 日本 戸口調査, 166-1875." Images. FamilySearch. http://FamilySearch.org : 14 June 2016. Ehime Prefecture Library, Matsuyama. Kyushu Historical Museum, Ogōri. Nara Prefecture Library.
- Japan Statistics Bureau Archived December 25, 2007, at the Wayback Machine, accessed December 8, 2007
- Central Intelligence Agency. (2016). Japan. In The world factbook. Retrieved from [https://web.archive.org/web/20260113000443/https://www.cia.gov/the-world-factbook/countries/japan/ The World Factbook] 4. Masami Ito (12 May 2009). "Between a rock and a hard place". The Japan Times. Retrieved 5 February 2017.
- Disturbing trend: Japanese protesters use Nazism to attack Chinese, Koreans". AJW by The Asahi Shimbun. Archived from the original on October 13, 2014. Retrieved October 13, 2014.
- Hohmann, S. (2008). "The Ainu's modern struggle". World Watch. 21 (6): 20–24.
- "Ainu". omniglot.com. 2009. Archived from the original on January 2, 2010. Retrieved August 2, 2009.
- Lewallen (2016). The fabric of indigeneity : Ainu identity, gender, and settler colonialism in Japan. Albuquerque: University of New Mexico Press. pp. 131–142. ISBN 978-0826357366.
- Tamura, Toshiyuki. "The Status and Role of Ethnic Koreans in the Japanese Economy" (PDF). Institute for International Economics. Retrieved November 19, 2017.
- OBA, Yoshio. "On Business History of Hokkaido Coal Mining and Shipping Corporation(3)". Hokkai-Gakuen Organization of Knowledge Ubiquitous through Gaining Archives. Retrieved October 6, 2020.
- Buraku Mondai in Japan: Historical and Modern Perspectives and Directions for the Future – Emily A. Su-lan Reber
- Tsutsui, Kiyoteru (2018-08-03). Rights Make Might: Global Human Rights and Minority Social Movements in Japan.
- Morris-Suzuki, Tessa (1998), "Becoming Japanese: Imperial Expansion and Identity Crises in the Early Twentieth Century", in Minichiello, Sharon (ed.), Japan's competing modernities: issues in culture and democracy, 1900–1930, University of Hawaii Press, pp. 157–180, ISBN 978-0-8248-2080-0
- Weiner, Michael (2004), Race, Ethnicity and Migration in Modern Japan: Imagined and imaginary minorities, Taylor and Francis, ISBN 978-0-415-20857-4
