= Tōhōkai =

Tōhōkai 東方会
- Leader: Nakano Seigō
- Founded: 25 May 1936
- Dissolved: 23 March 1944
- Split from: Kokumin Dōmei
- Headquarters: Tokyo
- Newspaper: Tōhō Jiron; Tōtairiku
- Ideology: Kokkashugi; Pro-Nazism
- Political position: Far-right
- Religion: State Shintō
- Colours: Black White Red

Party flag

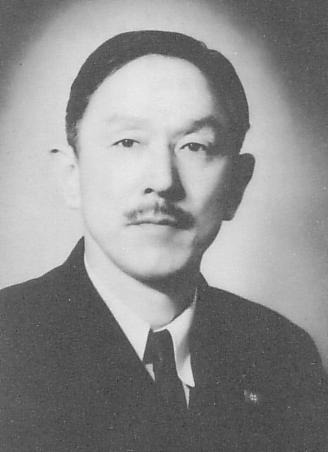
Nakano Seigō

Tōhōkai (東方会; Society of the East) was a Japanese fascist political party. The party was active in Japan during the 1930s and early 1940s. Its origins lay in the right-wing political organization Kokumin Domei which was formed by Adachi Kenzō in 1933. In 1936, Nakano Seigō disagreed with Adachi on of matters of policy and formed a separate group, which he called the 'Tōhōkai'.

== Ideology and development ==
Inspired by the writings of ultranationalist philosopher Kita Ikki, Nakano advocated national reform through parliamentary means rather than through a military coup d'état. Nakano turned to the Nazi movement of Adolf Hitler and the fascist movement of Benito Mussolini as examples of how radical right-wing political movements advocating corporatism could successfully take over a parliamentary democracy. The Tōhōkai used many of the trappings of the European movements it emulated, including the wearing of black shirts with armbands (bearing the Japanese character for 'East') and holding of mass rallies.

The programme of Tōhōkai was not a complete copy of the Western models, however, as the group was also driven by a deep-seated admiration for Saigō Takamori and the Satsuma Rebellion and was strongly monarchist in nature. The Tōhōkai also advocated an economic policy which it called 'social nationalism', one which was actually influenced by the ideas taken from the British Fabian Society rather than fascism. The group was also strong imperialist, with Nakano suggesting that Japan should "blast a way through Singapore to the Persian Gulf in order to link up with Nazi Germany directly". Tōhōkai won some popular support, and at its peak held eleven seats in the Diet of Japan in 1937.

Likewise, Tōhōkai rejected the notion of the superiority of the "Yamato race" and that it could legitimize Japanese dominance over other Asians. According to Tōkōhai, Japan's mission was to liberate and unite Asia, since according to them, continental Asians were brothers and equals to the Japanese and never inferior. At the same time, on several occasions Nakano Seigo harshly criticized other Pan-Asianists for their racism and hatred against white nations. He contrasted these points of reference with those of Sun Yat-sen, who was free of racism and ready to make common cause with ostracized European nations against imperial powers.

In 1939 the party actually entered into merger negotiations with Shakai Taishuto, a moderate left-wing party attracted to the left-leaning elements of Tōhōkai economic policy. Ultimately however the talks broke down, both because Nakano insisted on leading any merged party and because many members of Shakai Taishuto considered Tōhōkai to be a fascist party. It has subsequently been argued that Tōhōkai bears comparison to the left-wing of the Nazi party as typified by Ernst Röhm and others largely eliminated in the Night of the Long Knives.

== Merger and decline ==
In October 1940, the Tōhōkai merged into the Imperial Rule Assistance Association as part of Fumimaro Konoe's effort to create a one-party state. It broke away in 1941 as it felt that Konoe had not established the European-style totalitarian party of state that they desired, although their anti-British and anti-American propaganda meant that the government did little to curtail their activities as they did with other parties. As a result, the Tōhōkai was allowed to field 46 candidates in the 1942 general election. Seven members of the party were re-elected and Nakano continued as a critic of the government, berating Konoe and Hideki Tōjō for not following the path of Adolf Hitler more closely.

In October 1943, Nakano was arrested along with 39 other members of the party on charges of plotting to overthrow the Tōjō regime, and he committed suicide under mysterious circumstances the night after he was released on bail. As with many similar movements based on a single charismatic leader, the Tōhōkai largely dissolved after Nakano's death and was formally disbanded on 23 March 1944. It was officially banned in 1945 by the American Occupation Authorities.

== Legacy ==
After the Occupation of Japan, the Tōhōkai was revived by former members, and is now a minor ultranationalist group headquartered in Kurume, Fukuoka Prefecture. The National Socialist Japanese Workers and Welfare Party also claims to be a successor to the Tōhōkai and sometimes uses its symbols.

== Election results ==
Election year	Votes		Seats	Change
Election year	Number	Percentage	Seats	Change
1937	221,455	2.17%	11 / 466	Steady
