= Volunteer Army Unit for Punishing Traitors =

Japanese ultranationalist group (2002–2003)

- 建国義勇軍国賊征伐隊
- Other name: Volunteer Army Unit for Punishing Koreans
- Leader: Ichiro Murakami
- Dates active: October 23, 2002–December 19, 2003
- Active regions: Japan
- Ideology: Japanese nationalism Ultranationalism
- Status: Defunct
- Size: At least 14 members

The Voluntary Army Unit for Punishing Traitors (建国義勇軍国賊征伐隊, Kenkoku giyūgun kokuzoku seibatsutai), or simply Kenkoku giyūgun or Kokuzoku seibatsutai, was an armed Japanese nationalist group founded in 2002 by Ichiro Murakami.

== History ==
Between November 2002 and December 2003, the group carried out 23 attacks in Japan, bomb threats, arson attempts, and gun attacks against buildings which resulted in damaged walls and smashed windows.

Targets included offices of the Japan Teachers' Union, Osaka and Tokyo buildings used by the terrorist cult Aum Shinrikyo (which had perpetrated the 1995 Tokyo subway sarin attack), the pro-North Korea Chongryon association, and the only threat taken seriously by Japanese law enforcement, Deputy Minister of Foreign Affairs Hitoshi Tanaka, who had attempted rapprochement with North Korea in 2002.

The group ceased to exist on 19 December 2003 with the arrest of Ichiro Murakami and 12 other members, for violating gun- and sword-control laws.

Ichirō Murakami ran a business in Gifu selling knives and swords from 1977, and was an amateur collector of Japanese swords. He decided to act after viewing a TV report in October 2002 about Japanese hostages who had recently been released from North Korea after decades of captivity. According to the Asahi Shimbun newspaper, he was "a brave Japanese patriot who could not allow North Korea to get away with it". Murakami was also highly critical of modern Japanese society, denouncing "this strange existence, like goldfish in an ocean with primitive desires only for sex and food".

Murakami recruited members to his group from his collectors' association, Token tomo no kai (The Sword-Lovers' Society), of which he was the president, and among other sword collectors. In the association's monthly newsletter, which he used as a recruitment tool, Murakami once wrote "This is a group of modern Samurai, hoping to do everything in their power to make Japan a truly independent nation" and "We must march into battle under the banner of anti-Communism, anti-Americanism and anti-socialism." The group claimed to have 30,000 members, asserting that all sword buyers were actually members of his collector's association.

Following Murakami's arrest, one of the group's members committed suicide in Osaka by jumping from a bridge after ritually taking off his shoes.

Murakami had some friends in politics, including Shingo Nishimura, former deputy of the Democratic Party of Japan and later of the New Renaissance Party, who was known for being highly critical of North Korea. Following his visit to one of the Senkaku Islands, Nishimura had been chosen to be a top advisor of Murakami's collectors' association. Nishimura had appeared on the front page of a famous sword magazine, and Murakami had donated 2 million yen to his political campaign. Following his re-election to the Diet in November 2003, Nishimura had thanked Murakami for his support, addressing him a letter that ended with the words "Banzai Japan! Banzai Japanese spirit! Banzai Japanese swords!"

After Murakami's arrest, Nishimura declared that he had no knowledge of any criminal activities, but that he supported Murakami's cause.

=== Known members ===
- Ichirō Murakami, 54, director of the Nihon Rejin company
- Tatsuya Hattori, 40, director of the Sword-Lovers Association
- Takahiro Azabu, 38, worked as Murakami's secretary
- Fumio Nonoyama, 52, worked in the Japanese sword business and was a business acquaintance of Murakami's

== Known Attacks ==
- 23 October 2002: Murakami confessed to the police that he had attempted to burn down a Chongryon office in Fukui prefecture.
- November 2002: Threatening letters containing bullets were sent to the Chongryon office in Tokyo.
- 29 May 2002: Shots were fired at an Aum Shinrikyo building in Suginami, Tokyo.
- 13 June 2002: Shots were fired at an Aum Shinrikyo building in Osaka.
- 27 June 2002: Tatsuya Hattori fired shots at the Japan Teachers' Union prefectural headquarters in Hiroshima, following the suicide in March of a school principal in Onomichi, Hiroshima.
- 29 July 2002: A .38-calibre pistol was fired at the Chongryon headquarters in Niigata.
- 23 August 2002: A .38-calibre pistol was fired at the Okayama office of the Chogin Nishi Credit Union, a pro-North Korean financial organization.
- September 2003: After an anonymous phone call, a bomb was found at the home of Deputy Foreign Affairs Minister Hitoshi Tanaka, who was then responsible for Japan's relations with North Korea. The bomb was accompanied by a letter denouncing Tanaka as a traitor for his soft line on North Korea. The influential and famous Tokyo governor Shintaro Ishihara criticized Tanaka's policies and argued that the bomb threat was justified.
- A rifle bullet was posted to Hiromu Nonaka, former secretary-general of the Liberal Democratic Party.
- A rifle bullet was posted to Muneo Suzuki, former deputy in the House of Representatives.
- October 2003: A man claiming to be a member of the "Volunteer Army Unit for Punishing Traitors" phoned the Tokyo head office of Asahi Shimbun, claiming that he had fired a gun at a local office of the Japan Teachers' Union in Kunitachi, western Tokyo, and planted a bomb at its head office (a fake bomb was later found there).

== See also ==
- Sekihōtai
- Chūkaku-ha
