= Uyoku dantai =

Ultranationalist far-right groups in Japan

Uyoku dantai (右翼団体; lit. 'right-wing groups') are extreme Japanese nationalist and far-right activists and provocateurs, often organized in groups. In 1996 and 2013, the National Police Agency estimated that there were over 1,000 right-wing groups in Japan, with about 100,000 members in total.

== Philosophies and activities ==
Uyoku dantai are well known for their highly visible propaganda vehicles, known as gaisensha (街宣車). These converted vans, trucks and buses are fitted with loudspeakers and prominently marked with the name of the group and propaganda slogans. The vehicles are usually black, khaki or olive drab, and are decorated with the Imperial Seal, the flag of Japan and the Rising Sun Flag. They are primarily used to stage protests outside organizations such as the Chinese, Korean or Russian embassies, Chongryon facilities and media organizations, where propaganda (both taped and live) is broadcast through their loudspeakers. They can sometimes be seen driving around cities or parked in busy shopping areas, broadcasting propaganda, military music or Kimigayo, the national anthem. The Greater Japan Patriotic Party, supportive of the US–Japan–South Korea alliance against China and North Korea and against communism as a whole, displays the US national flag flying side by side with the Japanese flag in the vehicles and US military marches played alongside their Japanese counterparts. Rightwing groups doing public propaganda such as using the vans are known as gaisen uyoku (街宣右翼).

While political beliefs differ among the groups, they are often said to hold in common three philosophies: the advocation of kokutai-Goji (retaining the fundamental character of the nation), hostility towards communism and Marxism, and hostility against the Japan Teachers' Union. Traditionally, they view Russia (and previously the Soviet Union), China, and North Korea with hostility over issues such as communism, the Senkaku (Diaoyu) Islands and the Kuril Islands, and the kidnappings of Japanese citizens by North Korea.

Most, but not all, seek to justify Japan's role in the Second World War to varying degrees, deny the war crimes committed by the military during the pre-1945 Shōwa period and are critical of what they see as a "masochistic" bias in post-war historical education. Thus, they do not recognize the legality of the International Military Tribunal for the Far East or other allied tribunals and consider the war-criminals enshrined in the Yasukuni Shrine as "Martyrs of Shōwa" (昭和殉難者, Shōwa junnansha). They support the censorship of history textbooks, or historical negationism.

=== Categories of uyoku dantai ===
Uyoku dantai are broadly classed into currents based on ideological perspective and foundation period. They are divided into traditional (pre-war), street activist (originating in the post-war era), New Right or Minzoku-ha, and Kōdō-suru Hoshu (Action Conservative Movement) groups.

- Traditional or pre-war groups trace their origins to the pre-war radical Right, and have a traditionalist and nationalist outlook. The representatives of this current today are the Great Eastern School (Daitōjuku 大東塾) and Great Japan Production Party (Dainippon Seisantō 大日本生産党)
- Activist groups which are mainly known for street activities through noise trucks, sometimes known as Gaisen Uyoku (街宣右翼). Some (but not all) are believed to have Yakuza links. Ideologically they are ultranationalist, monarchist, militarist, anti-Communist and in favour of a pro-Western alliance. Many also support Taiwan and South Korea. The Great Japan Patriotic Party (Dainippon Aikokutō 大日本愛国党) is one of the most prominent representatives of this current.
- New right (Shin-uyoku 新右翼) or Minzoku-ha (民族派) originated in the student movements of the 1960s and 1970s, many of whom were followers of Yukio Mishima. They rejected the assumptions of existing uyoku groups and adopted an anti-American and broadly anti-Western line, as well as a Turanist line, which supposedly unites the Japanese people with the Koreans, the Uralic-speaking, the Turkic-speaking, the Mongolic-speaking, and the Tungusic-speaking peoples. The most representative groups of this current are Issuikai (一水会) and United Volunteers Front.
- Action Conservative (Kōdō-suru Hoshu; 行動する保守) groups are more recent in origin and are known for their vocal street activities. These groups tend towards anti-Korean, anti-Chinese and anti-Russian rhetoric. Examples of this trend are Zaitokukai (在特会), Ishin Seito Shimpu (維新政党・新風), Japan National Party (日本国民党), Japan First Party (日本第一党) and Shuken kaifuku o mezasu kai (主権回復を目指す会).

== Groups ==
=== Historical groups ===
- Aikokusha (愛国社, "Society of Patriots") – set up in 1928 by Ainosuke Iwata. (Not to be confused with an 1875–1880 organization of the same name). Activities included organization of anti-communist student movements in various universities and indoctrination of youths in rural villages. On 14 November 1930, Tomeo Sagoya, a member of the society shot Prime Minister Hamaguchi Osachi at Tokyo Station in an assassination attempt.
- Genyōsha (玄洋社, "Black Ocean Society") – originated from a secret society of former samurai, with an aim to restore feudal rule, later turned to pan-Asianist concepts, but actually Genyōsha was an ultranationalist secret society. They engaged in terrorist activities such as the attempted assassination of Ōkuma Shigenobu in 1889. It formed an extensive espionage and organized crime network throughout East Asia and agitated for Anti-Western sentiment with Japan's military aggression. It was forced to disband after World War II.
- Kokuryūkai (黑龍會, "Black Dragon Society") – an influential paramilitary group set up in 1901, initially to support the effort to drive Russia out of East Asia. They ran anti-Russian espionage networks in Korea, China, Manchuria, and Russia. Expanded its activities worldwide in the subsequent decades and became a small but significant ultranationalist force in mainstream politics. Forced to disband in 1946.
- Kenkokukai (建国会, "National Foundation Society") – an ultranationalist secret society founded in April 1926. It was formed by the Nazi sympathizer Motoyuki Takabatake along with right-wing ultranationalists Shinkichi Uesugi and future Aikokutō leader Bin Akao. It proclaimed its object to be "the creation of a genuine people's state based on unanimity between the people and the emperor".
- Sakurakai (桜会, "Cherry Blossom Society") – an ultranationalist secret society established by young officers within the Imperial Japanese Army in September 1930, with the goal of reorganizing the state along totalitarian militaristic lines, via a military coup d'état if necessary.

=== Traditional groups ===
- Daitōjuku (大東塾, "Great Eastern School") – a cultural academy set up in 1939. Runs courses related to Shinto and traditional arts such as waka (poetry) and karate. Conducted several campaigns, such as the restoration of the National Foundation Day's original status of kigensetsu ("Empire Day") and of the legal designation of Japanese era names as Japan's official calendar.
- Greater Japan Patriotic Party (大日本愛国党, Dai-nippon aikokuto) – set up in 1951 by, and centred around, Bin Akao, a former anti-war member of the pre-war National Diet who was well known at the time for his daily speeches at Sukiyabashi crossing in Ginza, Tokyo. The party advocated state ownership of industries with the Emperor as the chief executive officer of the Japanese government. They emphasized the need for solidarity with the United States and South Korea in the fight against communism. Their propaganda vans were decorated with the Stars and Stripes alongside the Japanese flag, and Akao once stated that Liancourt Rocks (Dokdo/Takeshima) should be blown up as it represents an obstacle to friendship with South Korea. A former party member, Otoya Yamaguchi, was responsible for the 1960 assassination of Inejirō Asanuma, the head of the Japanese Socialist Party, at a televised rally.
- Issuikai (一水会) – formed in 1972 as part of what was then known as the "new right-wing" movement which rejected the pro-American rhetoric of the traditional right wing. It sees the Japanese government as an American puppet state and demands "complete independence". Advocates the setting up of a new United Nations on the basis that the current UN structure is a relic of the Second World War. Fiercely critical of the Bush Administration over issues such as the Iraq War and the Kyoto Protocol.

=== Groups affiliated with yakuza syndicates ===
- Nihon Seinensha (日本青年社, "Japan Youth Society") – one of the largest organizations with 2,000 members. Set up by the Sumiyoshi-ikka syndicate in 1961. Since 1978, members have constructed two lighthouses and a Shinto shrine on the Senkaku Islands (Diaoyutai), a collection of uninhabited islets claimed by Japan, China and Taiwan. In June 2000, two members of the society attacked the offices of a magazine which ran a headline which was allegedly disrespectful to then-Crown Princess Masako.
- Nihon Kōmintō (日本皇民党, "Japan Emperor's People Party") – affiliated to the Inagawa-kai syndicate. In 1987, it conducted a bizarre campaign to smear Noboru Takeshita during his quest for the position of Prime Minister, by constantly broadcasting excessive praise of Takeshita using twenty loudspeaker trucks. The broadcasts were stopped after the intervention of Shin Kanemaru. This incident led to a series of political scandals which eventually highlighted the involvement of organized crime in the ruling Liberal Democratic Party. In April 2004, a bus belonging to the group rammed the gate of the Chinese consulate in Osaka, damaging the gate. Police arrested Nobuyuki Nakagama, the driver, and Ko Chong-Su, a Korean member of the group, for orchestrating the attack.
- Taikōsha (大行社, "Great Enterprise Society") – a Tokyo-based organization, officially affiliated to the Inagawa-kai syndicate.
- Shōkon Juku (松魂塾) – a Tokyo-based organization, officially affiliated to the Kyokuto-kai syndicate. The founder and chief advisor is Shinichi Matsuyama (Cho Kyu-Hwa), a Korean who is also the 5th generation leader of Kyokuto-kai.

=== Other groups ===
- Seikijuku (正氣塾, "Sane Thinkers School") – a group based in Nagasaki Prefecture set up in 1981. Responsible for a number of violent incidents, including the 1991 near-fatal shooting of the mayor of Nagasaki, who stated that emperor Hirohito was responsible for the war.
- Yūkoku Dōshikai (憂国道志会) – an extreme nationalist party. The group set fire to Ichirō Kōno's house in 1963. The members were armed with guns and katana, took eight hostages, and barricaded themselves in Japan Business Federation's office in 1977. Its leader Shūsuke Nomura had admired Korean nationalist An Jung-geun as a patriot. On the 37th election of assembly members of the House of Representatives (1983), when a secretary of Shintarō Ishihara defamed his opposition candidate Shōkei Arai (Bak Gyeong-jae) as a "Korean", the party protested hard against Ishihara.
- National Socialist Japanese Workers' Party (国家社会主義日本労働者党, Kokka Shakaishugi Nippon Rōdōsha-Tō) – a small neo-Nazi party headed by Kazunari Yamada, who maintains a website and blog which includes praise for Adolf Hitler and the September 11 attacks. Pictures of Yamada, a Holocaust denier, posing with Cabinet minister Sanae Takaichi and LDP policy research chief Tomomi Inada were discovered on the website and became a source of controversy; both have denied support for the party.
- Nippon Kaigi (日本会議, "Japan Conference") – a Japanese ultranationalist and ultraconservative group who seeks the revision of the Japanese constitution and the revision of Japanese history textbooks to whitewash Japan's actions during World War II.
- Zaitokukai (在日特権を許さない市民の会, "Association of Citizens against the Special Privileges of the Zainichi") – a Japanese nationalist and anti-immigration group who calls for the removal of state welfare and alleged privileges to Zainichi Koreans. They are anti-Korean, anti-Russian and anti-Chinese. It has been described by the National Police Agency as a potential threat to public order due to its "extreme nationalist and xenophobic" ideology.
- Japan First Party (日本第一党, Nippon Daiittō) – an alt-right party founded by the original leader of Zaitokukai Makoto Sakurai.

== Gallery ==
=== Gaishenshas ===
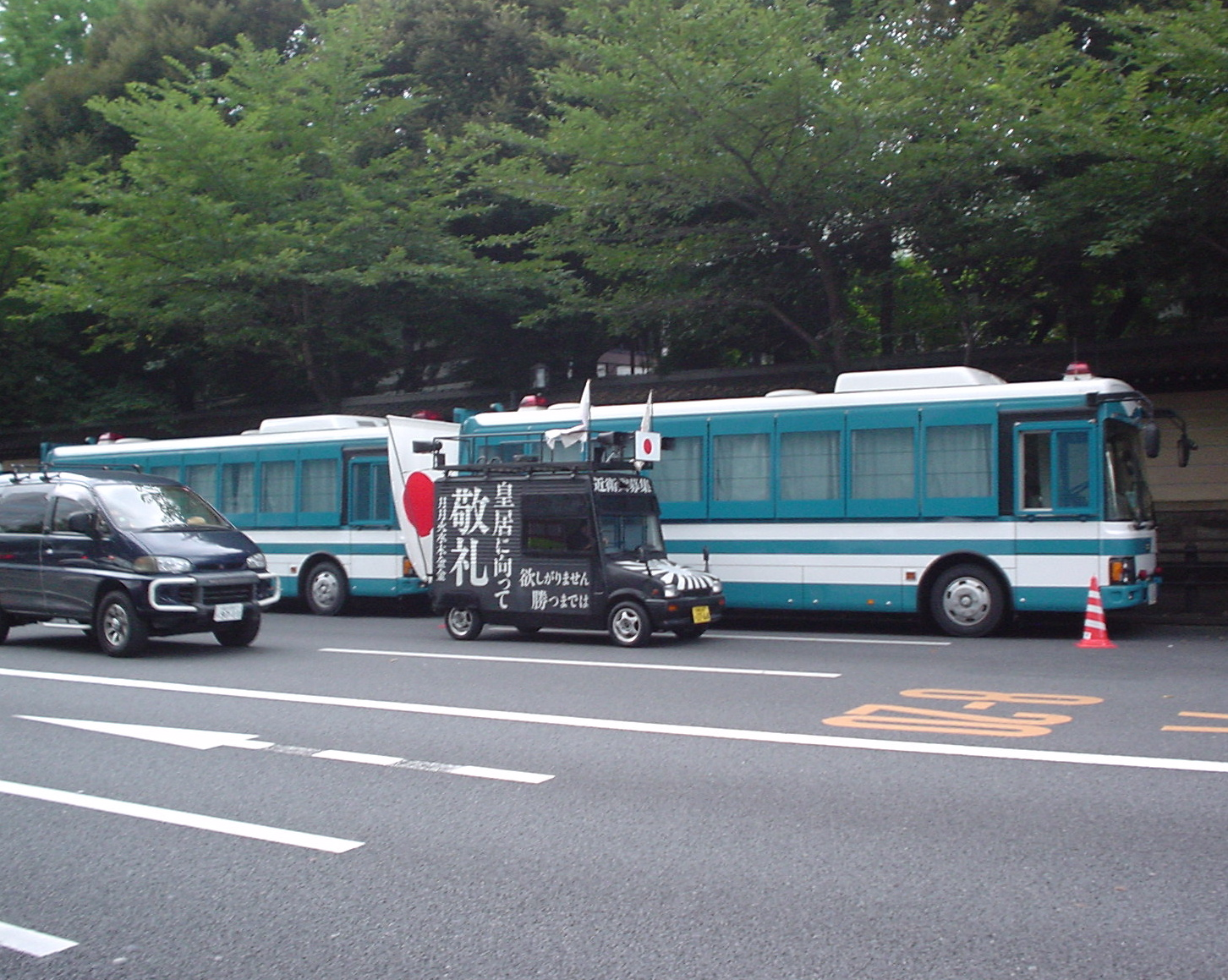
An uyoku gaisensha passing two Tokyo Metropolitan Police Department police buses

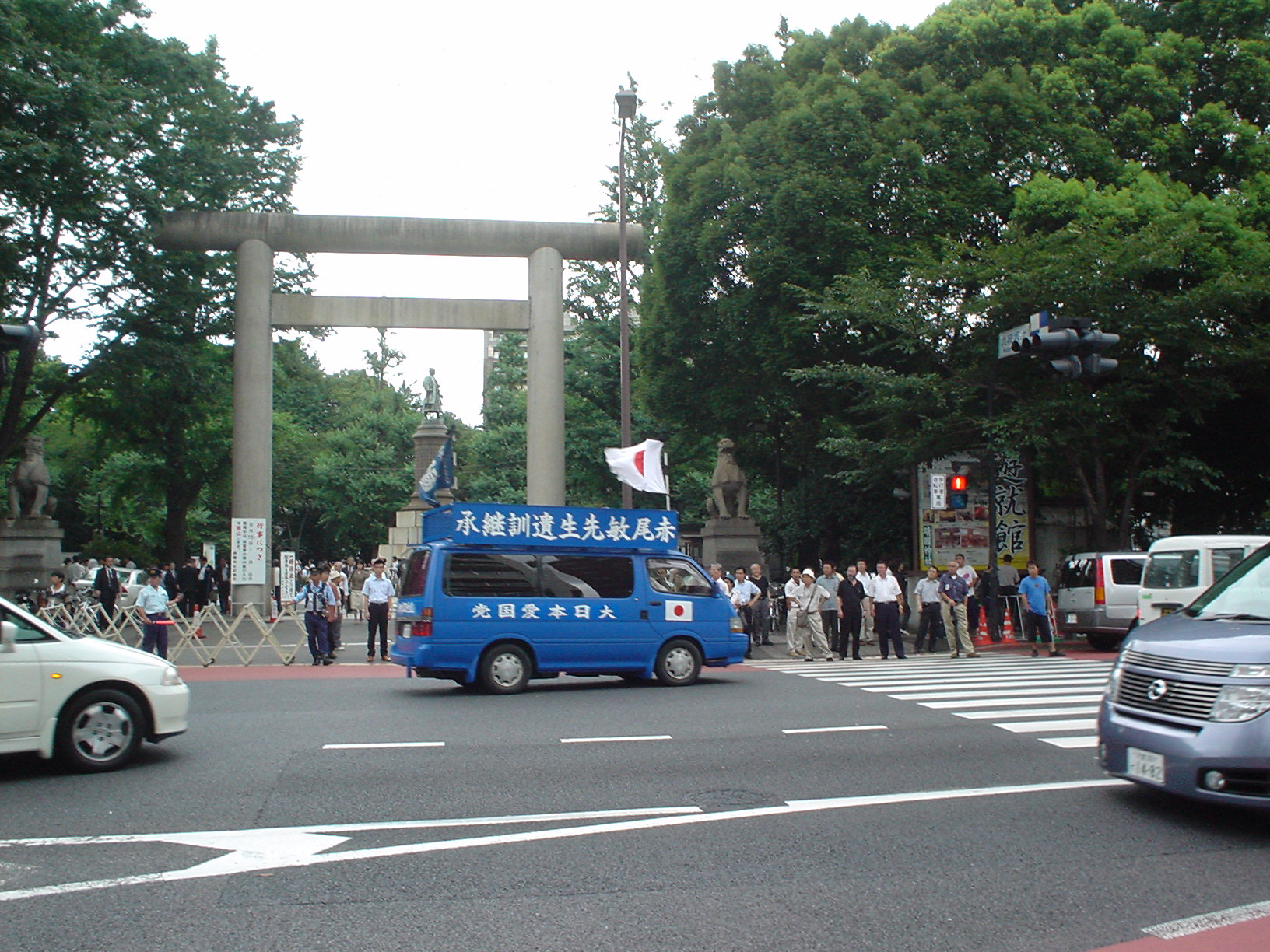
A gaisensha driving around the street at the Yasukuni Shrine on August 15, the V-J Day

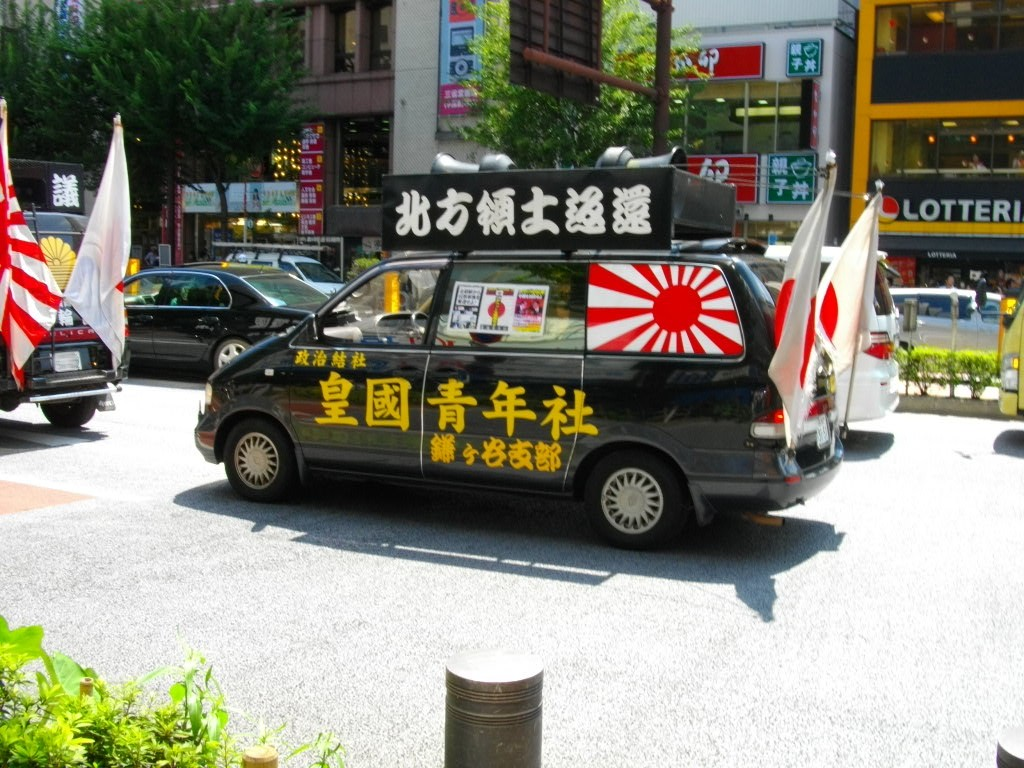
A uyoku gaisensha propagandizing with the Rising Sun Flag

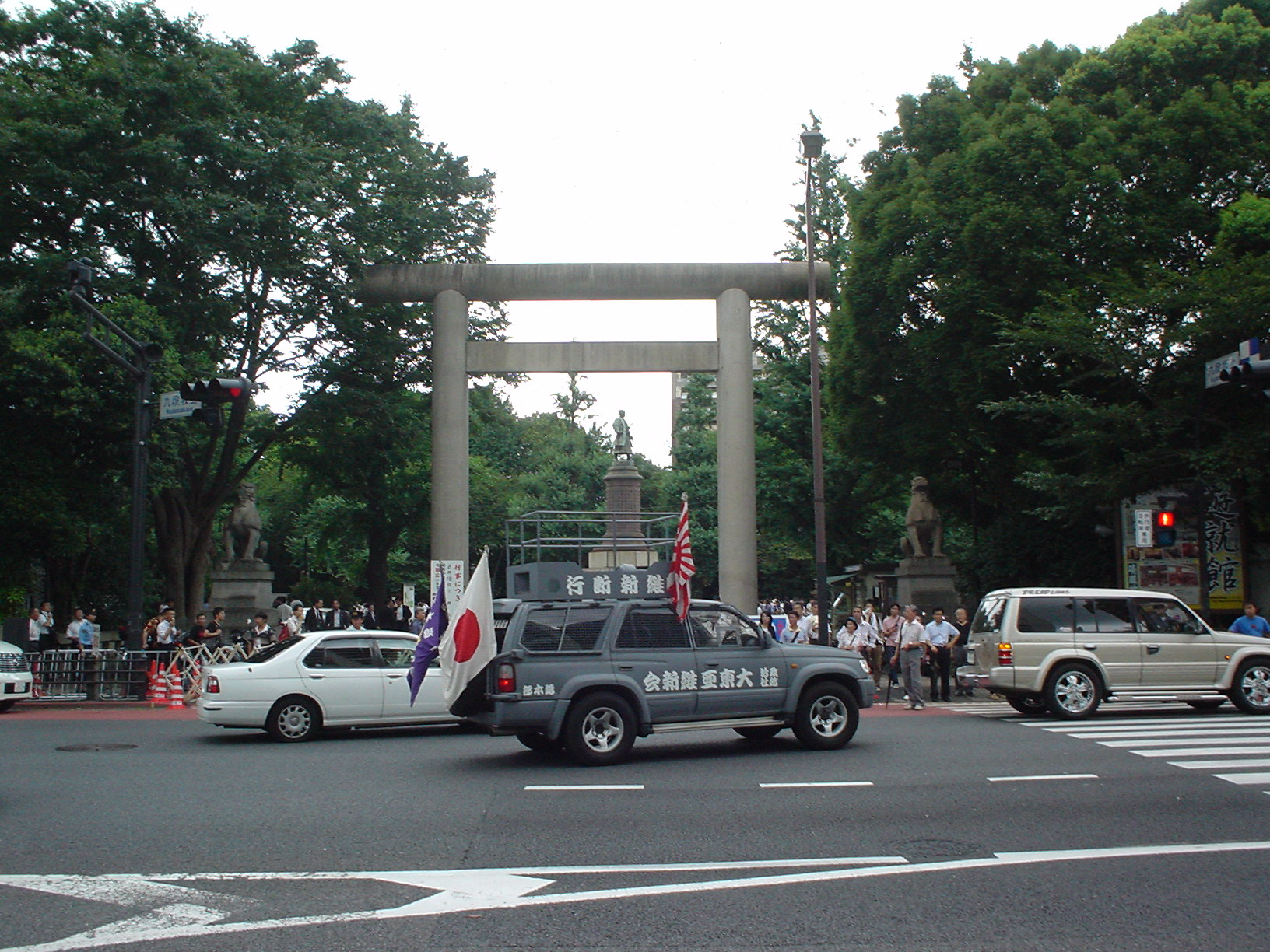
Another example of an uyoku gaisensha, again in front of the Yasukuni Shrine

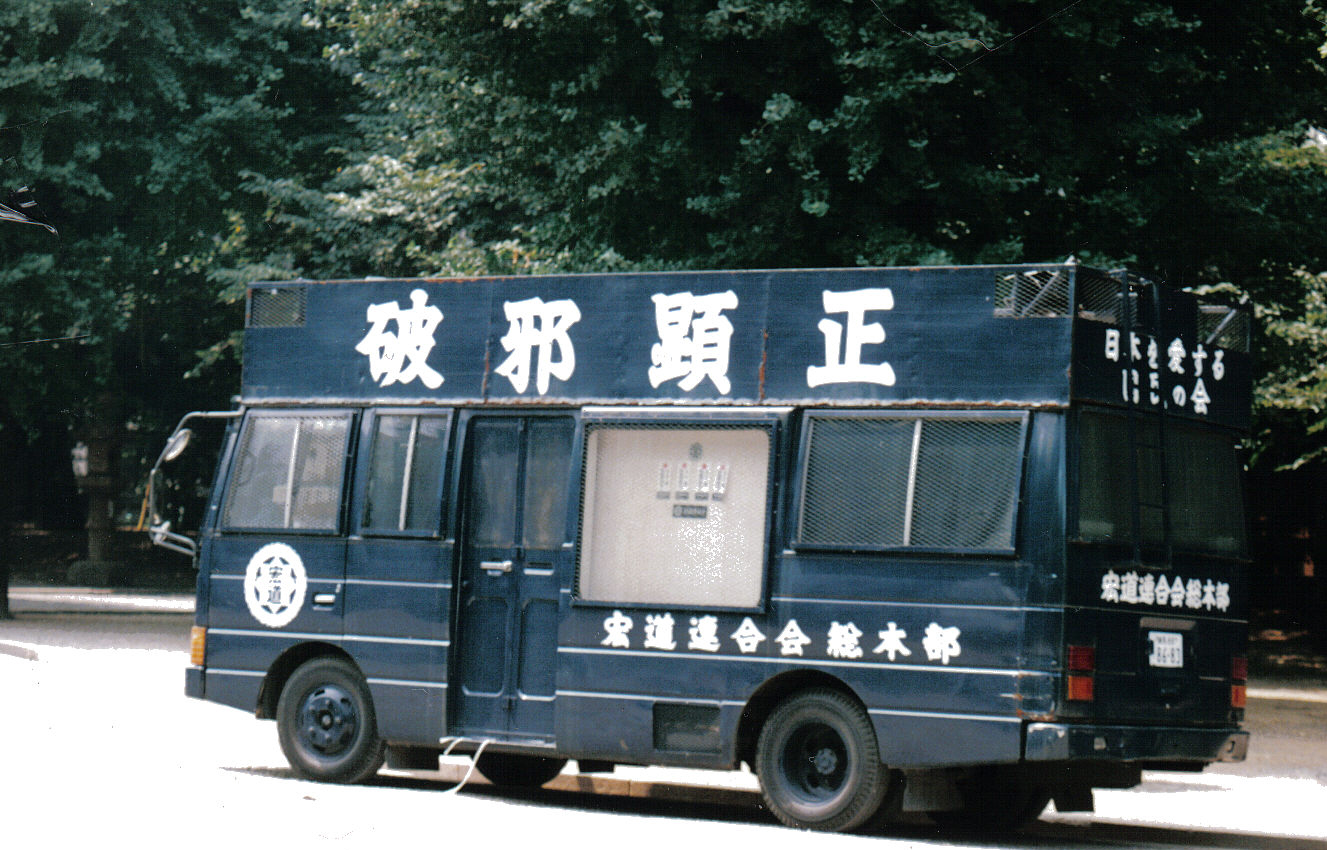
Uyoku bus parked on the grounds of Yasukuni Shrine

=== Demonstrations ===
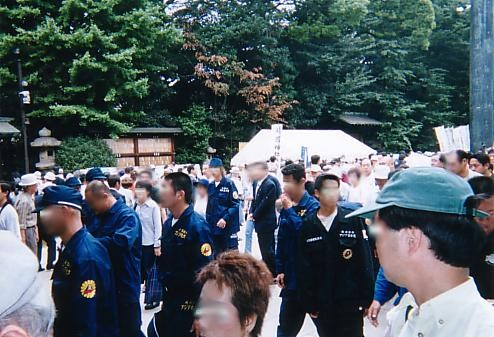
Asia Seinen To activists in 2001

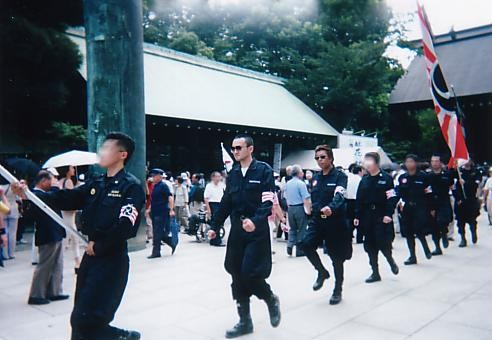
Minzoku no Ishi Domei activists in 2001

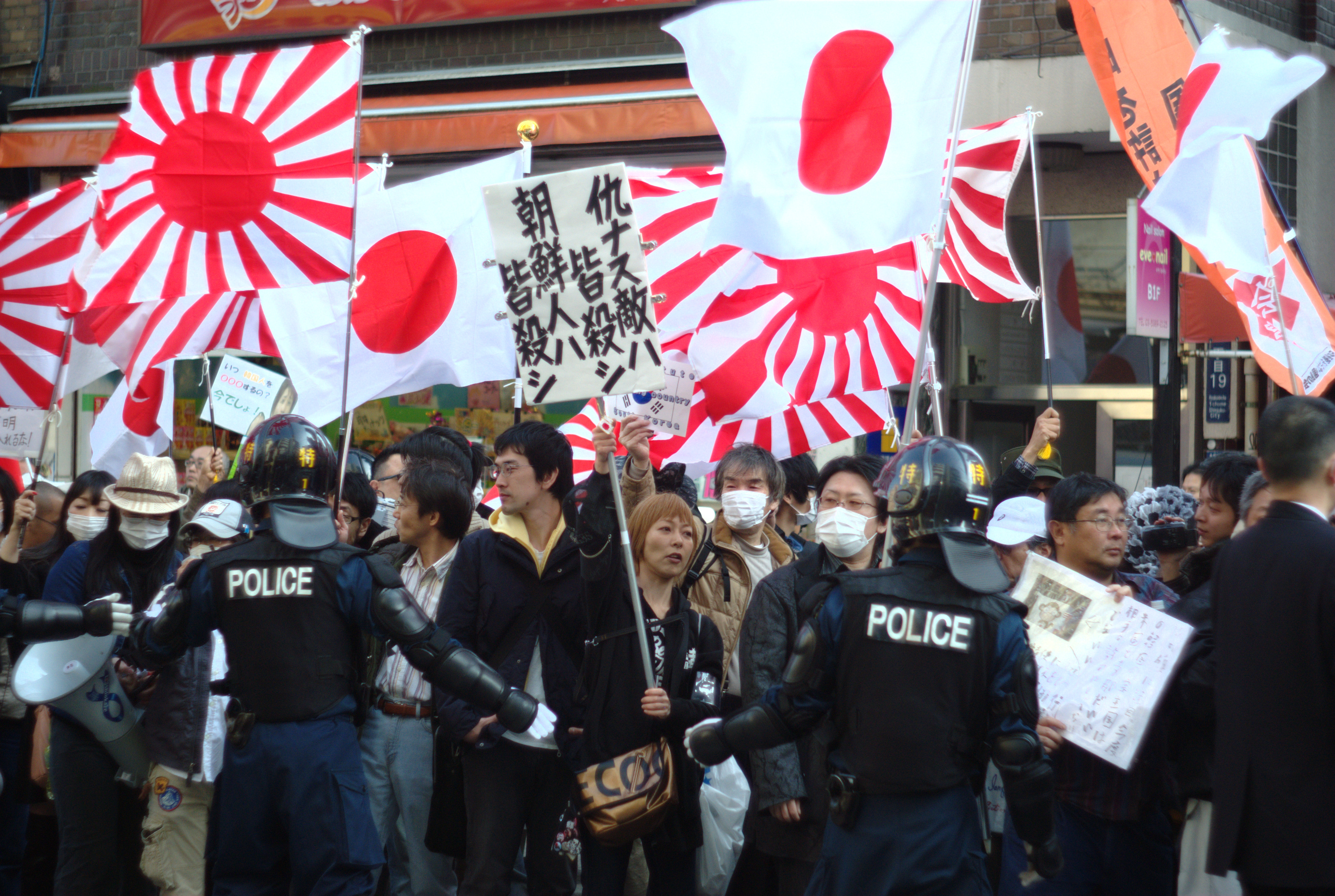
A Zaitokukai demonstration in Tokyo in 2013

== See also ==
- Conservative Party of Japan
- Ethnic nationalism in Japan
- Japanese history textbook controversies
- Liberal Democratic Party
- Manga Kenkanryu
- Para-fascism
- Racism in Japan
- Sanseitō
- Sound trucks in Japan
- Ultraconservatism
- Ultranationalism (Japan)
- Volunteer Army Unit for Punishing Traitors
