= Seikijuku =

Japanese far-right political extremist organization

Seikijuku (正氣塾; "Sane Thinkers School") is a far right Japanese imperialist group based in Nagasaki Prefecture, founded in 1981. The group was responsible for a number of violent incidents, including the 1990 near-fatal shooting of the mayor of Nagasaki Hitoshi Motoshima who stated that Emperor Shōwa was responsible for the war. In 1984, the group disrupted a Fuji TV recording session with flares.

== See also ==
- Political extremism in Japan
- Uyoku dantai

== Sources ==
- World Notes Japan Time. 24 Jun 2001.
