= Zaitokukai =

Japanese far-right organization

- 在日特権を許さない市民の会
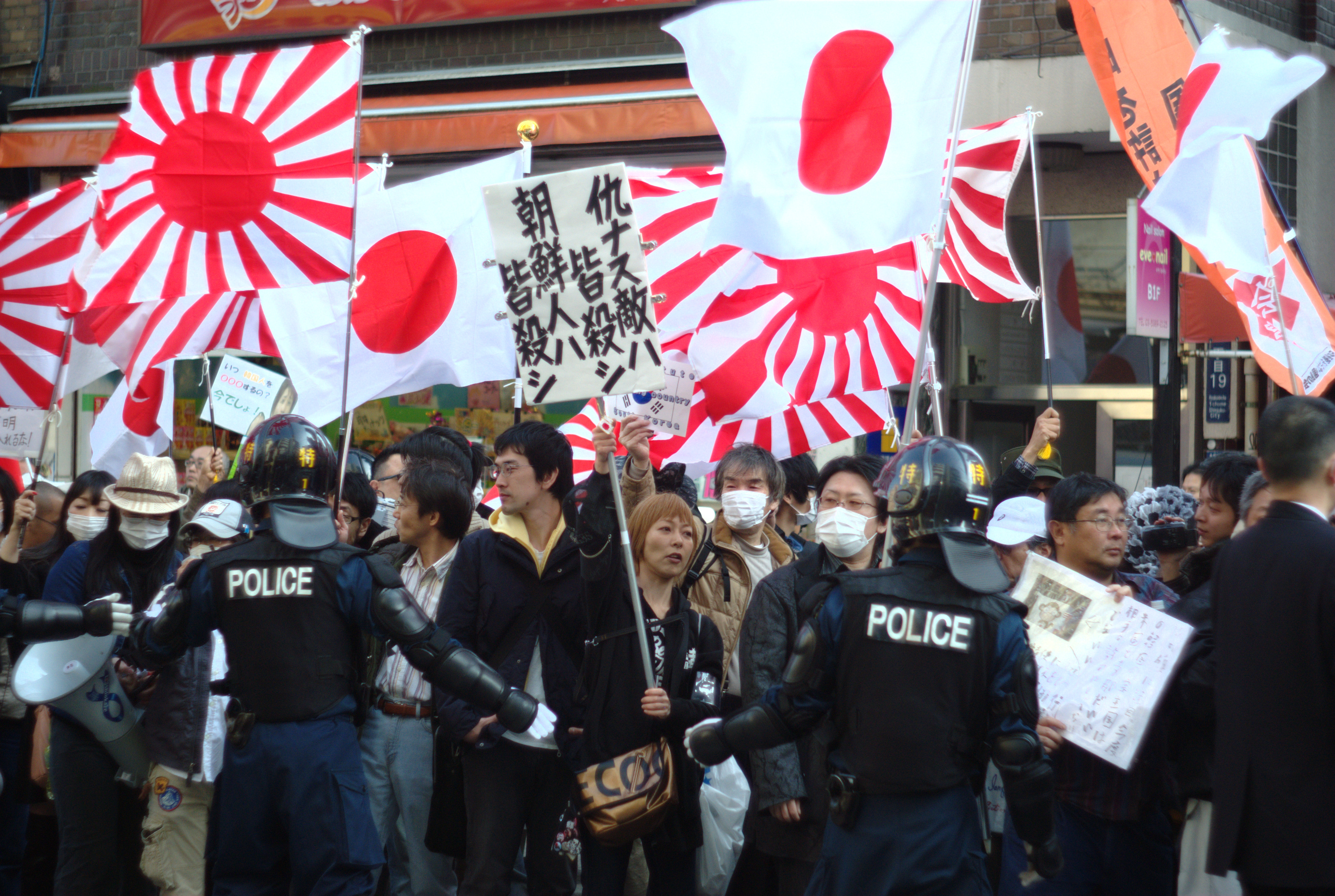
- A demonstration by Zaitokukai against Koreans in Japan took place in Tokyo in 2013. A woman carries a placard written "Kill all Koreans".
- Leader: Yasuhiro Yagi
- Dates active: 2007–present
- Active regions: Japan
- Ideology: Anti-Korean xenophobia; Ethnic nationalism (Japanese); Ultranationalism; Anti-immigration; Right-wing populism; Reactionism
- Political position: Far-right
- Status: Designated as a potential threat to law and order by the NPA due to their "extreme nationalist and xenophobic" ideology.

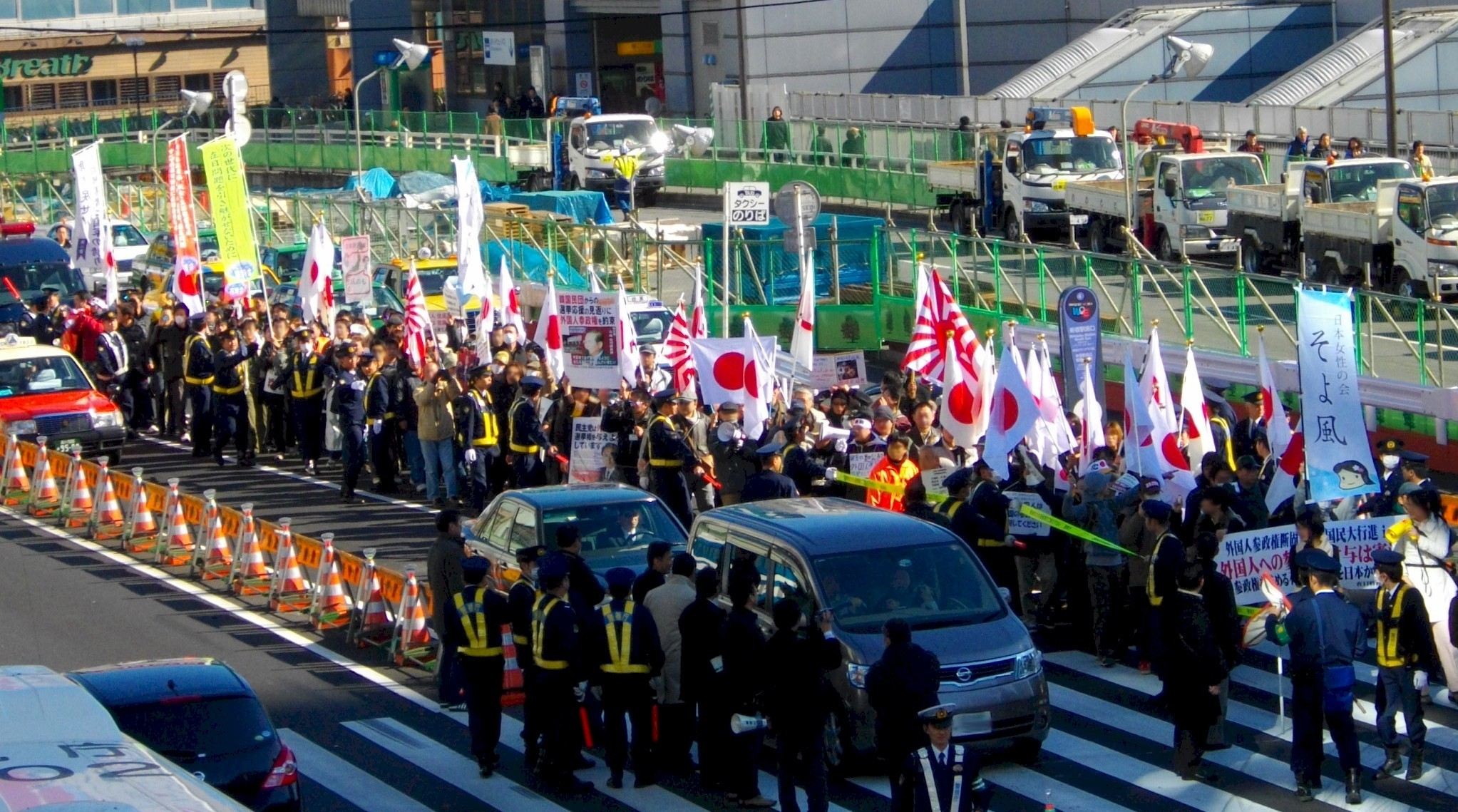
Zaitokukai demonstrating in support of withholding the right of non-citizens to vote in Shinjuku on January 24, 2010

Zaitokukai, full name Zainichi Tokken o Yurusanai Shimin no Kai (在日特権を許さない市民の会; lit. 'Association of Citizens against the Special Privileges of the Zainichi'), is an ultra-nationalist and far-right extremist political organization in Japan, which calls for an end to state welfare and alleged privileges afforded to Koreans in Japan. It has been described by the National Police Agency as a potential threat to public order due to its "extreme nationalist and xenophobic" ideology.

Its membership is 9,000 as of 2010. Vice News called them "J-racism's hottest new upstarts" in 2014. The group is considered by critics to be an anti-Korean extremist hate group, and have been compared to neo-Nazis.

It was founded and led by a man who goes by the assumed name of Makoto Sakurai. On November 16, 2014, Yasuhiro Yagi was selected as chairman for the fifth term as the result of a vote of confidence by the group's members.

Sharon Yoon and Yuki Asahina argue that Zaitokukai quickly succeeded in framing Korean minorities as undeserving recipients of Japanese welfare benefits. Even as Zaitokukai declined, far-right anti-Korean discourse powerfully influences public fears.

== History ==
=== Foundation ===
Zaitokukai was founded on December 2, 2006, and held its inaugural meeting in January 2007.

Sakurai founded Zaitokukai after seeing a TV news report on a group of Japanese citizens organizing to support the Zainichi Koreans who brought a lawsuit to obtain national pensions without making any premium payments. Sakurai was disturbed by the fact that there were Japanese who backed the suit which he thought could destroy the Japanese pension system. He then searched for a conservative political organization fighting against what he regarded as an extraordinary demand of Zainichi Koreans, but could find none. He then decided to establish Zaitokukai.

=== Activities ===
The group has been protesting against the extension of suffrage to non-citizen foreign nationals. In September 2009, it held a demonstration in Akihabara calling for the resistance to granting suffrage to non-citizen foreign nationals with about 1,000 participants, according to Sakurai himself. Some time before that, Zaitokukai held a counter-protest against a demonstration by more than 3,000 in Ginza, Tokyo, organized by Mindan (the Korean Residents Union in Japan) to extend suffrage to foreigners.

The group involves themselves extensively on social media.

Several members of the group made donations to the political funding organization of Tomomi Inada between 2010 and 2012.

== Agenda ==
Zaitokukai alleges that Zainichi Koreans have special legal rights granted to them through the process of their integration into the Japanese society. It claims that members of this ethnic group use "pass names" that are Japanese-style and often very different from their original Korean names to abuse welfare and administrative systems. Members of the group also believe that it is much easier for Zainichi Koreans to claim and receive welfare benefits than it is for Japanese citizens, causing serious problems in the entire welfare system in Japan to the detriment of Japanese citizens. It accuses Zainichi Koreans of cheating the tax system as well, claiming that Zainichi Koreans pay reduced amounts for many taxes, including income tax, corporate tax, and council tax. It argues that Zainichi Koreans wrongfully claim those rights by saying that they are a deprived and discriminated minority in Japanese society.

In pursuit of its goals, Zaitokukai has set an ultimate goal of repealing the Special Act on Immigration Control (入管特例法) which gives Zainichi Koreans special permanent residence status which can never be granted to other foreign nationals. The first chairman Sakurai declared in his book that Zaitokukai would be dissolved when the Special Act on Immigration Control is repealed. The second chairman, Yasuhiro Yagi, also affirmed in his inauguration message that Zaitokukai's ultimate objective is to annul the said Act.

== Criticism ==
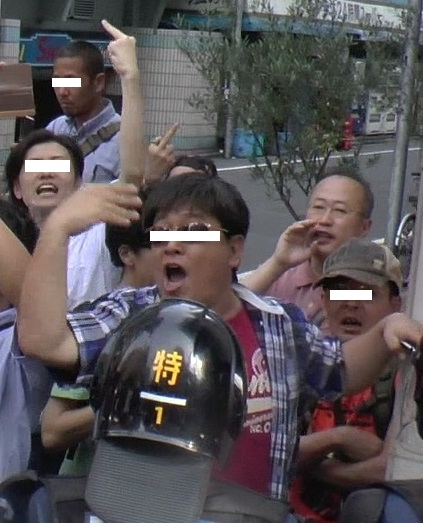
Anti-Zaitokukai group. Behind to the right is noted anti-racist activist Yoshifu Arita.

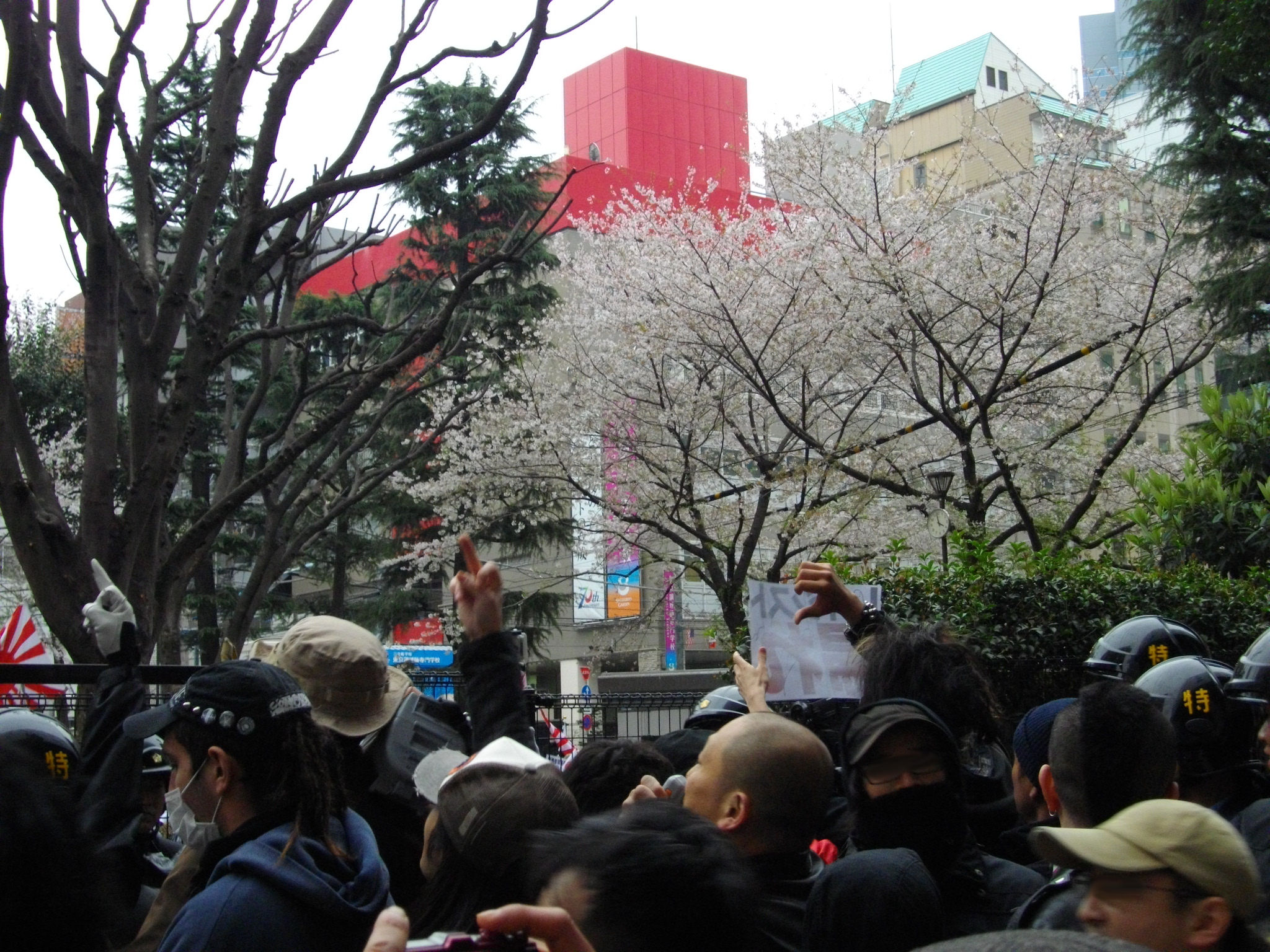
Anti-Zaitokukai rally in Tokyo, 2013

The group has been compared to neo-Nazis although sociologists quoted by The New York Times in 2010 stated "they lack an aggressive ideology of racial supremacy. There have been no reports of injuries, or violence beyond pushing and shouting."

The group is criticized for its aggressive and racist behaviour towards non-citizen residents of Japan, mostly Zainichi Koreans. Its supporters have described Zainichi Koreans as "criminals" and "cockroaches", and called upon them to be killed.

It frequently organizes small-scale public demonstrations against Zainichi Koreans and other social and political issues, and its members make racist insults against Koreans, Chinese, and other foreign nationals in these demonstrations. A writer for Vice News pointed out they tend to focus on Zainichi Koreans to the exclusion of other groups that might violate immigration statutes.

They also take to the Internet, and in August 2014, Lee Sin (variously named as Lee Shinhae and Lee Shin-hye), a Zainichi Korean freelance writer, filed two lawsuits, one for damages of ¥5.5 million against the group and Sakurai and ¥22 million against the administrator of Hoshu Shimpo, a conservative news website compiler for defamation by hate speech, the first of its kind. Lee received sometimes hundreds of negative messages daily on her social networking site and says that she would like to hold responsible the website compiler that profits from compiling discriminatory internet commentary.

Ikuo Gonoi, a professor at Takachiho University and researcher at the Institute of Social Science at International Christian University, described them in 2013 as "just an archaic type of 'mob' (which Hannah Arendt defined in The Origins of Totalitarianism, 1951), not something like a 'new wave'".

== Incidents ==
In 2009 they showed up at the school and home of a Filipino girl whose parents were deported for overstaying their visas. In 2010 they protested showings of The Cove.

On December 4, 2009, four members of Zaitokukai were arrested for harassing Korean students in Minami Ward, Kyoto, at a pro-DPRK school.

On June 17, 2013, Makoto Sakurai and three other members were arrested in Shinjuku, Tokyo, when a fistfight broke out between counter-protesters and the Zaitokukai.

In early 2014, their demonstration of 100 in Ikebukuro were met by double the number of counterprotesters. Sakurai's van was surrounded but managed to escape to Koreatown, and one member and four counterprotesters were arrested.

== See also ==
- Uyoku dantai
- Chongryon
- Japan First Party
- Ethnic issues in Japan
- Ku Klux Klan
- Movement Against Illegal Immigration
- Japanese information operations and information warfare
- Magyar Gárda
