= List of koryū schools of martial arts =

This is an incomplete list of koryū (lit. "traditional schools", or "old schools") martial arts. These are schools of martial arts that originated in Japan, and were founded prior to 1876, when the act prohibiting the wearing of swords (Haitōrei) came into effect after the Meiji Restoration.

== Alphabetical listing ==
=== Comprehensive systems ===
- Asayama Ichiden-ryū
- Kashima Shin-ryū
- Kukishin-ryū
- Sekiguchi Shinshin-ryū
- Suiō-ryū
- Takeda Ryu Nakamura Ha
- Tatsumi-ryū
- Tenshin Shōden Katori Shintō-ryū
- Tenshinshō Jigen-ryū
- Takenouchi-ryū
- Tendō-ryū
- Yagyū Shingan-ryū

=== Grappling/close-quarters ryū (armoured, unarmoured) ===
- Daitō-ryū Aiki-jūjutsu
- Hontai Yōshin-ryū
- Kitō-ryū
- Kukishin-ryū
- Sekiguchi-ryū
- Shindō Yōshin-ryū
- Sosuishi-ryū
- Tenjin Shin'yō-ryū
- Yagyū Shingan-ryū
- Yōshin-ryū - Founded by Akiyama Yoshitoki
- Yōshin-ryū (Yōshin Koryū) - Founded by Miura Yōshin

=== Sword-drawing ryū (battōjutsu, iaijutsu, etc.) ===
- Hoki-ryū
- Musō Jikiden Eishin-ryū
- Sekiguchi-ryu
- Tamiya-ryū (Kuroda)
- Tamiya-ryū (Tsumaki)
- Yagyū Shinkage-ryū

=== Sword-fighting ryū (kenjutsu, tōjutsu) ===
- Hyōhō Niten Ichi-ryū
- Ittō-ryū
  - Hokushin Ittō-ryū
  - Ittō Shoden Muto-ryū
  - Kogen Ittō-ryū
  - Mizoguchi-ha Ittō-ryū
  - Nakanishi Ittō-ryū
  - Ono-ha Ittō-ryū
- Jigen-ryū
- Kage-ryū
- Kage-ryū (Aizu)
- Kashima Shinden Jikishinkage-ryū
- Kashima Shintō-ryū
- Maniwa Nen-ryū
- Mugai-ryū
- Nen-ryū
- Tennen Rishin-ryū
- Tenshin Shōden Katori Shintō-ryū
- Shingyotō-ryū
- Shinkage-ryū
- Yagyū Shinkage-ryū
- Yoshioka-ryū

=== Spear/polearm-fighting ryū (sōjutsu, naginatajutsu) ===
- Higo Ko-ryū
- Hōzōin-ryū
- Jikishinkage-ryū Naginatajutsu
- Toda ha Buko-ryū
- Yōshin-ryū (not to be confused with Hontai Yōshin-ryū)
- Tenshin Bukō-ryū Heihō

=== Stick/Staff ryū (jōjutsu, bōjutsu) ===
- Shintō Musō-ryū

=== Blade throwing ryū (shuriken-jutsu) ===
- Negishi Ryu

=== Various weaponry ===
- Isshin-ryū (kusarigamajutsu; not to be confused with Isshin-ryū karate)
