= List of Japanese martial arts =

The following is a list of styles or schools in Japanese martial arts. For historical (koryū) schools, see List of koryū schools of martial arts.

- Aikido
- Araki-ryū
- Ashihara kaikan
- Bajutsu
- Battōjutsu
- Bōjutsu
- Bujinkan
- Byakuren Kaikan
- Chitō-ryū
- Daitō-ryū Aiki-jūjutsu
- Enshin kaikan
- Gensei-ryū
- Gōjū-ryū
- Hakkō-ryū
- Hojōjutsu
- Hōjutsu
- Iaido
- Isshin-ryu
- Jōdō
- Japanese kickboxing
- Judo
- Jūkendō
- Jujutsu
- Juttejutsu
- Karate
- Kendo
- Kenjutsu
- Kenpo
- Kosho Shorei Ryu Kempo
- Kūdō
- Kusarigamajutsu
- Kyokushin
- Kyūdō
- Kyūjutsu
- Naginatajutsu
- Maniwa Nen-ryū
- Ninjutsu
- Nippon Kempo
- Niten Ichi-ryū
- Okinawan kobudō
- Shindō jinen-ryū
- Shitō-ryū
- Shoot Boxing
- Shoot wrestling
- Shootfighting
- Shōrin-ryū
- Shorinji Kempo
- Shorinji-Ryu
- Shōtōkan-ryū
- Shūdōkan
- Shūkōkai
- Shurikenjutsu
- Sōjutsu
- Sōsuishi-ryū
- Suijutsu
- Sumo
- Taido
- Taijutsu
- Takeda Ryu Nakamura Ha
- Takenouchi-ryū
- Tantojutsu
- Tegumi
- Tenshin Shōden Katori Shintō-ryū
- Tenshinsho Jigen Ryu
- Tessenjutsu
- Togakure-ryu
- Tōon-ryū
- Toyama-ryū
- Uechi-ryū
- Wado-ryū
- Yabusame
- Yagyū Shingan-ryū
- Yoseikan Budo
- Yoseikan Karate
- Yoshukai Karate

== See also ==
- Comparison of karate styles
- Comparison of kobudō styles
