= Isshin-ryū kusarigamajutsu =

Isshin-ryū (一心流)
- Ko-ryū
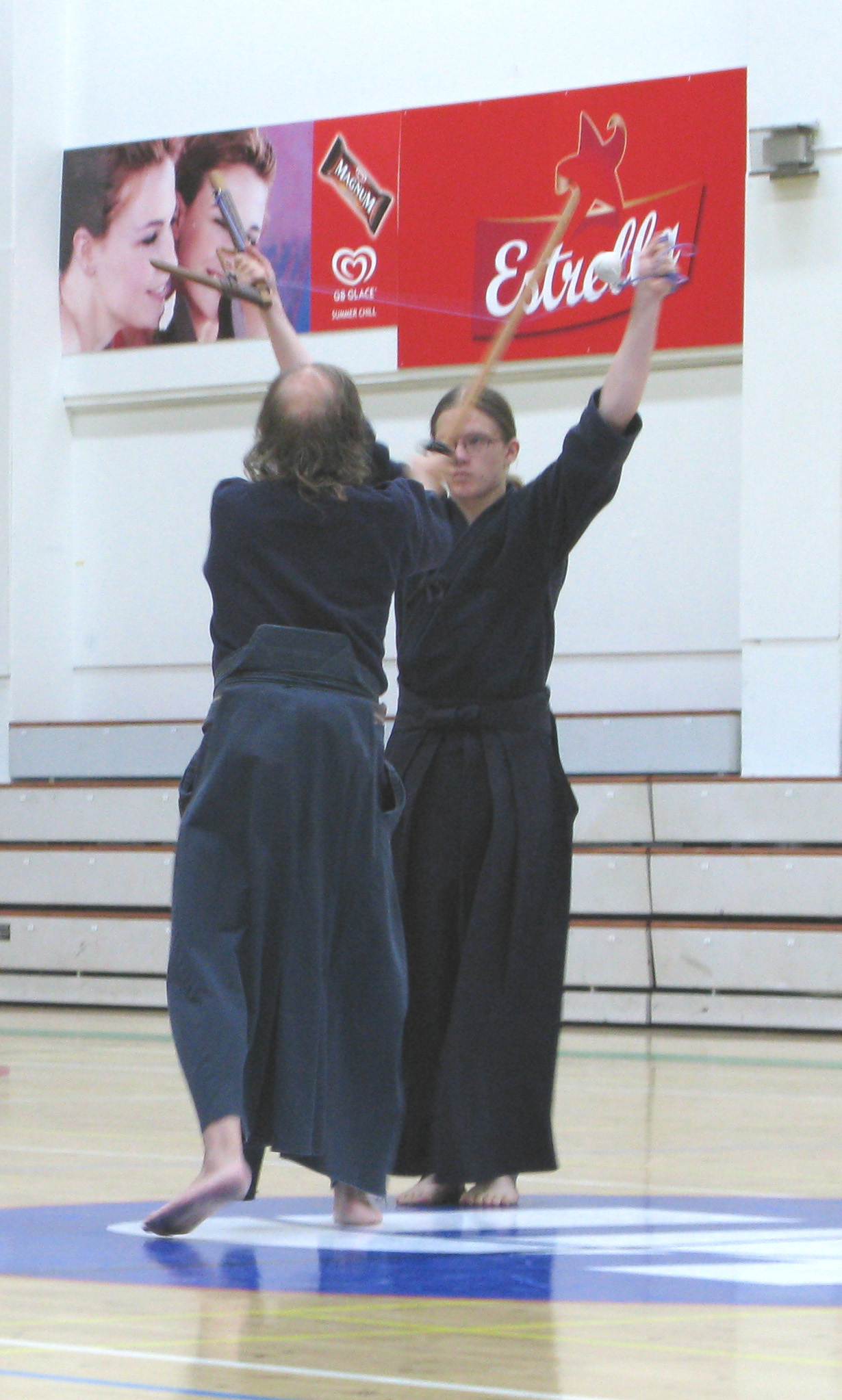
- Mitokorodzume (三所詰)

Foundation
- Founder: Tan Isshin
- Date founded: c. 17th century
- Period founded: Early Edo period

Current information
- Current headmaster: No single headmaster

Arts taught
- Art: Description
- Kusarigamajutsu: Chain and scythe art

Ancestor schools
- Maniwa Nen-ryū

Descendant schools
- N/A

Isshin-ryū (一心流) is a traditional school of the Japanese martial art of kusarigamajutsu, the art of using the chain and scythe (kusarigama). Its exact origin is disputed, and may have been founded as early as the 14th century by the samurai Nen Ami Jion 念阿弥慈恩 (b.1351-?), but the modern-day techniques were compiled and incorporated no later than the 17th century, by the unification (tan'isshin, 丹一心) of Harayuki Uemon Ujisada (原志右衛門氏貞), hence the name. It is preserved in Shintō Musō-ryū as a "heiden" (subsumed teaching).

== History ==
The methods that were originally taught in this ryuha included bōjutsu, hobaku (a.k.a. hojojutsu or torinawa), torite, kusarigama and shuriken.

Some scholars date the origin to Harayuki Uemon Ujisada who compiled the techniques. Yet, his lineage harkens back to a priest who lived in the early 15th century, named Nen Ami Jion, as the ryuso (founder). In any case the ryuha eventually fragmented as the bōjutsu tradition was discovered to be practiced in Kyoto; the torite is recorded in Numata-han and Yoshida-han and still another branch was recorded as practicing the bōjutsu (as well as naginata) in Yonezawa-han. The Kusarigama is perhaps the best known fragment of the ryuha.

== The kusarigama ==
The original inspiration for the kusarigama is the ordinary scythe (kama) which was used by peasants to harvest crops and by infantrymen to clear out vegetation when on campaign. The Isshin-ryu tradition dictates that the claimed founder of Isshin-ryu, Nen Ami Jion, created the IR-kusarigama after receiving a vision of a divine being holding a scythe(kama) in one hand and a metal weight in the other.

Among the various kusarigama-designs of other traditions the kusarigama found in Isshin-ryu is of a rather uncommon design. IS-kusarigama traits are the longer chain and straight, double-edged blade, with several other traditions preferring a curved single-edged blade and a much shorter chain. Early documents describing the weapon state that the blade is around 30 cm (12 in), with a chain length of 3.6 m (12 ft). The "kama" or blade is straight for the most part, and has a double edge with an attached metal handguard. The handle is made of hardwood and is approximately 36 cm (14 in) in length.

== Kusarigama methods ==
The kusarigama's role as a battlefield weapon was limited, as it required an open area in which to swing the chain and weight. The ability to use the chain effectively was slim on a crowded battlefield and even tall grass and tree-branches could prevent the chain from being swung properly. The kusarigama found its main usage in peace-time for law-enforcement or duels in less hindering environments.

As a practical weapon, the scythe-part of the IR-kusarigama is used to strike, slash or thrust at various parts of an opponent's body, including neck, hands, wrists and solar plexus. The scythe is also used to catch an opponent's sword between the blade and the handguard. A strength of the IR-kusarigama is that it can be wielded in the normal manner, with the scythe up, or it can be used upside down. The handle itself, being made of hardwood, is used to strike, thrust, block and parry. The chain can be swung as a flail and used to ensnare the opponent's sword, limbs or even the body itself making it difficult for the swordsman to maneuver or using his weapon effectively. In some forms (kata) the weight is deployed to strike the opponent's body, including the head, back and hands.

== Training ==
The kusarigama is for the most part taught only to advanced students who have achieved a high level of proficiency in the Shinto Muso-ryu Jodo forms, though the level required is not standardized and different Jodo-organizations have different requirements. Modern Isshin-ryu exponents use a wooden version of the kusarigama for safety-reasons. The handguard (goken) is still made of metal but the chain and weight replaced by rope and a leather bag. A kusarigama with a metal (though non-sharp) blade is sometimes used for demonstrations.

== Isshin-ryu kusarigama forms ==
In the Isshin-ryu system of modern times there a total of 30 training-forms (kata) divided into three series, Omote, Kage and Oku. The forms of the Omote and Kage-series share the same name but are different in application.

Omote (表) and Kage (影) series

1. Ishiki (居敷)
2. Soemi (添身)
3. Hagaeshi (羽返)
4. Mugan (無眼)
5. Jûmonji (十文字)
6. Furikomi ichimonji (振込 一文字)
7. Furikomi jumonji (振込 十文字)
8. Iso no nami (磯之浪)
9. Makiotoshi (巻落)
10. Mitokorodzume (三所詰)
11. Ukifune (浮船)
12. Sodegarami (袖搦)

Oku (奥) series

1. Mae (前)
2. Ushiro (後)
3. Hidari (左)
4. Migi (右)
5. Yariai zen (槍合 前)
6. Yariai go (槍合 後)

== Acronyms ==
- IR= Isshin-ryu
- SMR= Shintō Musō-ryū
