= Kobudō =

Collective term for traditional Japanese martial arts

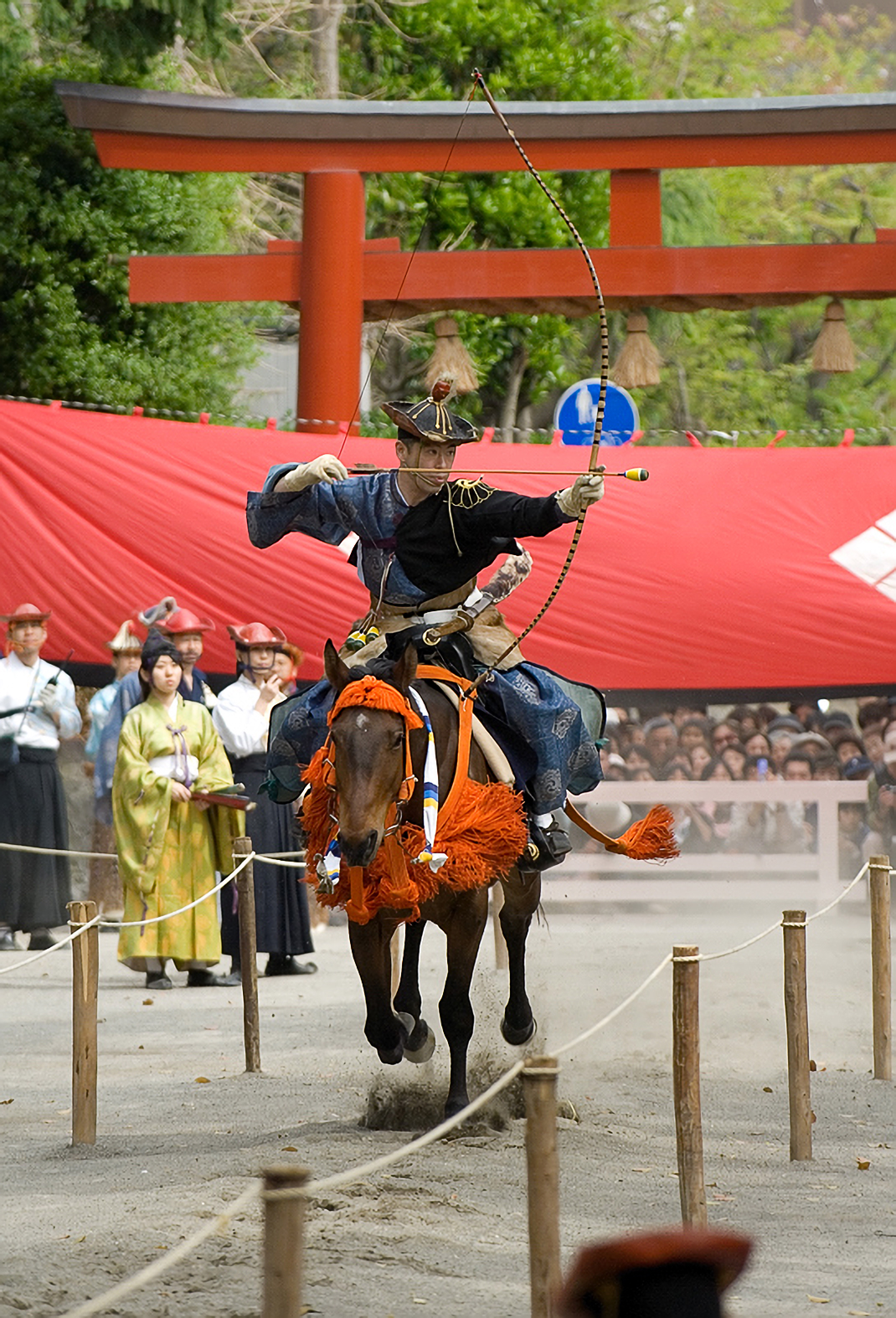
Yabusame archer on horseback, an ancient combat form

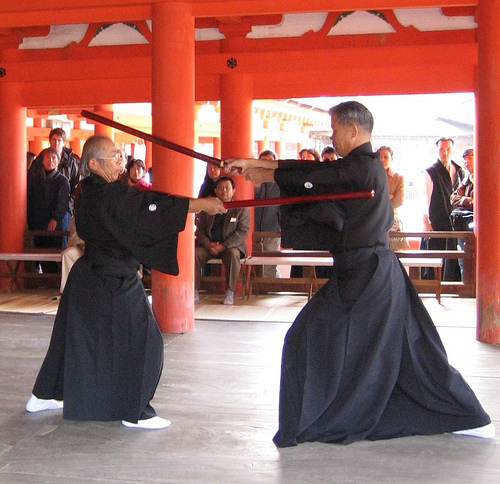
Yagyū Shinkage-ryū, one of the oldest schools of swordsmanship (kenjutsu)

Kobudō (古武道; 'old martial arts') is a collective term for Japanese traditional techniques for the use of armour, blades, firearms, and techniques related to combat and horse riding. The kanji Ko-ryū Bujutsu (古流武術; 'old-school martial arts') and Kobujutsu (古武術; 'old martial arts') are other ways of writing it. The general umbrella term ko-ryū (古流; 'old school') is also used to describe these ancient arts.

== Definition and features ==
Kobudō (古武道) can be translated as 古 (old) 武 (martial) 道 (way) "old martial art"; the term appeared in the first half of the seventeenth century. Kobudō marks the beginning of the Tokugawa period (1603–1868) also called the Edo period, when total power was consolidated by the ruling Tokugawa clan. The term often refers to martial arts established before the Meiji Restoration of the 19th century. Since the Muromachi period, swordsmanship, jūjutsu, martial arts, archery, artillery, etc. have been technicalized and systematized as various schools. The term Kobudō (古武道, ancient martial arts) contrasts with Gendai budō ("modern martial arts") or shinbudō ("new martial arts") which refer to schools developed since the Meiji era.

Whereas modern martial arts are designed to develop humanistic ideals through physical and mental training, focusing on sports-related competitions and constructing technical systems (e.g., jūdō and kendō) that encourage team work, socially healthy values, and prosperity, the old historical martial arts intention was not fundamentally concerned with an outcome of winning a match as a sports match. Training was for the sake of it and was often about life or death. Dangerous techniques that are excluded from modern martial arts include various hidden weapons, medicinal and poisoning methods, and magic. Old martial arts are linked to Zen and Buddhism. They may also include irrational movements whose original meaning have been lost even to those who are masters of the school, or movements added for aesthetic reasons during the peaceful Edo period.

The system of kobudō is considered in the following priorities order: 1) morals, 2) discipline 3) aesthetic form.

== Okinawan kobudō ==
Kobudō can also be used to refer to Okinawan kobudō where it describes collectively all Okinawan combative systems. These are entirely different and basically unrelated systems. The use of the term kobudō should not be limited, as it popularly is, to the describing of the ancient weapons systems of Okinawa.

== Examples of taught skills ==
- Bōjutsu
- Jujutsu
- Jittejutsu
- Kenjutsu
- Kyūjutsu
- Naginatajutsu
- Ōzutsu (大筒) hand cannon
- Sōjutsu
- Tantojutsu
- Yabusame

== See also ==
- List of koryū schools of martial arts

== Sources ==
- Draeger, Donn F. Classical Bujitsu (Martial Arts and Ways of Japan). Weatherhill, 1973, 2007. ISBN 978-0834802339
- Hall, David A. Encyclopedia of Japanese Martial Arts. Kodansha USA, 2012. ISBN 978-1568364100
- Skoss, Diane, Editor. Koryu Bujutsu: Classical Warrior Traditions of Japan. Koryubooks, 1997. ISBN 978-1890536046
- Skoss, Diane, Editor. Sword and Spirit: Classical Warrior Traditions of Japan, Volume 2. Koryubooks, 1999. ISBN 978-1890536053
- Skoss, Diane, Editor. Keiko Shokon: Classical Warrior Traditions of Japan, Volume 3. Koryubooks, 2002. ISBN 978-1890536060
