= Go no sen =

Karate technique

Japanese name
- Kanji: 後の先
- Hiragana: ご の せん

Go no sen (Japanese: 後の先, post-initiative) is a concept in Japanese martial arts in which a combatant takes the initiative in a fight after the opponent has already started an attack. In other words, once the opponent starts to attack, the defending combatant performs this technique. The go no sen technique can take various forms, since it depends on the use of the energy and momentum of the attacker.

This is not just counter-attack. Go no sen is a mental state, a level of concentration assumed during combat. It is more correct to say that it is a harmonization with the very movement of attack, not just defense. Go no sen is developed through repetitive training, with only one focus, to attack and defend at the same time achieving the most efficient results to end a confrontation.

One of the methods to grab ki (気, energy) so that it can be manipulated, is to wait for the opponent's move. Once it has been made, the defender takes the strength used by the attacker, incapacitating it, their weapon of use and intention. Go no sen extinguishes all combative possibilities from flowing within that moment, ending the confrontation with its own ki. For this, it is necessary to capture the move at the right moment. There must be harmony between the two fighters, but only one needs to mentally and emotionally embrace it, to extinguish the ki of the other. If the opponent is simply opposed, there will be only shock and loss of strength for both. If there is harmony, this loss will be limited to the attacker.

Besides the martial aspect, go no sen can be seen as part of a philosophical and moral code, emphasized when one considers the term "dō" (道), meaning that the budōka (武道家, follower of budō) should never take the initiative in an eventual and inevitable confrontation. In karate, this is seen in the saying "in karate there is no first strike" (空手に先手なし, karate ni sente nashi).
