= Tendō-ryū =

School of traditional Japanese martial arts

Tendō-ryū (天道流)
- Ko-ryū

Foundation
- Founder: Saito Hangan Denkibo Katsuhide
- Date founded: November 21, 1582
- Period founded: Late Muromachi period

Current information
- Current headmaster: Kimura Yasuko

Arts taught
- Art: Description
- Naginatajutsu: Glaive art
- Kenjutsu - tachi, kodachi, nitō, tantō, kaiken: Sword art - long sword, short sword, two swords, dagger
- Jōjutsu: Short staff art, used to simulate a broken naginata
- Kusarigamajutsu: Chain and sickle art

Ancestor schools
- Kashima Shintō-ryū

Descendant schools
- None identified

Tendō-ryū (天道流), also known as Tendō-ryū naginatajutsu (天道流長刀術), is a koryū (school of traditional Japanese martial arts) founded in 1582 by Saito Hangan Denkibo Katsuhide. The current headmaster (as of 2020) is the 17th sōke Kimura Yasuko.

Although Denkibo was already an incredibly talented Samurai, he felt that his technique was still incomplete and went to the Tsurugaoka Hachiman Shrine in Kamakura to pray for 100 days. In 1581, Denkibo had the revelation he had been longing for and created his school named Ten Ryū (天流), the “School of Heaven”, which later became Tendō Ryū (天道流), the “School of the Way to Heaven”.

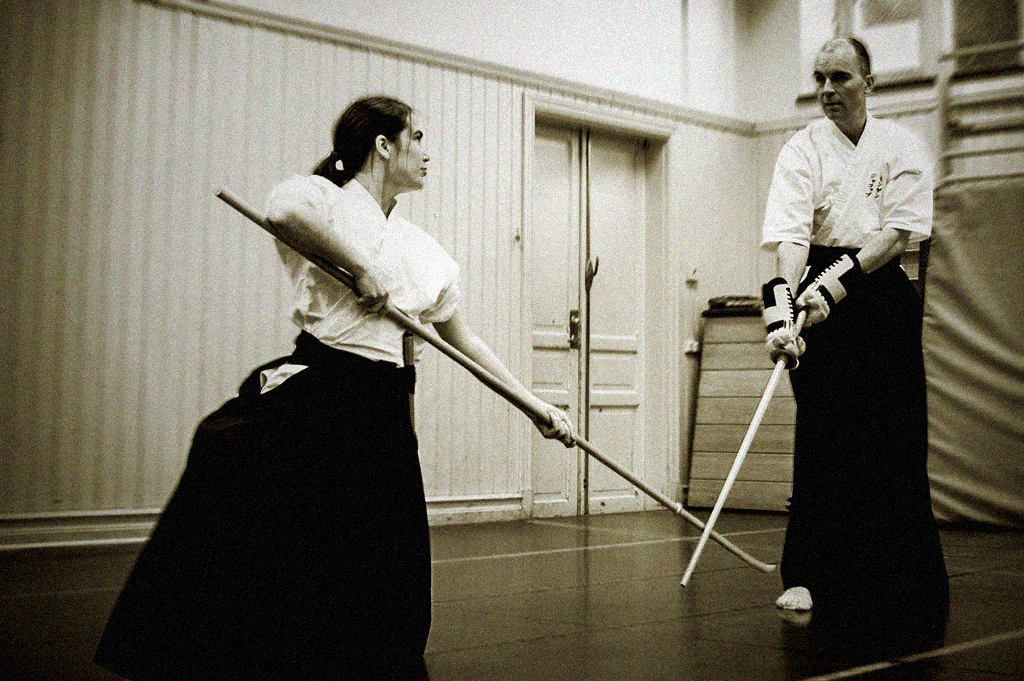
Tendō-ryū naginatajutsu

Although it is mainly known today for its techniques with the naginata, the Japanese glaive, Tendō-ryū actually includes the practice of various other weapons: the long and short swords, both swords simultaneously, two kinds of daggers, the staff (representing the shaft of a broken naginata), and the Japanese sickle-and-chain (kusarigama).

The modern version of naginata practice, called "new Naginata" (新しいなぎなた atarashii naginata), is one of the nine official modern budō recognized by the Nippon Budōkan. Tendō-ryū is one of the two main classical styles of naginatajutsu which atarashii naginata is derived from, the other one being Jikishinkage-ryu Naginatajutsu.
