= Jikishinkage-ryu Naginatajutsu =

Jikishinkage-ryū Naginatajutsu (直心影流薙刀術)
- Ko-ryū

Foundation
- Founder: Matsumoto Bizen no Kami (松本備前守)
- Date founded: c. 1570
- Period founded: Late Muromachi period

Current information
- Current headmaster: Taniguchi Katsumi (谷口 克美)

Arts taught
- Art: Description
- Naginatajutsu: Glaive art
- Tantō: Dagger art

Ancestor schools
- Kashima Shinden Jikishinkage-ryū

Descendant schools
- None identified

Jikishinkage-ryū naginatajutsu (直心影流薙刀術) is a naginatajutsu koryū which claims to have descended from Kashima Shinden Jikishinkage-ryū. Despite this claim, Jikishinkage-ryū naginatajutsu does not appear to have any of the original rituals, esoteric teachings, body and weapon movements of Kashima Shinden Jikishinkage-ryū.

Sometime during the 1860s, Satake Kanryūsai (佐竹鑑柳斎) and his wife, Satake Shigeo (佐竹茂雄) developed a new naginata style which eventually came to be known as Jikishinkage-ryū naginatajutsu. In the Bugei Ryūha Daijiten (武芸流派大事典), the name of this school is also rendered as Jikishin-ryū-kage-ryū (直心柳影流) .

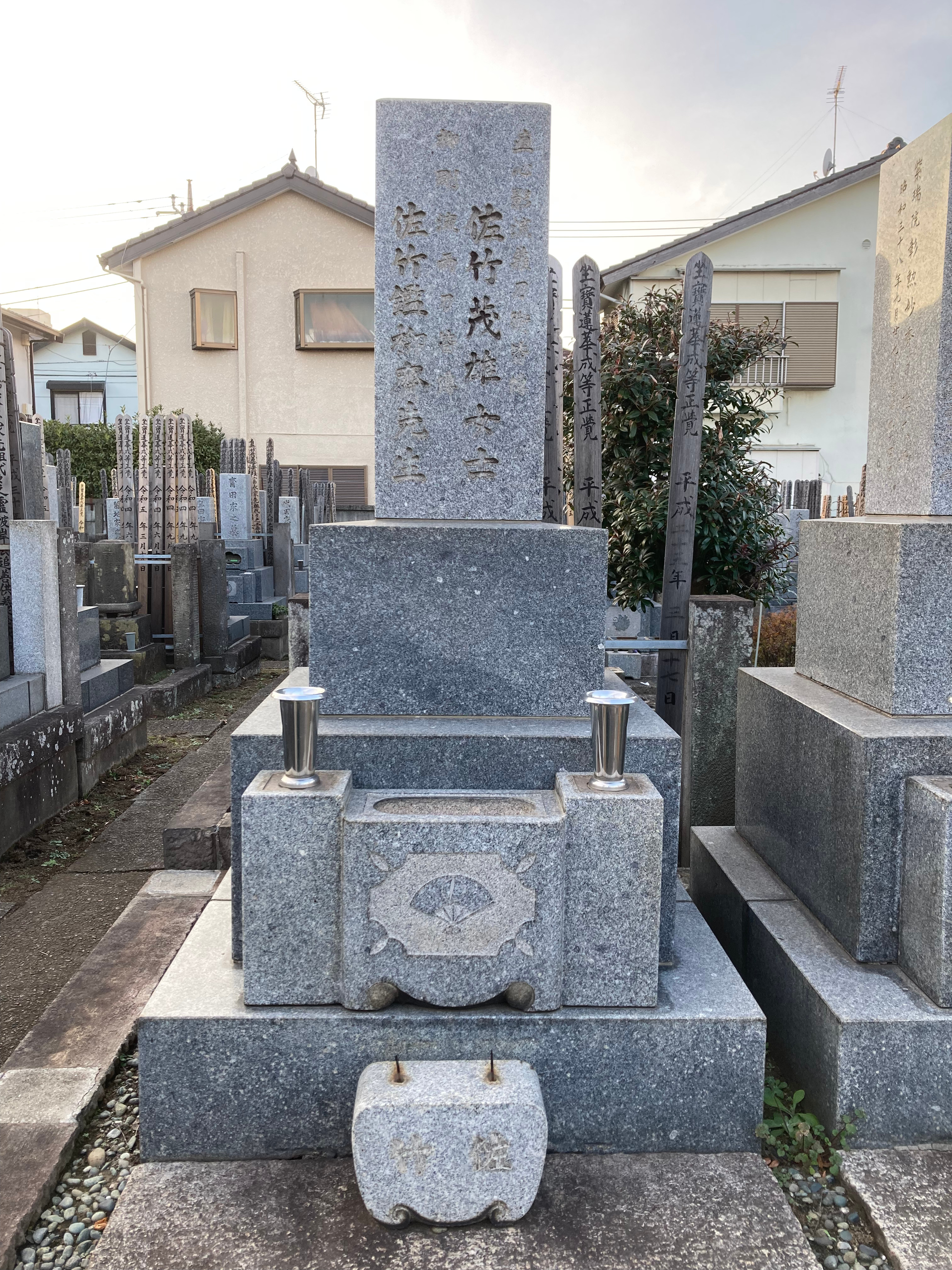
Graves of Satake Kanryūsai (佐竹鑑柳斎) and Satake Shigeo (佐竹茂雄), 14th generation headmasters of Jikishinkageryū naginatajutsu, Sōgenji temple, Suginami, Tokyo, Japan. The gravestone states that Satake Kanryūsai was ranked as Ryūgōryū ryōtō kaiden (柳剛流両刀皆傳) and Satake Shigeo was ranked as Jikishinkageryū naginatajutsu kaiden (直心影流薙刀術皆傳).

It is usually claimed that Satake Kanryūsai was an exponent of Kashima Shinden Jikishinkage-ryū (鹿島神傳直心影流) and Yanagikage-ryū (柳影流). However it is believed by some that Ryūgō-ryū (柳剛流) was instead the main influence of Jikishinkage-ryū naginatajutsu, as Ryūgō-ryū was famous for using very long shinai (120 - 183 cm in length) as well as attacks to the lower legs, a technique which Jikishinkage-ryū naginatajutsu itself became famous for. Additionally, the way the naginata is held in Jikishinkage-ryū naginatajutsu appears to resemble that of a sword rather than a heavy pole weapon.

The school's main curriculum consists of twenty-five naginata kata and ten tantō kata. In addition, there are five secret naginata gokui-waza (極意技) and four kata forming the reiken-shihō-kiri (霊剣四方切). Ten kusarigama kata from Chokuyūshin-ryū (直猶心流) are also transmitted together with the naginata kata.

Jikishinkage-ryū naginatajutsu and Tendō-ryū are the two main classical schools of naginatajutsu which the modern practice atarashii naginata is mainly derived from.
