= Maniwa Nen-ryū =

School of Japanese martial arts

Maniwa Nen-ryū (馬庭念流)
- Ko-ryū

Foundation
- Founder: Higuchi Matashichirō
- Date founded: 1591
- Period founded: Azuchi-Momoyama period (1568–1603)

Current information
- Current headmaster: Higuchi Sadahito

Arts taught
- Art: Description
- Kenjutsu - ōdachi: Sword art - long sword
- Naginatajutsu: Glaive art
- Sōjutsu: Spear art
- Yadomejutsu: Arrow deflection art

Ancestor schools
- Nen-ryū

Descendant schools
- Honma Nen Ryu

Maniwa Nen-ryū (馬庭念流) is a traditional school (koryū) of Japanese martial arts founded in 1591 by Higuchi Matashichirō Sadatsugu (c. 16th century). Matashichirō was a student of Nen-ryū (a style taught by Jion Nennami), and founded Maniwa Nen-ryū after receiving inka (stamp or seal) from Akamatsu Gion. It is currently headed by the 25th headmaster, Higuchi Sadahito.

Maniwa Nen-ryū is significant in that it is one of the oldest surviving Japanese battlefield traditions today and is unusual in that throughout its history it has been promoted and preserved by the members of a particular village.

Said to have been brought to Maniwa by Higuchi Kaneshige in 1494, during its history this sword style earned a reputation for creating strong exponents as many engaged in bouts against members of other noted sword schools.

The style is characterized by its use of fukuro shinai, or mock bamboo swords, quilted gloves and headgear to engage in what it calls kiriwara jiai, which are competitions in which exponents can test their skills without suffering serious injury. It is not historically verified when this tradition became an intrinsic part of this school's training but along with the Shinkage and Yagyū Shinkage schools it was of the first schools of Japanese bujutsu to have employed the use of the bamboo training weapon. This training device was further developed by Nakanishi Chuto of the Nakanishi-ha Ittō-ryū and later became an important element in the establishing of the modern sport of kendo.

In execution, the techniques of this school sometimes appear to be awkward and lacking the stylistic polish which characterize other schools of classical Japanese sword. However the Maniwa Nen-ryū system is said to be deceptively subtle in its technique and has proved its effectiveness in both battlefield and duels throughout its long history.

== References and further reading ==
- Draeger, Donn (1973. Classical Budo. The Martial Arts and Ways of Japan, 2. New York & Tokyo: Weatherhill.
- Skoss, Diane, ed. (1997). Koryu Bujutsu. Classical Warrior Traditions of Japan, Volume 1. New Jersey, Koryu Books.
- Skoss, Diane, ed. (2002). Keiko Shokon. Classical Warrior Traditions of Japan, Volume 3. Koryu Books. ISBN 1-890536-06-7.
