= Naginatajutsu =

Japanese martial art using the naginata

Naginatajutsu (長刀術、 薙刀術)
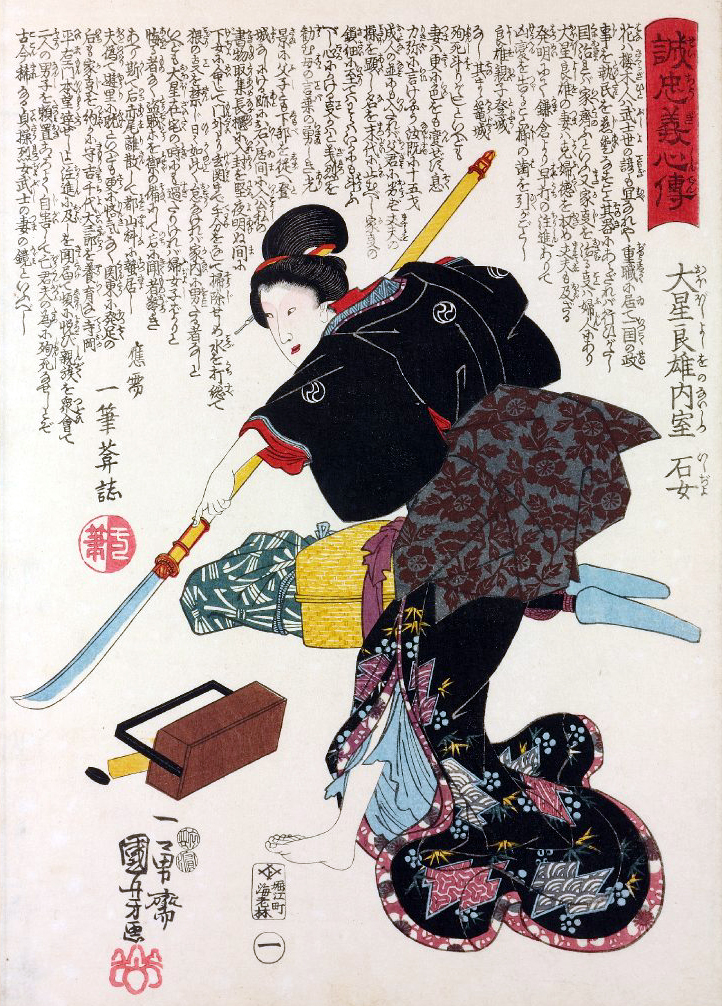
- In later Japanese history, the naginata was associated with female samurai.
- Focus: Weaponry (Naginata)
- Country of origin: Japan
- Olympic sport: No

Naginatajutsu (長刀術 or 薙刀術) is the Japanese martial art of wielding the naginata (長刀). The naginata is a weapon resembling the European glaive and the Chinese guandao. Most naginatajutsu practiced today is in a modernized form, a gendai budō, in which competitions also are held.

== History ==
=== Origins ===
The naginata originates from development of the Japanese spear called hoko yari of the later 1st millennium AD. It has been suggested that it developed along the same lines as Okinawan kobudō weapons as a modified farming tool. Others say that creative samurai in need of a longer weapon attached a sword to a pole. Perhaps the simplest explanation is the natural development of polearms. Polearms are intended as mass weapons, to be used not just by individual warriors, but by formations of soldiers together on field battles and not for dueling. When fighting in close order, two-handed cut-and-thrust weapons, such as halberds and glaives, are much more efficient than mere spears or swords because of their versatility compared to spears and longer reach compared to swords. Fighting in massed formation does not require similar individual weapon-handling skills as required by a skilled swordsman. Naginata are almost identical in appearance to both the glaive and the guandao, and are most likely the result of parallel evolution.

=== Pre-modern Japan ===
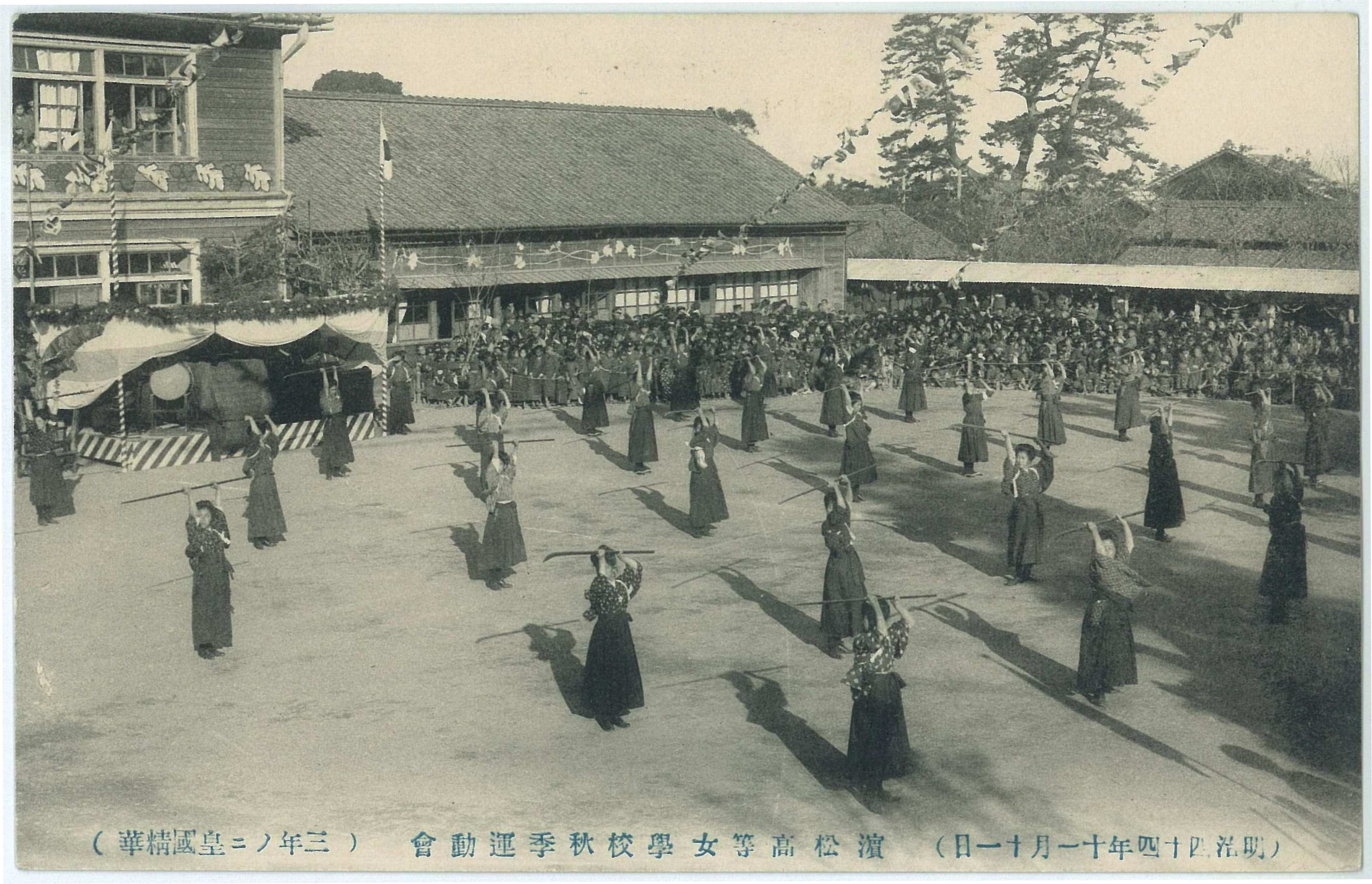
Female students perform Naginatajutsu at an autumn sports festival of Hamamatsu Municipal Senior High School in 1911

The oldest account of naginata is in the Kojiki. Naginata can be seen in use in the paintings of battlefield scenes during the Tengyō no Ran in 936 AD. The naginata was a weapon used mainly by onna-musha (女武者, warrior women), sōhei (僧兵; warrior monks), and yamabushi (山伏, mountain monks).

In the early history of its use, the naginata was primarily used against cavalry, as its length kept the wielder a safe distance from horses and their riders.

Its use became popular around the year 1000 AD. In the centuries that followed, the naginata's popularity rose and fell as tactics used in battle evolved.

The importance of naginata for samurai can be attested by the relatively large number of styles of bujutsu that have incorporated it in their curriculum, to name a few: Suiō-ryū, Tenshin Shōden Katori Shintō-ryū, Tendō-ryū, Toda-ha Bukō-ryū and Yōshin-ryū.

During the Tokugawa period (1603–1868), the naginata was transformed into a status symbol to distinguish women of samurai families, as well as being the primary means for a woman to defend her home while her husband was away in times of war. This period also saw the propagation of the naginata as a feminine art and the weapon serving as more of a symbol of devotion to a woman's family.

=== Modern Japan ===
With the end of the samurai era and the Meiji Restoration in 1868, Japan was modernized and many of the old practices fell into disuse. During the Shōwa era, Naginata became part of the physical education school curriculum for girls. The practice at this time was called naginata-dō (薙刀道; lit. "way of the naginata").

After Japan's defeat in World War II, the practice was remodeled, resulting in two naginata practices: koryū naginata (古流薙刀; "old" or classical naginata) and atarashii naginata (新しいなぎなた; "new" or modern naginata).

Despite the differences, the two ways of practicing naginata share many things in common. In both, the practice is systematized according to a tradition of strokes, cuts, and movements of the left and right in various directions, promoting training with an emphasis on the form and beauty of the movement.

== Koryū Naginata ==
Naginata is found as part of the curriculum of several styles of Kobudō. Many koryū ryūha, such as the Tenshin Shōden Katori Shintō-ryū, Suiō-ryū, Maniwa Nen-ryū, Jikishinkage-ryu Naginatajutsu, Tendō-ryū and Hokushin Ittō-ryū include naginatajutsu in their curriculum, as do arts such as Shidare Yanagi-ryū and budō organizations such as the Bujinkan. The practice and grading system varies from style to style, as well as the use or not of protectors for the practice of combat.

Some of the most common known styles that incorporate naginata in their curriculum are:

=== Tenshin Shōden Katori Shintō-ryū ===
Tenshin Shōden Katori Shintō-ryū is the oldest style of koryū, and Japan's only tradition recognized as bunkazai (文化財), or Japanese cultural treasure. The characteristics of this school are dynamic techniques and long katas, with movements such as jumps, turns with the body and ascending and descending cuts used in alternation.

Tenshin Shōden Katori Shintō-ryū has seven kata with naginata, divided into two sets.

=== Suiō-ryū ===
Suiō-ryū lai Kenpō is one of the most complete styles, with several weapons in its curriculum. The naginata occupies an important part, having been incorporated by the founder of the style, Mima Yochizaemon Kagenobu (1577–1665), who learned to use this weapon with the sōhei monks during the musha shugyō (武者修行; warrior pilgrimage) that he made in the first part of his life.

In Suiō-ryū, naginata kata are divided into three sets: naginata against sword, naginata against naginata, and solo forms in which techniques used on battlefields to slaughter horses are practiced.

=== Other traditions ===
Other important traditions that teach Naginata are:

- Tendō-ryū Naginatajutsu
- Jikishinkage-ryū Naginatajutsu
- Toda-ha Bukō-ryū Naginatajutsu
- Higo Ko-ryū Naginatajutsu
- Yōshin-ryū Naginatajutsu

== Atarashii Naginata ==
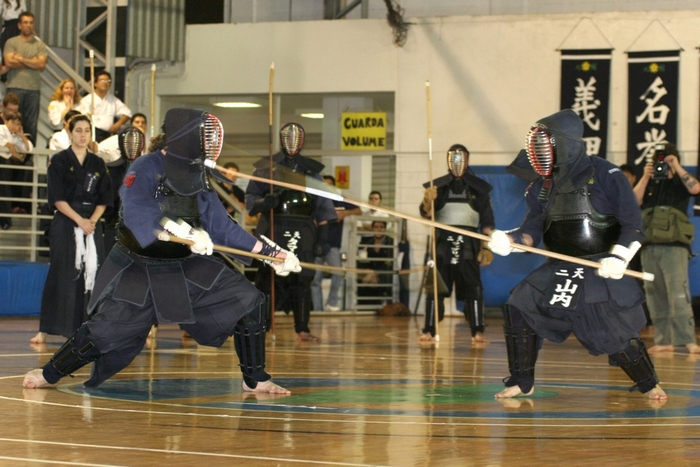
Modern competition with bamboo naginata.

Today, the naginata is most often used in the form of a sport called "new Naginata" (新しいなぎなた, atarashii naginata), or simply "Naginata," which uses kendo-style protective equipment and wood or bamboo weapons. In Japanese, Naginata, the sport, is distinguished from the naginata, the weapon, by being rendered in hiragana (なぎなた) rather than in kanji (長刀). In other languages, the name "Naginata" is usually capitalized to make the same distinction.

It is most common in Japan for Naginata to be practiced by women; in other countries, the gender balance is more even.

=== The practice ===
The first associations for the practice of Atarashii Naginata were formed in 1950, bringing together more than 15 different styles.

In 1955, the Zen Nihon Naginata Renmei – All Japan Naginata Federation (AJNF) – was established, which regulated the official style of this art, bringing together the techniques of the various existing styles, mainly Tendō-ryū and Jikishinkage-ryū.

Atarashii Naginata started to be written, in Japanese, using the hiragana characters, instead of kanji.

==== Stances ====
Different stances should be used as efficiently as possible. The official stances are:

- Shizentai
- Chudan no kamae
- Hassō no kamae
- Gedan no kamae
- Waki kamae
- Jōdan no kamae
- Mugamae

==== Feet movements ====
Different steps enable swift movements within different techniques. The five feet movements are:

- Okuriashi
- Ayumiashi
- Hirakiashi
- Tsugiashi
- Fumikaeashi

==== Cutting techniques ====
Training usually begins with happōburi, in which the different cutting angles are studied. The purpose is to learn to use the weapon along with the body in the given circular movement, with minimal effort. The five cutting techniques are:

- Jōgeburi
- Nanameburi
- Yokoburi
- Nanameburi shita kara
- Furikaeshi

==== Strikes ====
The weapon moves together with the body in circular swings. The allowed strikes and thrusts are:

- Men
- Sune
- Sokumen
- Furiage sune
- Do
- Kote
- Furikaeshi men/sune/kote
- Tsuki

==== Training in pairs ====
===== Uchikaeshi =====
The first paired drill is made up of six parts of which each contains a certain strike and a certain receiving technique.

===== Shikake Ōji =====
Paired training continues with a series of predefined fights. These eight individual drills each consists of two to three attacks and defences. The initiating side is called Shikake and the receiving side is called Ōji.

===== Zen Nihon Naginata Kata =====
The official forms (Zen Nihon Naginata Kata) are seven drills in which both practitioners use a special kata naginata, which is completely made of hard wood. This series is usually taught only after the practitioner has reached the level of nidan (弐段/二段 second dan), due to its demanding technical requirements and tactical content. It is required to reach sandan (参段/三段 third dan) and higher.

===== Kakari Geiko =====
The more advanced practitioners acts as a hikitate who is a target for the other practitioner in which correct attacks should be done in a fast tempo.

===== Gokaku Geiko =====
This is a free-form match in which both practitioners are trying to hit the defined targets with correct attacks.

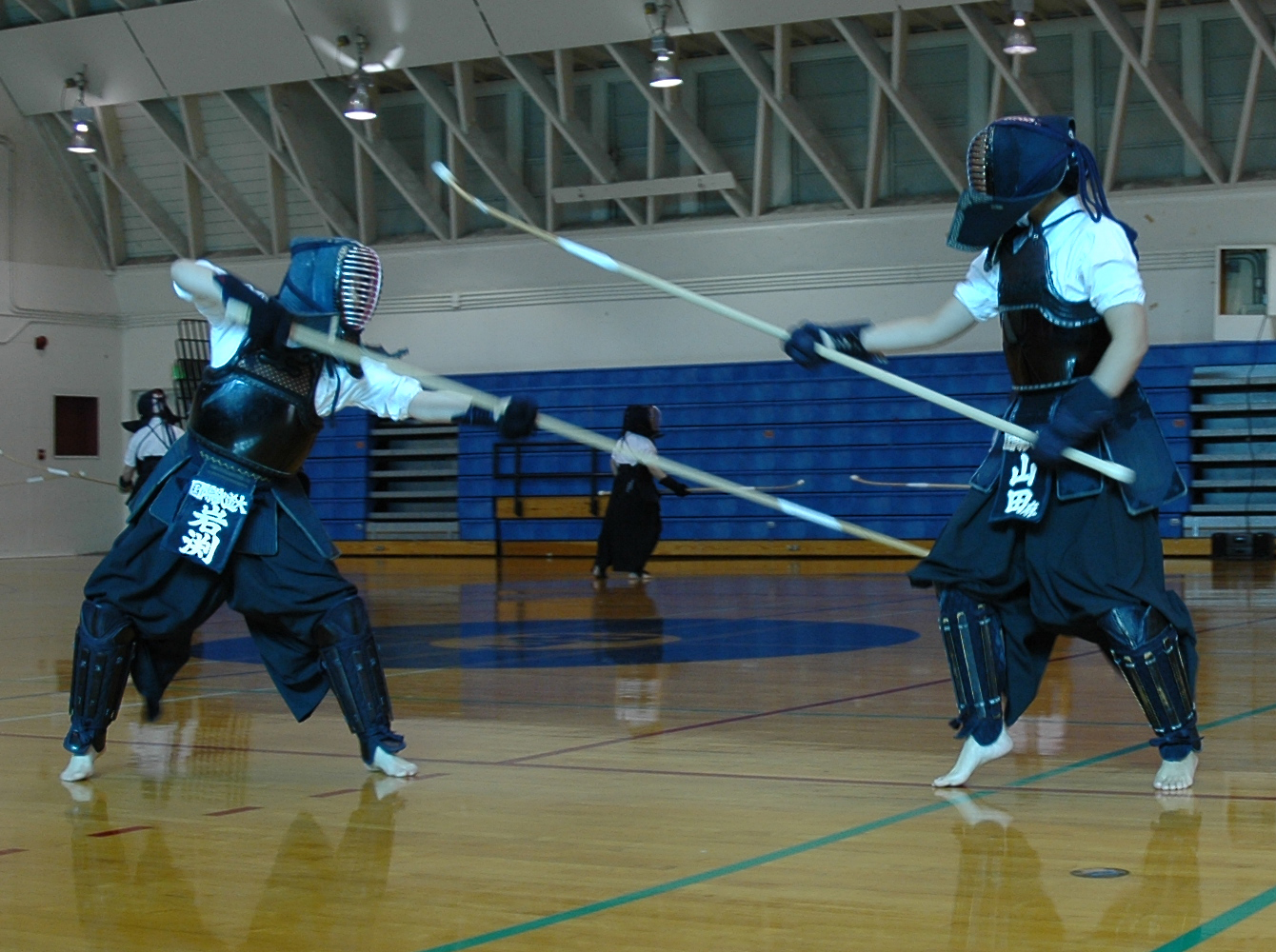
Sune - International Budo University, Japan

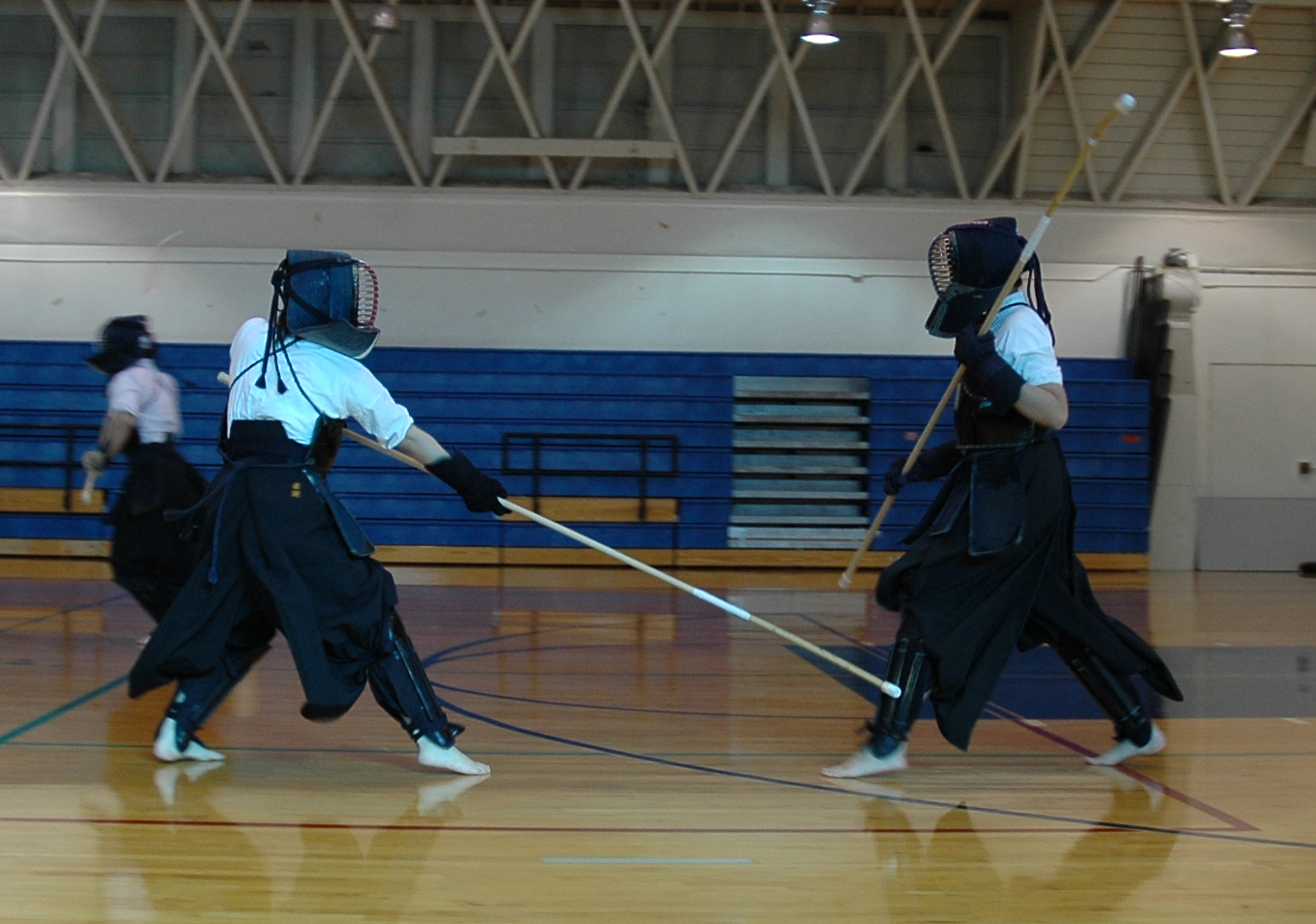
Sune - International Budo University, Japan

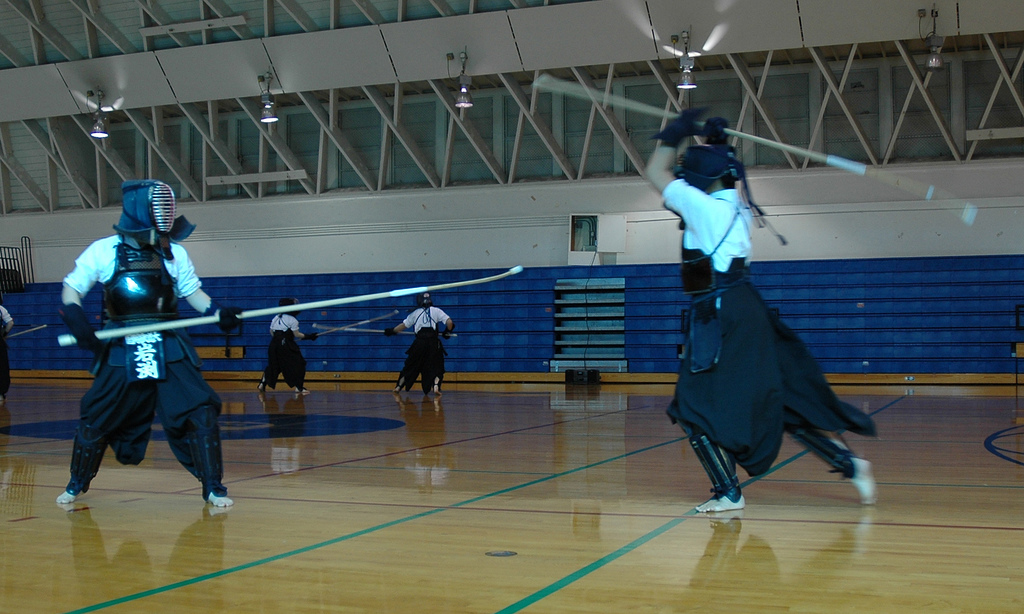
Furikaeshi - International Budo University, Japan

=== Equipment ===
The real naginata, with a steel blade and edge, is only used in demonstrations, with rare exceptions. Two types of naginata are generally used for training: the first is the shiai (sparring) naginata composed of the shaft (habu), made from solid wood for a sturdy grip, and the blade (ebu), made of very flexible bamboo strips that allow the absorption of the impact, which are then assembled and securely fastened together (sendanmaki). This is used in contact training and championships and even in the practice of basic predefined forms (Shikake Ōji); the second is made of solid wood for practicing the official forms (Zen Nihon No Kata), providing the authentic weight and balance required for formal kata performance.

Atarashi Naginata practitioners dress with protectors during contact training and championships. Traditional protective armor known as bōgu is required for sparring. They are worn in a specific order: tare (垂れ) (groin and leg guards) with a zekken (chevron) on the central section, sune-ate (脛当て) (shin guards), dō (胴) (a cuirass or torso protector), men (面) (combined face mask and shoulder protector), worn over a traditional tenugui (手拭い) (手拭い) headband), and kote (籠手) (a type of gauntlet, hand and forearm protectors). Only hits targeted at these protected points are allowed.

In comparison to Kendo, the men has shorter side flaps, the kote has articulation for the index finger, thus allowing for better handling of the weapon, and the sune-ate is not used in Kendo.

=== Philosophical aspects ===
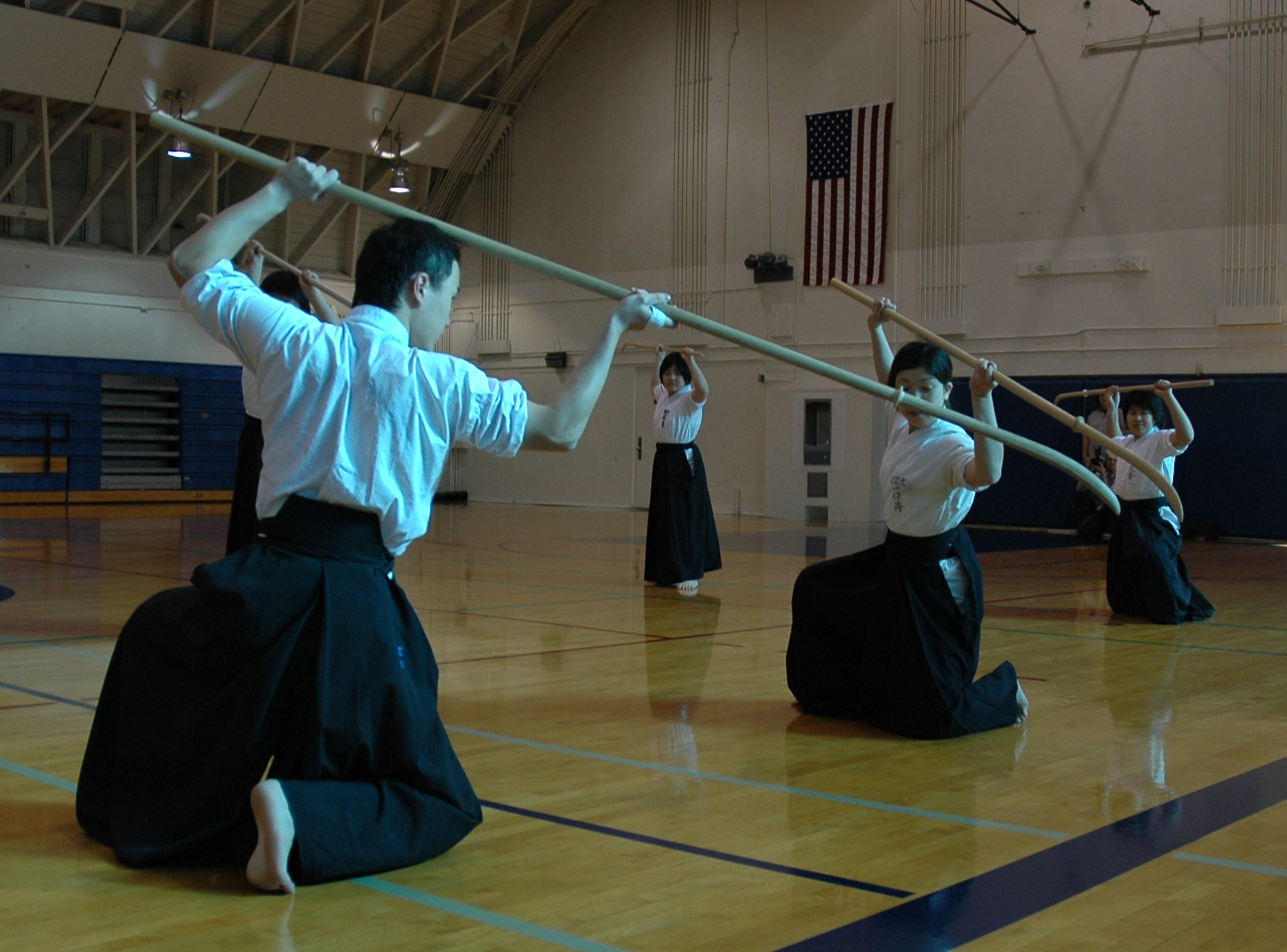
Naginata kata – International Budo University, Japan

The All Japan Naginata Federation has acted with the following concept and principle:

- Promote harmony between the mind and the body through training.

According to the All Japan Naginata Federation, through the correct guidance of Atarashii Naginata one seeks to perfect the technique, cultivate the spirit, increase vitality and also:

- Train correctly within the principles of Naginata
- Respect discipline
- Respect etiquette and cooperate with others
- Learn and preserve traditional Japanese culture
- Cultivate mind
- Develop spirit and body
- Promote peace and prosperity among people

Its key principles are: rei (礼) respect, makoto (誠) sincerity, chugi (忠義) loyalty, meiyo (名誉) honor and yuki (勇気) courage.

=== Grading system ===
The kyū (級) and dan (段) grading system is used. There are six entry-level mudansha (無段者) ranks, from the most basic, 6th kyū (rokkyū), to the most advanced, 1st kyū (ikkyū). There are five yūdansha (有段者) (dan) ranks, from the lowest, 1st dan (shodan 初段), to the highest, 5th dan (godan 五段). Instructional shōgō (称号) titles may be obtained after 5th dan: these are renshi (錬士), kyōshi (教士) and hanshi (範士).

To be eligible for the shodan exam, a candidate must have already attained ikkyū rank. To continue through the dan ranks, practitioners must wait one year from the last exam before attempting 2nd dan, two years before 3rd dan, and three years each before 4th and 5th dan.

== Naginata outside Japan ==
Atarashii Naginata currently has more than 80,000 practitioners in Japan and several countries in the West. Naginata is governed in Japan by the All Japan Naginata Federation (AJNF) (全日本なぎなた連盟). Outside Japan, the regulation of Atarashii Naginata is carried out by the International Naginata Federation (INF) (国際なぎなた連盟). The INF was created in 1990. It is divided into four sections: Japan, North and South America, Europe and Oceania. The members of the INF are Japan (1990), Belgium (1990), France (1990), Netherlands (1990), Sweden (1990), New Zealand (1990), United States (1990), Brazil (1993), Australia (1999), Czech Republic (1999), Canada (2007), Germany (2007) and Italy (2009).

=== Argentina ===
The first record of Naginata in Argentina was in 2010 by Ishiide Hiroyoshi sensei, who at that time was working in the city of Santa Fe. Regular Naginata classes began in the city of Rosario, within the kendo group of the Japanese Association of Rosario, due to the proximity of this city to Santa Fe. In 2014 a practice group formed in Buenos Aires made up of kendo practitioners. One of its members, Martin Andreotti, began in 2018 to travel regularly to São Paulo, to the Associação de Naginata do Brasil, led by Yasue Morita sensei, in order to train and obtain the respective degrees. The First International Naginata Seminar in Argentina was held in November 2019.

=== Australia ===
The Australian Naginata Federation has three clubs, in Pymble, New South Wales, Adelaide, South Australia and West Melbourne, Victoria. The Australian Naginata Federation hosted an International Naginata Federation Seminar in 2000 and in 2026 in Melbourne.

=== Brazil ===
==== Atarashii Naginata ====
Atarashii Naginata was practiced in the Japanese community during the pre-World War II period, but there are practically no records about it. The most outstanding teacher at the time was Shizu Furumoto sensei.

The practice of Naginata in Brazil began in 1987 when Hatsue Takahashi sensei came from Japan and gave demonstrations in São Paulo, forming the first group of practitioners. This small group gradually grew, with guidance from the same teacher, Takahashi, who sporadically came to Brazil.

In 1993, the Associação de Naginata do Brasil (ANB) was created, bringing together practitioners and enthusiasts of Atarashii Naginata. It was accepted as the eighth member of the International Naginata Federation. In 1993, Brazil participated in the 3rd International Friendship Tournament held in Los Angeles. In 1995, the 1st World Championship took place in Tokyo, with the participation of Brazil. In 1995, Brazil participated in the Seminar and Tournament in Yamagata, Japan. In 1996, Brazil hosted the 4th International Friendship Tournament in São Paulo. In 2018, Brazil hosted the International Naginata Seminar in São Paulo.

Currently in Brazil there is a teacher authorized by the International Naginata Federation to teach Atarashii Naginata in São Paulo, Canoas, Porto Alegre and Manaus. There are Naginata study groups supervised by ANB in Argentina, Chile, Mexico and Uruguay.

==== Koryū Naginata ====
In Brazil, Naginatajutsu of the Suiō-ryū and Tenshin Shōden Katori Shintō-ryū styles is practiced within the Brazilian Kobudo Confederation (CBKOb). Teaching within CBKob is done by its president, sensei Jorge Kishikawa and other teachers connected to him. They are affiliated with Nihon Kobudō Kyokai (headquartered in Tokyo) – NKK – and authorized to teach Suiō-ryū by sōke (宗家) (chief instructor) Katsuse Yoshimitsu Katsuse.

The practice within CBKob also covers shiai (sparring) using bōgu equipped with sune-ate (shin guards). Combat is carried out between two Naginatas (Category Naginata) and between Naginatas and swords (Category Kobudô Ishu Jiai). In this practice, the rules and techniques used differ from those of Atarashi Naginata.

=== Canada ===
The Canadian Naginata Federation was founded in 2003. Canada joined the International Naginata Federation as its 11th member. The first Canadian National Championship was held in Edmonton, Alberta in 2006. In 2007 Canada competed in the 4th World Naginata Championships in Brussels. Canada hosted the International Naginata Federation International Naginata Seminar in Montréal in 2010. Canada hosted the 6th World Naginata Championships in 2015 at the McGill University Sports Centre in Montréal. It was the first time the Championships were held in Canada. Twelve countries participated. In 2024, a Canadian university student delegation attended the 42nd All Japan Student Naginata Federation Seminar in Tokyo.

There are eight Naginata dōjō in Canada, under the Canadian Naginata Federation: two in Toronto, four in Montreal, one in Edmonton and one in Québec City, and three probationary dōjō in Burnaby, British Columbia, Edmonton and Sudbury, Northern Ontario.

=== Chile ===
At the end of 2018, Jaime López, a martial arts instructor, participated in the Naginata Seminar of the Associação de Naginata do Brasil, presided over by sensei Morita Yasue, where he obtained permission to start a study group in Santiago. During 2019, the study group participated in the Naginata Annual Seminar in São Paulo hosted by the Associação de Naginata do Brasil. During October 2022, Chile hosted the 3rd Latin American Naginata Seminar. 2023 was the year of the 2nd Naginata Seminar in Chile and the official foundation of the Asociación Naginata de Chile. Training is in Providencia, Valparaíso, Macul, Lampa and La Pintana.

=== Europe ===
The European Naginata Federation (ENF) has 15 member countries: Belgium, Britain, Czech Republic, Estonia, Finland, France, Germany, Israel, Italy, the Netherlands, Portugal, Russia, Spain, Sweden and Switzerland. It develops and administers Naginata in Europe and Africa, where it conducts Seminars, runs tournaments and conducts ranking examinations. It is a member of the International Naginata Federation.

==== Belgium ====
The Fédération belge de Naginata was founded in 1990 and has two clubs, in Brussels and Audergem. In 2007, the 4th World Naginata Championships were held in Brussels.

==== Britain ====
The British Naginata Association (BNA) was established in 2005. It hosted the 9th European Naginata Championships in Stevenage in 2014. The BNF has three dōjō, in London and Birmingham.

==== Czech Republic ====
Founded in 1997, Naginata Gorenkai is the only Naginata club in the Czech Republic, located in Prague.

==== Estonia ====
In 2021, the Estonian Naginata Federation (EENF) and the Tallinn Naginata Club "Amatsubame 雨燕 Kai" were established. The Estonian Naginata Federation has been a member of the European Naginata Federation since 2022. The dōjō is located in Tallinn.

==== Finland ====
Atarashii Naginata training began in Helsinki in 2009. The Suomen Kendoliitto (Finnish Kendo Association) was recognized as a member of the European Naginata Federation in 2013. Finland was proposed as a provisional member of the International Naginata Federation by the European Naginata Federation in 2014. Training is held in Helsinki.

==== France ====
Naginata was first practised in France in 1973. The first Naginata club was created in France in 1981. The French Federation of Naginata is the largest in Europe. There are clubs in Paris, Blanquefort, Boulogne-Billancourt, Le Bouscat, Chambéry, Le Chesnay-Rocquencourt, Couilly-Pont-aux-Dames, Limoges, Maisons-Alfort, Saint-Germain-en-Laye, Strasbourg, Toulouse, Vannes, Versailles and Wintzenheim. Paris hosted the 2nd World Naginata Championships in 1999.

==== Germany ====
After its foundation in 2003, the Deutscher Naginata Bund (DNagB) (German Naginata Federation) participated in the European Naginata Championships in 2005. They competed at the 4th World Championships in 2007 in Brussels as new members of the International Naginata Federation. DNagB hosted the 7th European Championships in 2010 in Mainz-Laubenheim. The 7th World Naginata Championships were held in Wiesbaden in 2019. There are groups in Berlin, Mainz, Ingelheim, Dellfeld, Leverkusen and Potsdam.

==== Italy ====
The Confederazione Italiana Kendo (Italian Kendo Confederation) (CIK) is responsible for promoting Naginata in Italy. It is a member of the European Naginata Federation and of the International Naginata Federation. Italy participated in the 11th European Naginata Championships in Mérignac in 2018 and in the 7th Naginata World Championships in Wiesbaden in 2019. They hosted the 13th European Naginata Championships in 2023, in Modena.

==== Israel ====
The Israeli Naginata Federation (ISRNF) was accepted into the European Naginata Federation in 2015.

==== The Netherlands ====
The Nederlandse Naginata Renmei (NNR) has dōjō in Berkel en Rodenrijs, Tilburg, Utrecht and Rotterdam. The European Championships of 1997 and 2008 were organized in the Netherlands.

==== Portugal ====
Naginata in Portugal started around 2006, with the first group established in Braga in 2012 by Charlotte Vandersleyen sensei and another in Lisbon in 2019. In 2019 the Associação Portuguesa de Naginata (the Portuguese Naginata Federation) held the European Naginata Federation Seminar in Braga. In 2023 the first official Portuguese National Championships was held in Braga. Associação Portuguesa de Naginata (APNagi) is based in Braga.

==== Russia ====
The Inter Regional Naginata Association (Russia) started in 2013. There are clubs in Saint Petersburg, Moscow, Petrozavodsk and Norilsk.

==== Spain ====
The practice of Atarashii Naginata began in Spain in 2018, introduced to the country by Leandro Pereira Zapata. The Asociación Cultural Matsu Nihon Budo was founded in 2019. The first National Seminar organized by Naginata Spain was held in May 2026 in Martorell.

==== Sweden ====
Svenska KendoFörbundet (SKF) has a club in Stockholm which teaches Naginata.

==== Switzerland ====
The Swiss Naginata Federation has two clubs, in Schaffhausen and Winterthur.

=== Mexico ===
During 2007, the first Naginata training session in Mexico was held, led by Shoko Hazama. Regular training continued in two groups: one led by Shoko Hazama at the Villa Olímpica sports center in Mexico City and another led by Francisco Manuel Ávila García at the Benemérita Universidad Autónoma de Puebla. In August 2022, the First International Naginata Seminar was held in Mexico with the presence of sensei Kate Roche from the Greater New York Naginata Federation (GNYNF). Study groups in Puebla, Mexico City and Lerma are affiliated with the Associação de Naginata do Brasil. There are other study groups in Puebla and Mexico City affiliated with the GNYNF.

=== Taiwan ===
The Taiwan Naginata Association is based in Zhongshan District, Taipei.

=== New Zealand ===
The New Zealand Kendo Federation has three clubs practising Naginata, in Auckland, Wellington and Dunedin.

=== Uruguay ===
The practice of Naginata in Uruguay began thanks to a seminar given by sensei Hiroyashi Ishiide in 2012. At that time the group was small and they practiced with the help of their kendo partners. Since August 2020, the Naginata movement in Uruguay has had a new beginning. The study group in Uruguay is based in Montevideo at two dōjō.

=== United States ===
The United States Naginata Federation consists of six regional federations: East Coast Naginata Federation (ECNF) (San Juan, Puerto Rico, Blacksburg, Virginia, Manassas Park, Virginia, Washington, D.C., Silver Spring, Maryland, Storrs, Connecticut, South Hadley, Massachusetts; Greater New York Naginata Federation (GNYNF) (Manhattan, Brooklyn, Cambridge, Massachusetts, Columbia, Maryland, Mexico City, Seoul); Northern California Naginata Federation (NCNF) (San Francisco, Palo Alto, California, Redwood City, California); Pacific Northwest Naginata Federation (PNNF) (Bellevue, Washington, Richland, Washington); Rocky Mountain Federation (RMNF) (Boulder, Colorado, Champaign–Urbana, Illinois); MidWest Naginata Federation (MWNF) (St. Louis, Chicago, Columbus, Ohio, Van Nuys, California); and Southern California Naginata Federation (SCNF) (Torrance, California, Gardena, California, Pasadena, California, Irvine, California, Phoenix, Arizona, Lincoln, Nebraska). The 3rd World Naginata Championships were held at San Jose State University, in San Jose, California in 1999. The 8th World Naginata Championships were held at the University of Colorado Boulder, in Boulder in 2024.

== World Naginata Championships ==
In 1995, the 1st World Naginata Championships took place in Tokyo, Japan.

In 1999, the 2nd World Naginata Championships took place in Paris, France.

In 2003, the 3rd World Naginata Championships took place in San Jose, California.

In 2007, the 4th World Naginata Championships took place in Brussels, Belgium.

In 2011, the 5th World Naginata Championships took place in Himeji, Japan.

In 2015, the 6th World Naginata Championships took place in Montréal, Canada.

In 2019, the 7th World Naginata Championships took place in Wiesbaden, Germany. Teams from 14 countries participated.

In 2024, the 8th World Naginata Championships took place in Boulder, Colorado.

In 2027, the 9th World Naginata Championships are scheduled to take place at the Tokyo Budokan on July 3, 2027 in Ayase, Tokyo, Japan.

== European Naginata Championships ==
The European Naginata Championships were originally held once every four years, but are now held biannually.

16th – 2028 scheduled in the Netherlands

15th – 2026 Maisons-Alfort, France

14th – 2025 Uppsala, Sweden

13th – 2023 Modena, Italy

12th – 2022 Brussels, Belgium

11th – 2018 Mérignac, France

10th – 2016 Brussels, Belgium

9th – 2014 Stevenage, England

8th – 2012 Prague, Czech Republic

7th – 2010 Mainz, Germany

6th – 2008 Arnemuiden, Netherlands

5th – 2005 Tours, France

4th – 2002 Paris, France

3rd – 2001 Brussels, Belgium

2nd – 1997 Breda, Netherlands

1st – 1993 Brussels, Belgium

== Popular culture ==
- Teenage Mutant Ninja Turtles features naginatajutsu being used by Donatello and Karai in the 2012 TV series, Cassandra Jones in Rise of the Teenage Mutant Ninja Turtles, and Usagi Yojimbo and the Karai Bots in the 2003 TV series. It was sometimes used by Leonardo in the 2003 and 2012 TV series.
- Naginatajutsu was used by most of the women of Tataraba/Iron Town in Princess Mononoke.

== Bibliography ==
- Bennett, Alexander (July 1, 2016). Naginata. History and Practice. Bunkasha International. ISBN 9784907009205.
- Nippon Budokan, ed. (October 10, 2009). Budō: The Martial Ways of Japan. Translated by Bennett, Alexander. Bunkasha International. ISBN 978-4990169459.
- Knutsen, Roald; Knutsen, Patricia (September 30, 2004). Japanese Spears: Polearms and Their Use in Old Japan. Folkestone: Global Oriental. ISBN 9781901903560.
- All Japan Naginata Federation, ed. (1990). Illustrated Naginata (PDF). All Japan Naginata Federation.
- Knutsen, Roald M. (January 1, 1963). Japanese Polearms (pdf). London: Holland Press. ISBN 9780900470233. Archived from the original on October 28, 2022 – via Internet Archive.
- Otake, Risuke (June 3, 2009). Le sabre et le divin - Naginata bo so-jutsu: Héritage spirituel de la Tenshin Shoden Katori Shinto Ryu (in French). Translated by Melin, Valérie. Budo. ISBN 978-2846171403.
- Morikane, Tatsuya (September 21, 2026). Weapons of the Samurai: Katana, Yari, Naginata, and the Arms of Japan’s Warrior Class. Independently published. ISBN 9798176049268.
- Montgomery, Richardson Ibragimov (January 14, 2025). History of Naginatajutsu: The Evolution of a Samurai's Weapon. Independently published. ISBN 9798306995328.
- Richardson, Paul (November 21, 2024). Kukishinden Ryu Sojutsu, Naginata, Bisento. Independently published. ISBN 9798300785802.
- Mihara Naginata School, ed. (2005). Naginata Course: Basics and Body Movement Explained with Photos (in Japanese). Mihara Naginata School.
- All Japan Naginata Federation, ed. (2003). New Naginata Class (in Japanese). All Japan Naginata Federation.
- Tokunaga, Chiyoko (1992). Intro to Naginata (in Japanese).
- Inagaki, Genshiro (1983). Nihon no Budo - Book 6: Kyudo & Naginata (in Japanese). Tokyo: Kodansha.
- Shigehachi, Sonobe (1980). Illustrated Coach Naginata (in Japanese).
- All Japan Naginata Federation, ed. (1977). Atarashii Naginata (in Japanese). All Japan Naginata Federation.
- Doobub (June 23, 2020). Naginatajutsu: Martial Arts Journal with Drawing Section. Independently published. ISBN 979-8656319621.
