= Tenshin Bukō-ryū Heihō =

Japanese koryū martial art

Tenshin Bukō-ryū heihō (formerly Toda-ha Bukō-ryū) (天真武甲流兵法)
- Ko-ryū

Foundation
- Founder: Toda Seigen (戸田 清眼)
- Date founded: c. 1560
- Period founded: Late Muromachi period (1337-1573)

Current information
- Current headmaster: Kent Sorensen (sokedairi)

Arts taught
- Art: Description
- naginatajutsu: Glaive art
- sōjutsu: Spear art
- bōjutsu: Staff art
- kenjutsu: Sword art
- kusarigamajutsu: Chain-and-sickle art

Tenshin Bukō-ryū heihō (天真武甲流兵法) is a Japanese koryū martial art which has its roots in the Toda-ryū, founded in the late Muromachi period c. 1560 by Toda Seigen (戸田 清眼).

== Weapons used ==
The ryū contains an extensive curriculum of weapon-arts centering on naginatajutsu (naginata, kagitsuki naginata (a naginata with a small cross-bar beneath the blade, used for deflecting, trapping and breaking enemy's weaponry), & nagamaki, but also sōjutsu, bōjutsu kenjutsu and kusarigamajutsu.

== History ==
Toda-ryu was adopted by the Suneya family in the mountainous Chichibu region. Among other weapons, the clan apparently focused on the naginata, and its study, over many generations, was known as Suneya-kei naginatajutsu.

In the mid-1800s, Suneya Ryōsuke and Suneya Sato-o, husband and wife, initiated a renaissance of the martial tradition. This became the Toda-ha Bukō-ryū. From Ryōsuke and Sato-o, Toda-ha Bukō-ryū divided into two lines, one located in its ancestral home in Chichibu and the other in Tokyo.

The Chichibu line died out in the first part of the 20th century. The Tokyo line was continued by Komatsuzaki Koto-o and Yazawa Isao, two students of the Suneya. Most of their students are unknown, and with one exception, there is little evidence that any of them continued teaching in subsequent generations. The sole exception was Murakami Hideo, who was first a student of Komatsuzaki and then Yazawa. Only one of her students, Kobayashi Seio, continued the line, which she then passed to Nitta Suzuo, the 19th generation sōke. She was followed by the 20th generation sōke, Nakamura Yoichi.

Before his untimely death, Nakamura appointed Kent Sorensen, director of central Funabashi dojo in Chiba, Japan, as sōkedairi of Toda-ha Bukō-ryū. In 2022, Sorensen, with the support of all shihan (licensed instructors), initiated a second renaissance of the school, changing the name to Tenshin Bukō-ryū heihō. Beyond the Funabashi dojo, there are active dojo in France, the United States, Canada and Australia.
