= Kusarigamajutsu =

Japanese martial art using the kusarigama

Kusarigamajutsu (鎖鎌術:くさりがまじゅつ) is the art of using the Japanese weapon kusarigama.

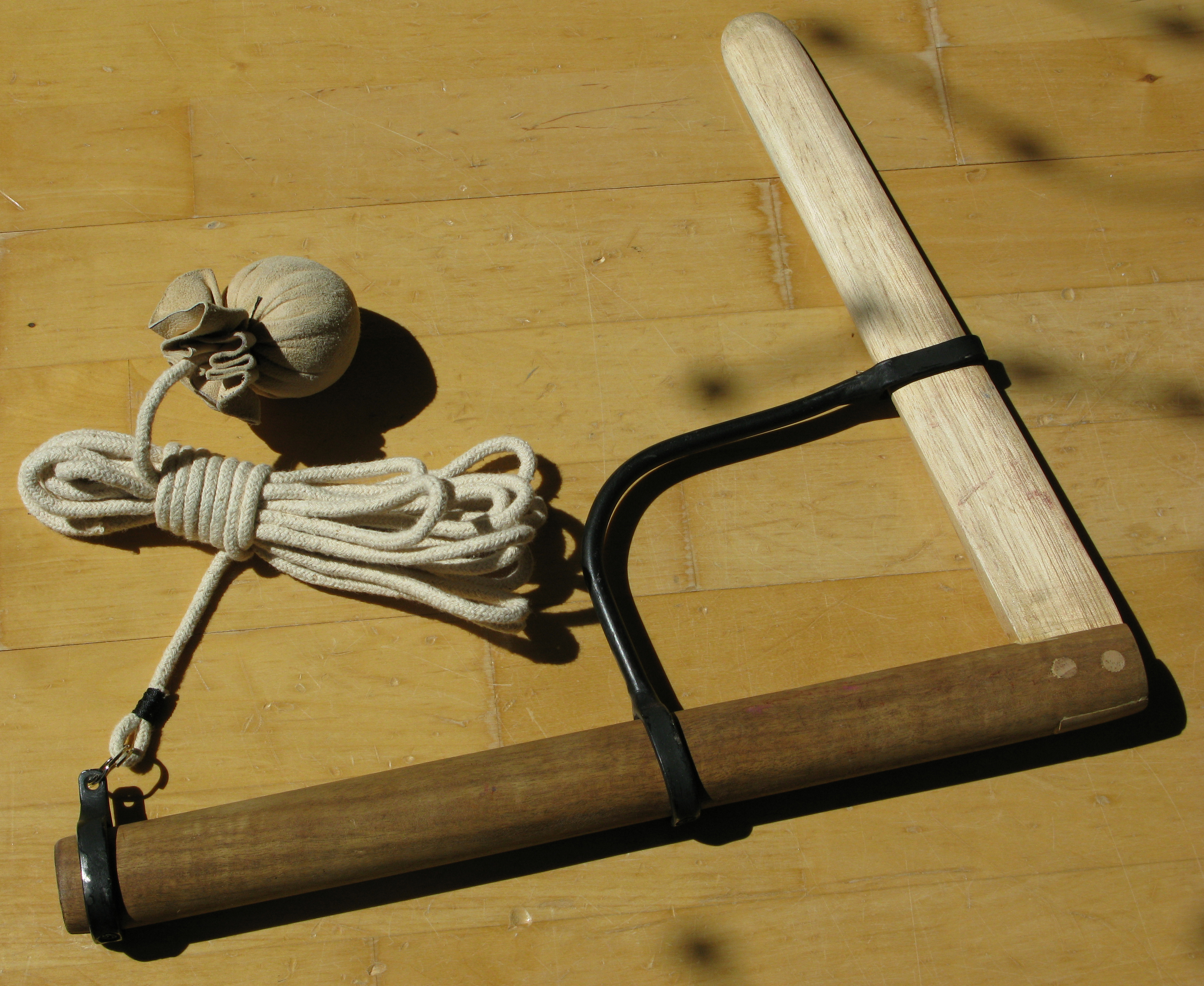
Isshin-ryu Kusarigama

Kusarigamajutsu is featured in several separate martial arts such as Tendō-ryū, Suiō-ryū and Shintō Musō-ryū. The kusarigama is made up of three parts: the kama (a wooden handle with a curved blade (traditionally straight) protruding at a right-angle on one end, and a small loop at the other), and the kusari (a chain attached to the kama) and a weight at the end of the chain. In a confrontation the kusari is swung in wide sweeping arcs to distract and entangle the opponent and the kama is used to deliver a fatal strike.

== Popular culture ==
- Teenage Mutant Ninja Turtles features kusarigamajutsu being used by Michaelangelo and Shini in the 2012 version. It was also used by Karai, the boar assassin Kojima, one of the Triceraton All-Stars, and some of the Foot Ninjas as well as some Karai Bots in the 2003 version.
- In 2025 action role-playing game Assassin's Creed Shadows kusarigama is one of the weapons used by the female protagonist, kunoichi Fujibayashi Naoe, and she is able to learn different kusarigamajutsu moves as the game progresses.

== See also ==
- Araki-ryū – Koryū that includes the use of the kusarigama
- Suiō-ryū – Koryū that includes the use of the kusarigama via the attached school of Masaki-ryū Fukuhara-ha kusarigamajutsu
- Toda-ha Bukō-ryū – Koryū that includes the use of the kusarigama
- Isshin-ryū kusarigamajutsu – School of kusarigamajutsu found in Shintō Musō-ryū
- Tendō-ryū kusarigamajutsu – School of kusarigamajutsu found in Tendō-ryū bujutsu

== Sources ==
- Pascal Krieger: Jodô – la voie du bâton / The way of the stick (bilingual French/English), Geneva (CH) 1989, ISBN 2-9503214-0-2
