= Nen-ryū =

- Ko-ryū

Foundation
- Founder: Sōma Shiro Yoshimoto (相馬 四郎 義元, fl. c.14th century)
- Date founded: 1368
- Period founded: Nanboku-chō period (1336–1392)
- Location founded: modern day Nagano Prefecture

Current information
- Current headmaster: None
- Current headquarters: None

Ancestor schools
- None identified

Nen-ryū (念流) is a traditional (koryū) school of Japanese martial arts founded in 1368 CE by the samurai Sōma Shiro Yoshimoto (c.14th century) in modern-day Nagano Prefecture, where Yoshimoto is said to have taught only fourteen students until his death.
