= Higo Ko-ryu =

Japanese martial art

Higo Ko-ryu (肥後古流, Higo koryū) is a Japanese koryū martial art founded in unknown time, but likely in early Edo period or before, by Kame Terushige (亀井 輝重). Its name means "Old Tradition of Higo", meaning it was already old during time when first written records about it appeared.

According to ryūha's own records, founder Kame Terushige created this martial way from techniques passed to him by unknown teachers and bequeathed it to Matsumoto Genjiro, who was associated with the Higo clan of mountainous Higo Province of Kyushu.

The system teaches naginatajutsu. The naginata of Higo Ko-ryu is unique: shaft and blade are both four feet long. The weapon this school studies was archaic already in the sixteenth century.
