= Suiō-ryū =

Japanese style of swordsmanship

Suiō-ryū Iai Kenpō (水鷗流 居合 剣法)
- Ko-ryū
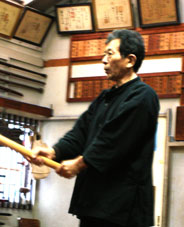
- The 15th sōke of Suiō-ryū, Katsuse Yoshimitsu Kagehiro

Foundation
- Founder: Mima Yoichizaemon Kagenobu
- Date founded: c. 1600
- Period founded: Late Sengoku period (c. 1467–c. 1603)

Current information
- Current headmaster: Katsuse Yoshimitsu Kagehiro (15th generation headmaster)

Arts taught
- Art: Description
- Iaijutsu: Art of drawing the sword
- Kenpō: Sword art
- Jōjutsu: Staff art
- Naginatajutsu: Glaive art
- Kusarigamajutsu: Sickle and chain art
- Kogusoku: Semi-armoured grappling
- Wakizashi: Techniques for side sword

Ancestor schools
- Hayashizaki-ryū, Kongo Jō jōhō, Bokuden-ryū

Suiō-ryū Iai Kenpō (水鷗流 居合 剣法) is a style of classical Japanese swordsmanship. It was founded by Mima Yoichizaemon Kagenobu at the end of the Sengoku period. The style specialises in iaijutsu but other arts, such as jōjutsu, naginatajutsu and kusarigamajutsu are practised as well.

== History ==
Mima Yoichizaemon Kagenobu (1577–1665) was born in the Dewa Province to Mima Saigū, a priest at the Jūnisha Gongen Shrine. In his youth he studied the Bokuden-ryū of swordsmanship, as well as a style of jō practiced by Shintō mountain priests (Kongō Jō jōhō).

When he was 18, he was beaten in a friendly duel by his father's friend, the samurai Sakurai Gorōemon Naomitsu, who had utilized iai-techniques of the Hayashizaki school, and afterwards began to study under him. After being given an overview of those techniques and vowing to create a style of his own, Yoichizaemon travelled throughout Japan, to test his skills against other martial artists. During this period he trained in the naginatajutsu of the Buddhist monks from Mount Hiei, techniques that were applied often by the monks during the Warring States period.

Yoichizaemon was not content to develop only the physical side of his martial arts during this time. Instead, he continued training in ascetic practices, and meditated nightly, even going so far as to go on long retreats to secluded holy sites deep in the mountains. His perseverance in both his physical and spiritual training led to his eventual enlightenment. In the twentieth year of his exertions, he was struck with a vision of white gulls floating effortlessly and without conscious thought on water, and realised he could now use his sword in the same effortless manner.

Based on his vision Yoichizaemon created the traditions 64 core techniques and named the style that arose from his revelation the "Suiō-ryū", or Water-Gull style of swordsmanship.

The spiritual, philosophical aspects of the tradition permeate the Suiō-ryū's techniques, and the core waza, or techniques, are directly linked to Mima's teachings based on Ryōbu Shintō, a system of interpreting Shintō deities into Mikkyō Buddhism.

Yoichizaemon continued training and travelling throughout his life, and at age 67 retired to pass the Suiō-ryū to his son, Mima Yohachirō Kagenaga. To the core techniques established by the founder, Yohachirō added the ten basic Goin and Goyō forms, which serve to establish strong basic technique. The 9th sōke Fukuhara Shinzaemon Kagenori created Masaki-ryū Fukuhara-ha Kusarigamajutsu, in part based on the Masaki-ryū of Manrikigusari, which has been handed down ever since as a separate tradition to each headmaster of the Suiō-ryū Iai Kenpō. The tradition of oral transmission of techniques continues to the present day, in the person of the 15th sōke of Suiō-ryū Iai Kenpō, Katsuse Yoshimitsu Kagehiro (also iaidō kyōshi 7. dan, kendo kyōshi 7. dan, jōdō renshi 6. dan). The headquarters of the tradition, the Hekiunkan ("Hall of Blue Clouds"), is located at Shizuoka City, Shizuoka prefecture, Japan.

== Curriculum ==
The Suiō-ryū is a comprehensive martial tradition with a focus on iai-techniques. Among the forms practiced are the following sets:

- Goyō - Basic offensive techniques from seiza (5 kata)
- Goin - Basic defensive techniques from seiza (5 kata)
- Tachi-iai - Standing forms (9 kata)
- Kuyō - Advanced forms from seiza (9 kata)
- Kumi-iai - Paired standing techniques (9 kata)
- Several sets of kage-waza, "shadow techniques", that offer counters and answers to the variables in the Kuyo, Tachi-iai and Kumi-iai kata-sets (27 kata total)
- Yami - a set of both offensive and defensive techniques intended to be of use when the practitioner finds themselves in complete darkness

Most of the solo kata can be, and are, also practiced with a partner, often with the aid of another kata, i.e. by pairing an offensive kata with one that offers a suitable defensive response.

In addition, there are also a large number of forms for other weapons.

- Jōhō - Techniques for the staff (both jō against sword, jō against jō) and short staff
- Kogusoku - Semi-armored, armed grappling techniques
- Naginatajutsu - Techniques for the glaive, both naginata against sword and naginata against naginata. In addition there is also a set of solo kata against cavalry
- Kenpō - Battlefield sword against sword forms, also forms for a short sword
- Wakizashi - Techniques for the companion sword
- Kusarigamajutsu - Techniques for the sickle and chain, both against a long sword and two swords (This is actually a separate tradition, Masaki-ryū Fukuhara-ha Kusarigamajutsu)

== Succession ==
The founder's son Yohachirō succeeded his father to become the 2nd head of the tradition and the lineage has continued unbroken to the present day. Traditionally, the kage waza were shared only with the successor to the tradition, in a form of transmission called isshi sōden. However, now nearly all of the physical techniques of the tradition are taught openly. Even today though, one set of iai kata, which represent the very essence of the tradition's teachings, is set aside only for communication to the tradition's next sōke.

The line of succession is as follows:

1. Mima Yoichizaemon Kagenobu, the founder
2. Mima Yohachirō Kagenaga
3. Akiyama Sangorō Kagemitsu
4. Nishino Shichizaemon Kageharu
5. Yoshino Tōbei Kagetoshi
6. Yoshino Tōzaburō Ietaka
7. Yoshino Tōgebei Sadamitsu
8. Yoshino Yaichirō Sadatoshi
9. Fukuhara Shinzaemon Kagenori
10. Fukuhara Shingorō Iesada
11. Fukuhara Jūjirō Sadayoshi
12. Fukuhara Shinbei Yoshisada
13. Mizuma Hanbei Kagetsugu
14. Katsuse Mitsuyasu Kagemasa
15. Katsuse Yoshimitsu Kagehiro, the current sōke

== Grades ==
Instead of the modern kyū- and dan-grades, Suiō-ryū, like most other koryū, uses a more traditional menjō system of licenses. These licenses are, from lowest to highest, Shoden, Chūden, Shō Mokuroku, Chū Mokuroku, Dai Mokuroku, Shō Menkyo, Menkyo Kaiden and Inka. The Inka license is given only to the successor to the tradition and is not accessible to others. These licenses act as recognition from the sōke that the practitioner has demonstrated a physical and mental progression in the tradition and later that they have his permission to transmit the teachings of the ryu.

As is also common in classical schools, to properly learn its teachings the practitioner must formally join the school through an oath, keppan. In this oath the future member swears not to teach or demonstrate Suiō-ryū without the permission of the sōke to preserve the school's integrity.

== In popular culture ==
The writer of the popular manga series Kozure Ookami (子連れ狼) or Lone Wolf and Cub, Koike Kazuo utilized the name of the Suio ryu for the style of swordsmanship practiced by the protagonist of the series. After learning of its actual existence he visited the headquarters of the tradition in Shizuoka, called the Hekiunkan, to pay his respects. Later, the fight choreographer of the second series of the TV show, featuring Yorozuya Kinnosuke, visited the Hekiunkan and impressed with the movements of the tradition spent some time learning the kata of the school. In the final series of this TV show, the actual kata from the tradition are performed and referenced in amongst the other more stylized movements.
