= Japanese martial arts =

Japanese martial artists Nakayama Hakudō, Kyuzo Mifune and Futabayama Sadaji photographed with martial arts patron Kinoshita Tomosaburo (second from the left).

Japanese martial arts refers to the variety of martial arts native to the country of Japan. At least three Japanese terms (budō, bujutsu, and bugei) are used interchangeably with the English phrase Japanese martial arts.

The usage of the term budō (武道) to mean martial arts is a modern one: historically the term meant a way of life encompassing physical, spiritual and moral dimensions with a focus on self-improvement, fulfillment or personal growth. The terms bujutsu (武術) and bugei (武芸) have different meanings from budō, at least historically speaking. Bujutsu refers specifically to the practical application of martial tactics and techniques in actual combat. Bugei refers to the adaptation or refinement of those tactics and techniques to facilitate systematic instruction and dissemination within a formal learning environment.

Translations of Japanese martial arts
Term	Translation
budō (武道)	martial way
bujutsu (武術)	martial technique alternatively science, art or craft of war
bugei (武芸)	martial art

== History ==
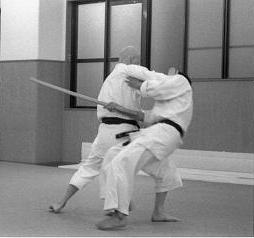
Disarming an attacker using a tachi-dori (太刀取り; "sword-taking") technique

Each child who grew up in a samurai family was expected to be a warrior when he grew up, so much of his childhood was spent practicing different martial arts. A complete samurai should be skilled at least in the use of the sword (kenjutsu), the bow and arrow (kyujutsu), the spear (sojutsu, yarijutsu), the halberd (naginatajutsu) and subsequently the use of firearms (houjutsu). Similarly, they were instructed in the use of these weapons while riding a horse. They were also expected to know how to swim and dive.

Nihon Eiho (日本泳法, Japanese swimming style) originates from the Sengoku period in the 15th century. The samurai developed Suijutsu (水術, (combat) water skills), which was useful in case they were thrown overboard during naval conflicts. The samurai practiced Katchu gozen oyogi (甲冑御前游, full armor swimming), Tachi-oyogi (立ち泳ぎ, standing swimming) and Ina-tobi (鯔飛, flying mullet) to board enemy vessels. Activities included strokes with swords, bows and firearms. Hands were kept dry above the water to write messages with an ink brush on a paper scroll. This skill was useful for muskets which require dry gunpowder. Nihon Eiho is practiced by 28 schools and recognized by the Japan Swimming Federation.

During the feudal era of Japan, various types of martial arts flourished, known in Japanese under the name of bujutsu (武術). The term jutsu can be translated as "method", "art" or "technique" and the name that each one has is indicative of the mode or weapon with which they are executed. The combat methods that were developed and perfected are very diverse, among which are:

Ordinarily, the development of combative techniques is intertwined with the tools used to execute those techniques. In a rapidly changing world, those tools are constantly changing, requiring that the techniques to use them be continuously reinvented. The history of Japan is somewhat unusual in its relative isolation. Compared with the rest of the world, the Japanese tools of war evolved slowly. Many people believe that this afforded the warrior class the opportunity to study their weapons in greater depth than other cultures. Nevertheless, the teaching and training of these martial arts did evolve. For example, in the early medieval period, the bow and the spear were emphasized, but during the Tokugawa period (1603–1867 CE), fewer large-scale battles took place, and the sword became the most prestigious weapon. Another trend that developed throughout Japanese history was that of increasing martial specialization as society became more stratified over time.

The martial arts developed or originating in Japan are extraordinarily diverse, with vast differences in training tools, methods, and philosophy across innumerable schools and styles. That said, Japanese martial arts may generally be divided into koryū and gendai budō based on whether they existed prior to or after the Meiji Restoration (1868), respectively. Since gendai budō and koryū often share the same historical origin, one will find various types of martial arts (such as jujutsu, kenjutsu, or naginatajutsu) on both sides of the divide.

A note on the organization of this article; it would be impossible to discuss Japanese martial arts in terms of the thousands of individual schools or styles, such as Ittō-ryū, Daitō-ryū, or Tenshin Shōden Katori Shintō-ryū. Instead, major sections are divided based on when the art originated (regardless of whether it is still practiced), and subsections are dedicated to the root type of martial art, such as jujutsu (the art of empty-handed combat through use of indirect application of force) or kendo (Japanese sport fencing), wherein notable styles or major differences between styles may be discussed.

== Koryū ==
Koryū (古流:こりゅう), meaning "traditional school", or "old school", refers specifically to schools of martial arts, originating in Japan, either prior to the beginning of the Meiji Restoration in 1868, or the Haitōrei (Sword Abolishment Edict) in 1876. In modern usage, bujutsu (武術), meaning military art/science, is typified by its practical application of technique to real-world or battlefield situations.

The term also is used generally to indicate that a particular style or art is "traditional", rather than "modern". However, what it means for an art to be either "traditional" or "modern" is subject to some debate. As a rule of thumb, the primary purpose of a koryū martial art was for use in war. The most extreme example of a koryū school is one that preserves its traditional, and often ancient, martial practices even in the absence of continuing wars in which to test them. Other koryū schools may have made modifications to their practices that reflect the passage of time (which may or may not have resulted in the loss of "koryū" status in the eyes of its peers). This is as opposed to "modern" martial arts, whose primary focus is generally upon the self-improvement (mental, physical, or spiritual) of the individual practitioner, with varying degrees of emphasis on the practical application of the martial art for either sport or self-defence purposes.

The following subsections represent not individual schools of martial arts, but rather generic "types" of martial arts. These are generally distinguishable on the basis of their training methodology and equipment, though wide variation still exists within each.

=== Sumō ===
Sumo (相撲:すもう, sumō), considered by many to be Japan's national sport, has its origins in the distant past. The earliest written records of Japan, which are dated from the 8th century AD, record the first sumo match in 23 BC, occurring specifically at the request of the emperor and continuing until one man was too wounded to continue. Beginning in 728 AD, the Emperor Shōmu (聖武天皇, 701–756) began holding official sumo matches at the annual harvest festivals. This tradition of having matches in the presence of the emperor continued, but gradually spread, with matches also held at Shintō festivals, and sumo training was eventually incorporated into military training. By the 17th century, sumo was an organized professional sport, open to the public, enjoyed by both the upper class and commoners.

Today, sumo retains much of its traditional trappings, including a referee dressed as a Shintō priest, and a ritual where the competitors clap hands, stomp their feet, and throw salt in the ring prior to each match. To win a match, competitors employ throwing and grappling techniques to force the other man to the ground; the first man to touch the ground with a part of the body other than the bottom of the feet, or touch the ground outside the ring with any part of the body, loses. Six grand tournaments are held annually in Japan, and each professional fighter's name and relative ranking is published after each tournament in an official list, called the banzuke, which is followed religiously by sumo fans.

=== Jūjutsu ===
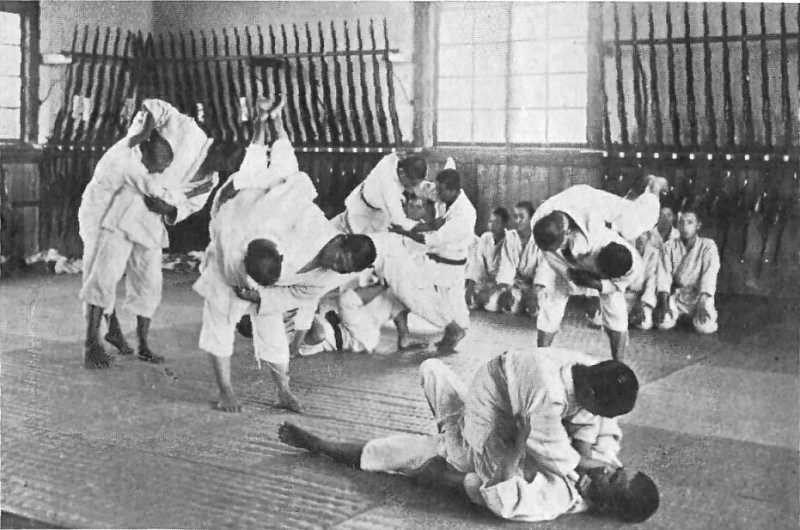
Jujutsu training at an agricultural school in Japan around 1920

Jujutsu (柔術:じゅうじゅつ, jūjutsu), literally translates to "soft skills". However, more accurately, it means the art of using indirect force, such as joint locks or throwing techniques, to defeat an opponent, as opposed to direct force such as a punch or a kick. This is not to imply that jujutsu does not teach or employ strikes, but rather that the art's aim is the ability to use an attacker's force against them, and counter-attack where they are weakest or least defended.

Methods of combat included striking (kicking, punching), throwing (body throws, joint-lock throws, unbalance throws), restraining (pinning, strangulating, grappling, wrestling) and weaponry. Defensive tactics included blocking, evading, off balancing, blending and escaping. Minor weapons such as the tantō (短刀; dagger), ryufundo kusari (weighted chain), jutte (十手; helmet-smasher), and kakushi buki (隠武器; secret or disguised weapons) were almost always included in koryū jujutsu.

Most of these were battlefield-based systems to be practiced as companion arts to the more common and vital weapon systems. At the time, these fighting arts went by many different names, including kogusoku, yawara, kumiuchi, and hakuda. In reality, these grappling systems were not really unarmed systems of combat, but are more accurately described as means whereby an unarmed or lightly armed warrior could defeat a heavily armed and armored enemy on the battlefield. Ideally, the samurai would be armed and would not need to rely on such techniques.

In later times, other koryū developed into systems more familiar to the practitioners of the jujutsu commonly seen today. These systems are generally designed to deal with opponents neither wearing armor nor in a battlefield environment. For this reason, they include extensive use of atemi waza (当て身技; vital-striking technique). These tactics would be of little use against an armored opponent on a battlefield. They would, however, be quite valuable to anyone confronting an enemy or opponent during peacetime dressed in normal street attire. Occasionally, inconspicuous weapons such as knives or tessen (鉄扇; iron fans) were included in the curriculum.

Today, jujutsu is practiced in many forms, both ancient and modern. Various methods of jujutsu have been incorporated or synthesized into judo and aikido, as well as being exported throughout the world and transformed into sport wrestling systems, adopted in whole or part by schools of karate or other unrelated martial arts, still practiced as they were centuries ago, or all of the above.

=== Swordsmanship ===
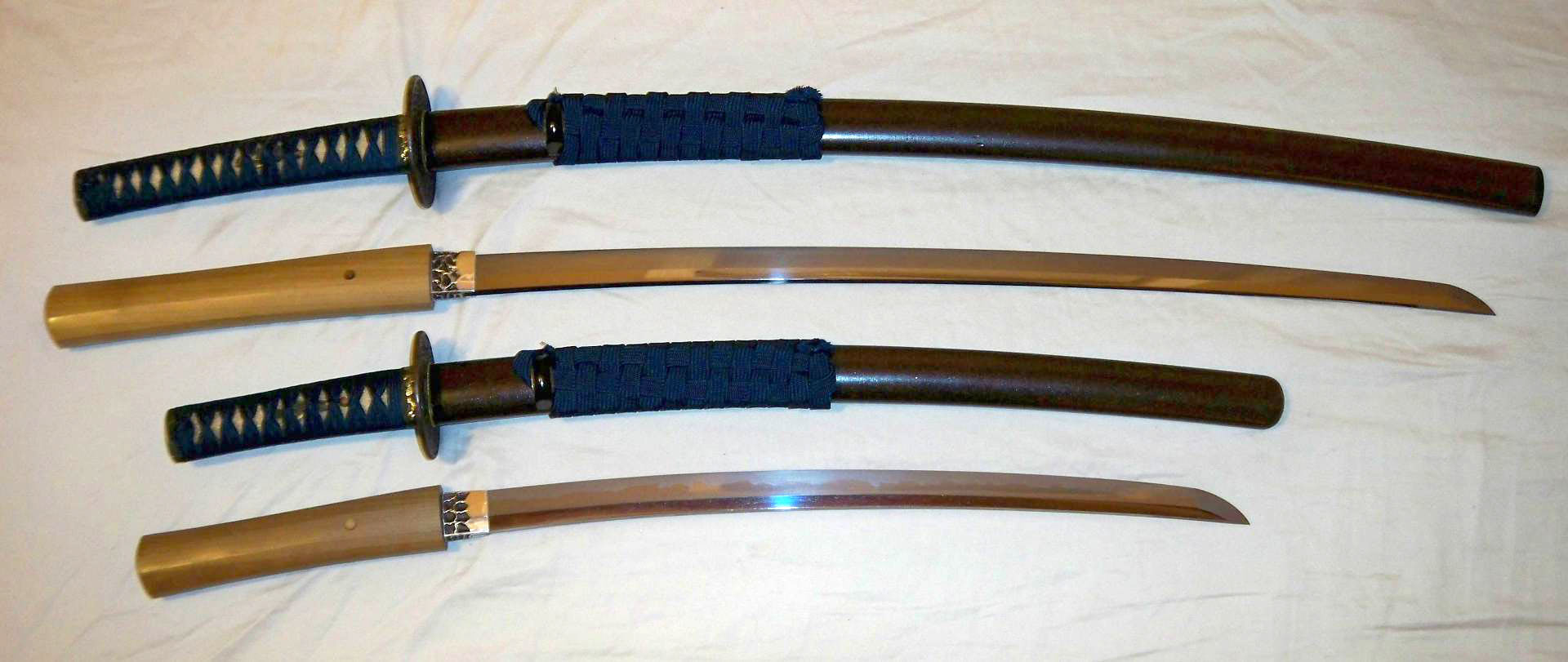
A matched set (daisho) of antique Japanese (samurai) swords and their individual mountings (koshirae), katana on top and wakisashi below, Edo period

Swordsmanship, the art of the sword, has an almost mythological ethos, and is believed by some to be the paramount martial art, surpassing all others. Regardless of the truth of that belief, the sword itself has been the subject of stories and legends through virtually all cultures in which it has been employed as a tool for violence. In Japan, the use of the katana is no different. Although originally the most important skills of the warrior class were proficiency at horse-riding and shooting the bow, this eventually gave way to swordsmanship. The earliest swords, which can be dated as far back as the Kofun era (3rd and 4th centuries) were primarily straight bladed. According to legend, curved swords made strong by the famous folding process were first forged by the smith Amakuni Yasutsuna (天國 安綱, c. 700 AD).

The primary development of the sword occurred between 987 AD and 1597 AD. This development is characterized by profound artistry during peaceful eras, and renewed focus on durability, utility, and mass production during the intermittent periods of warfare, most notably civil warfare during the 12th century and the Mongolian invasions during the 13th century (which in particular saw the transition from mostly horseback archery to hand-to-hand ground fighting).

This development of the sword is paralleled by the development of the methods used to wield it. During times of peace, the warriors trained with the sword, and invented new ways to implement it. During war, these theories were tested. After the war ended, those who survived examined what worked and what didn't, and passed their knowledge on. In 1600 AD, Tokugawa Ieyasu (徳川 家康, 1543–1616) gained total control of all of Japan, and the country entered a period of prolonged peace that would last until the Meiji Restoration. During this period, the techniques to use the sword underwent a transition from a primarily utilitarian art for killing, to one encompassing a philosophy of personal development and spiritual perfection.

The terminology used in Japanese swordsmanship is somewhat ambiguous. Many names have been used for various aspects of the art or to encompass the art as a whole.

==== Kenjutsu ====
Kenjutsu (剣術:けんじゅつ) literally means "the art/science of the sword". Although the term has been used as a general term for swordsmanship as a whole, in modern times, kenjutsu refers more to the specific aspect of swordsmanship dealing with partnered sword training. It is the oldest form of training and, at its simplest level, consists of two partners with swords drawn, practicing combat drills. Historically practiced with wooden katana (bokken; 木剣), this most often consists of pre-determined forms, called kata (型), or sometimes called kumitachi (組太刀), and similar to the partner drills practiced in kendo. Among advanced students, kenjutsu training may also include increasing degrees of freestyle practice.

==== Battōjutsu ====
Battōjutsu (抜刀術:ばっとうじゅつ), literally meaning "the art/science of drawing a sword", and developed in the mid-15th century, is the aspect of swordsmanship focused upon the efficient draw of the sword, cutting down one's enemy, and returning the sword to its scabbard (saya; 鞘). The term came into use specifically during the Warring States Period (15th–17th centuries). Closely related to, but predating iaijutsu, battōjutsu training emphasizes defensive counter-attacking. Battōjutsu training technically incorporates kata, but generally consist of only a few moves, focusing on stepping up to an enemy, drawing, performing one or more cuts, and sheathing the weapon. Battōjutsu exercises tend to lack the elaborateness, as well as the aesthetic considerations of iaijutsu or iaidō kata. Finally, note that use of the name alone is not dispositive; what is battōjutsu to one school may be iaijutsu to another.

==== Iaijutsu ====
Iaijutsu (居合術:いあいじゅつ), approximately "the art/science of mental presence and immediate reaction", is also the Japanese art of drawing the sword. However, unlike battōjutsu, iaijutsu tends to be technically more complex, and there is a much stronger focus upon perfecting form. The primary technical aspects are smooth, controlled movements of drawing the sword from its scabbard, striking or cutting an opponent, removing blood from the blade, and then replacing the sword in the scabbard.

=== Naginatajutsu ===
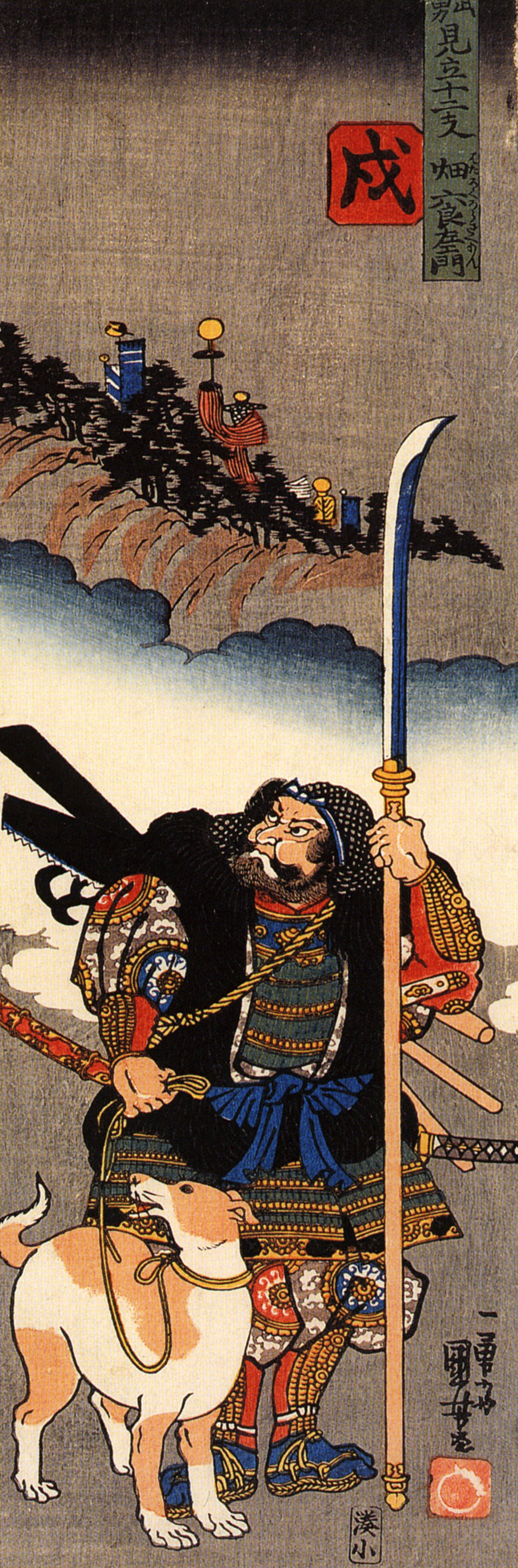
A samurai wielding a naginata

Naginatajutsu (長刀術:なぎなたじゅつ) is the Japanese art of wielding the naginata, a weapon resembling the medieval European glaive or guisarme. Most naginata practice today is in a modernized form (gendai budō) called the "way of naginata" (naginata-dō) or "new naginata" (atarashii naginata), in which competitions are also held.

However, many koryu maintain naginatajutsu in their curriculum. Also of note, during the late Edo period, naginata were used to train women and ladies in waiting. Thus, most naginatajutsu styles are headed by women and most naginata practitioners in Japan are women. This has led to the impression overseas that naginatajutsu is a martial art that was not used by male warriors. In fact, naginatajutsu was developed in early medieval Japan and for a time was widely used by samurai.

=== Sōjutsu ===
Sōjutsu (槍術:そうじゅつ) is the Japanese art of fighting with the spear (yari). For most of Japan's history, sōjutsu was practiced extensively by traditional schools. In times of war, it was a primary skill of many soldiers. Today it is a minor art taught in very few schools.

=== Shinobi no jutsu ===
Shinobi no jutsu (aka Ninjutsu) was developed by groups of people mainly from Iga, Mie and Kōka, Shiga of Japan who became noted for their skills as infiltrators, scouts, secret agents, and spies. The training of these shinobi (忍; ninja) involves espionage, sabotage, disguise, escape, concealment, assassination, archery, medicine, explosives, poisons, and more.

=== Other koryū martial arts ===
The early martial art schools of Japan were almost entirely "Sōgō bujutsu", composite martial systems made up of an eclectic collection of skills and tools. With the long peace of the Tokugawa shogunate there was an increase in specialization with many schools identifying themselves with particular major battlefield weapons. However, there were many additional weapons employed by the warriors of feudal Japan, and an art to wielding each. Usually they were studied as secondary or tertiary weapons within a school but there are exceptions, such as the art of wielding the short staff, (jōdō; 杖道) which was the primary art taught by the Shintō Musō-ryū.

Other arts existed to teach military skills other than the use of weaponry. Examples of these include marine skills such as swimming and river-fording (suijutsu; 水術), equestrianism (bajutsu; 馬術), arson and demolition (kajutsu).

== Gendai budō ==
Gendai budō (現代武道:げんだいぶどう), literally meaning "modern martial way", usually applies to arts founded after the beginning of the Meiji Restoration in 1868. Aikido and judo are examples of gendai budō that were founded in the modern era, while iaidō represents the modernization of a practice that has existed for centuries.

The core difference is, as was explained under "koryū", above, that koryū arts are practiced as they were when their primary utility was for use in warfare, while the primary purpose of gendai budō is for self-improvement, with self-defense as a secondary purpose. Additionally, many of the gendai budō have included a sporting element to them. Judo and kendo are both examples of this.

=== Judo ===
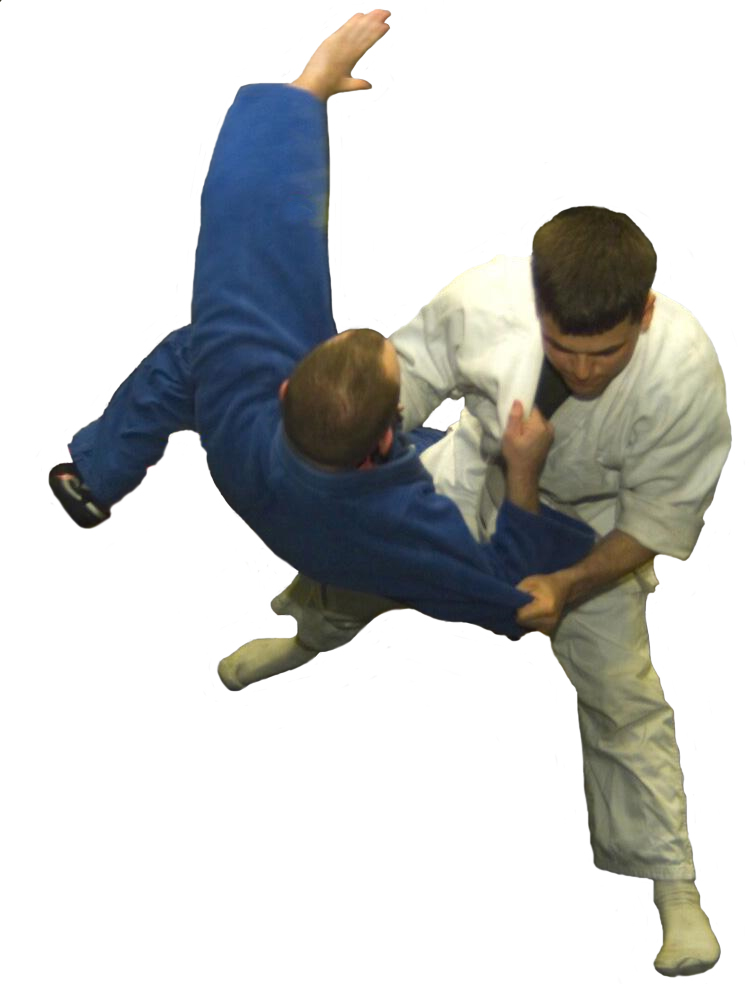
Judoka executing a throw (o-soto-gari)

Judo (柔道:じゅうどう, jūdō), literally meaning "gentle way" or "way of softness", is a grappling-based martial art, practiced primarily as a sport. It contains substantially the same emphasis on the personal, spiritual, and physical self-improvement of its practitioners as can be found throughout gendai budō.

Judo was created by Kano Jigoro (嘉納 治五郎 Kanō Jigorō, 1860–1938) at the end of the 19th century. Kano took the koryū martial arts he learned (specifically Kitō-ryū and Tenjin Shin'yo-ryū jujutsu), and systematically reinvented them into a martial art with an emphasis on freestyle practice (randori) and competition, while removing harmful jujutsu techniques or limiting them to the kata. Kano devised a powerful system of new techniques and training methods, which famously culminated on June 11, 1886, in a tournament that would later be dramatized by celebrated Japanese filmmaker Akira Kurosawa (黒沢 明 Kurosawa Akira, 1910–1998), in the film "Sanshiro Sugata" (1943).

Judo became an Olympic sport in 1964, and has spread throughout the world. Kano Jigoro's original school, the "Kodokan", has students worldwide, and many other schools have been founded by Kano's students.

=== Kendo ===
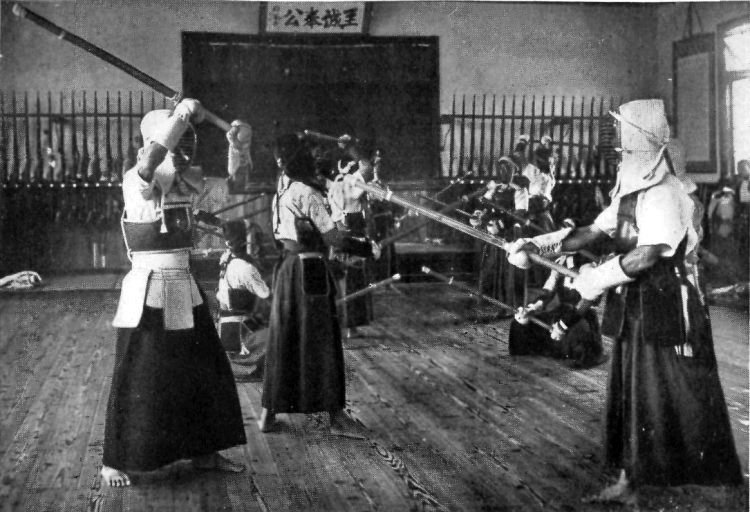
Kendo training at an agricultural school in Japan around 1920

Kendo (剣道:けんどう, kendō), meaning the "way of the sword", is based on Japanese sword-fighting. It is an evolution of the art of kenjutsu, and its exercises and practice are descended from several particular schools of swordsmanship. The primary technical influence in its development was the kenjutsu school of Ittō-ryū (founded c. 16th century), whose core philosophy revolved around the concept that all strikes in swordsmanship revolve around the technique kiri-oroshi (vertical downward cut). Kendo really began to take shape with the introduction of bamboo swords, called shinai (竹刀), and the set of lightweight wooden armour, called bōgu (防具), by Naganuma Sirōzaemon Kunisato (長沼 四郎左衛門 国郷, 1688–1767), which allowed for the practice of strikes at full speed and power without risk of injury to the competitors.

Today, virtually the entire practice of kendo is governed by the All Japan Kendo Federation, founded in 1951. Competitions are judged by points, with the first competitor to score two points on their opponent declared the winner. One point may be scored with a successful and properly executed strike to any of several targets: a thrust to the throat, or a strike to the top of the head, sides of the head, sides of the body, or forearms. Practitioners also compete in forms (kata) competitions, using either wooden or blunted metal swords, according to a set of forms promulgated by the AJKF.

=== Iaidō ===
Iaidō (居合道:いあいどう), which would be "the way of mental presence and immediate reaction", is nominally the modernization of iaijutsu, but in practice is frequently identical to iaijutsu. The replacement of jutsu (術) with dō (道) is part of the 20th century emphasis upon personal and spiritual development; an evolution that took place in many martial arts. In the case of iaidō, some schools merely changed in name without altering the curriculum, and others embraced the wholesale change from a combat-orientation to spiritual growth. Similar to Kendō, Iaidō is largely practiced under the All Japan Kendo Federation and it's not unusual for a Kendō club to offer Iaidō practice as well.

=== Aikido ===
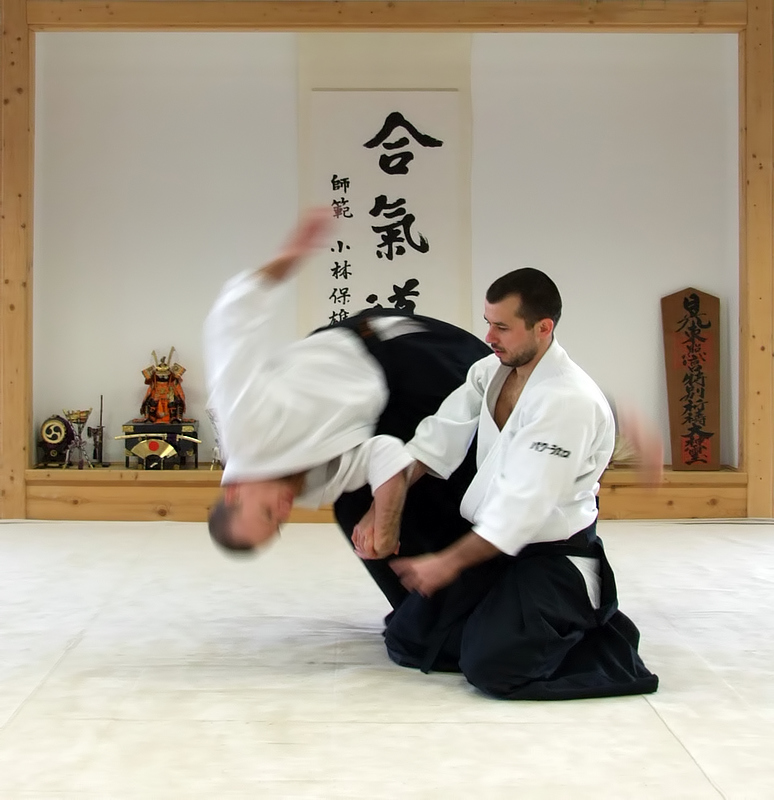
Aikido shihōnage technique

Aikido (合氣道:あいきどう, aikidō) means "the way to harmony with ki". It is a Japanese martial art developed by Morihei Ueshiba (植芝 盛平 Ueshiba Morihei, 1883 – 1969). The art consists of "striking", "throwing" and "joint locking" techniques and is known for its fluidity and blending with an attacker, rather than meeting "force with force". Emphasis is upon joining with the rhythm and intent of the opponent in order to find the optimal position and timing, when the opponent can be led without force. Aikidō is also known for emphasizing the personal development of its students, reflecting the spiritual background of its founder.

Morihei Ueshiba developed aikido mainly from Daitō-ryū aiki-jūjutsu incorporating training movements such as those for the yari (槍; spear), jō (杖; a short quarterstaff), and perhaps also jūken (銃剣; bayonet). Arguably the strongest influence is that of kenjutsu and in many ways, an aikidō practitioner moves as an empty handed swordsman.

=== Kyūdō ===
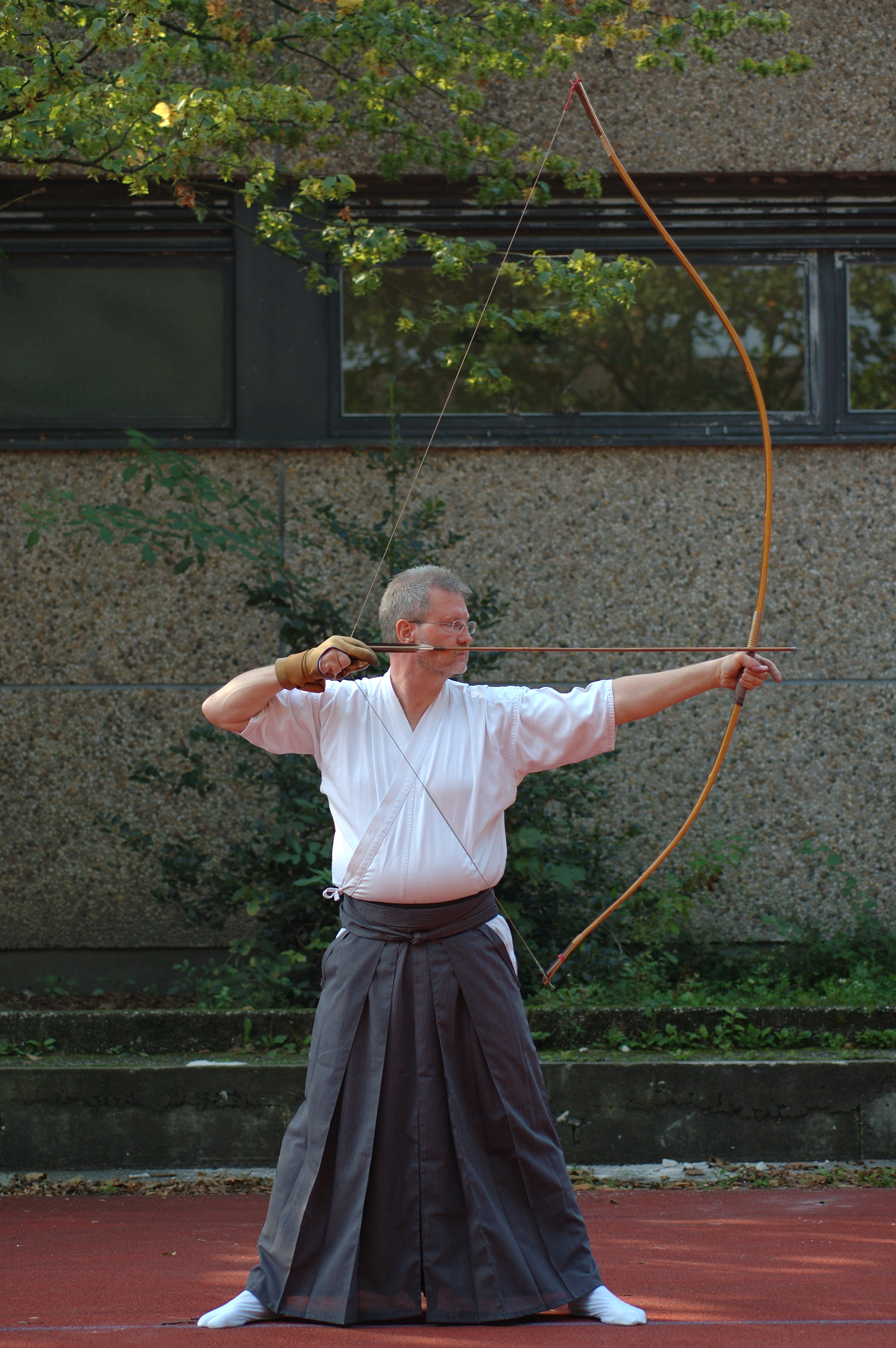
A full draw (kai)

Kyūdō (弓道:きゅうどう), which means "way of the bow", is the modern name for Japanese archery. Originally in Japan, kyujutsu, the "art of the bow", was a discipline of the samurai, the Japanese warrior class. The bow is a long range weapon that allowed a military unit to engage an opposing force while it was still far away. If the archers were mounted on horseback, they could be used to even more devastating effect as a mobile weapons platform. Archers were also used in sieges and sea battles.

However, from the 16th century onward, firearms slowly displaced the bow as the dominant battlefield weapon. As the bow lost its significance as a weapon of war, and under the influence of Buddhism, Shinto, Daoism and Confucianism, Japanese archery evolved into kyudō, the "way of the bow". In some schools kyudō is practiced as a highly refined contemplative practice, while in other schools it is practiced as a sport.

=== Karate ===
Karate (空手, karate) literally means "empty hand". It is also sometimes called "the way of the empty hand" (空手道, karatedō). It was originally called 唐手 ("Chinese hand"), also pronounced 'karate'.

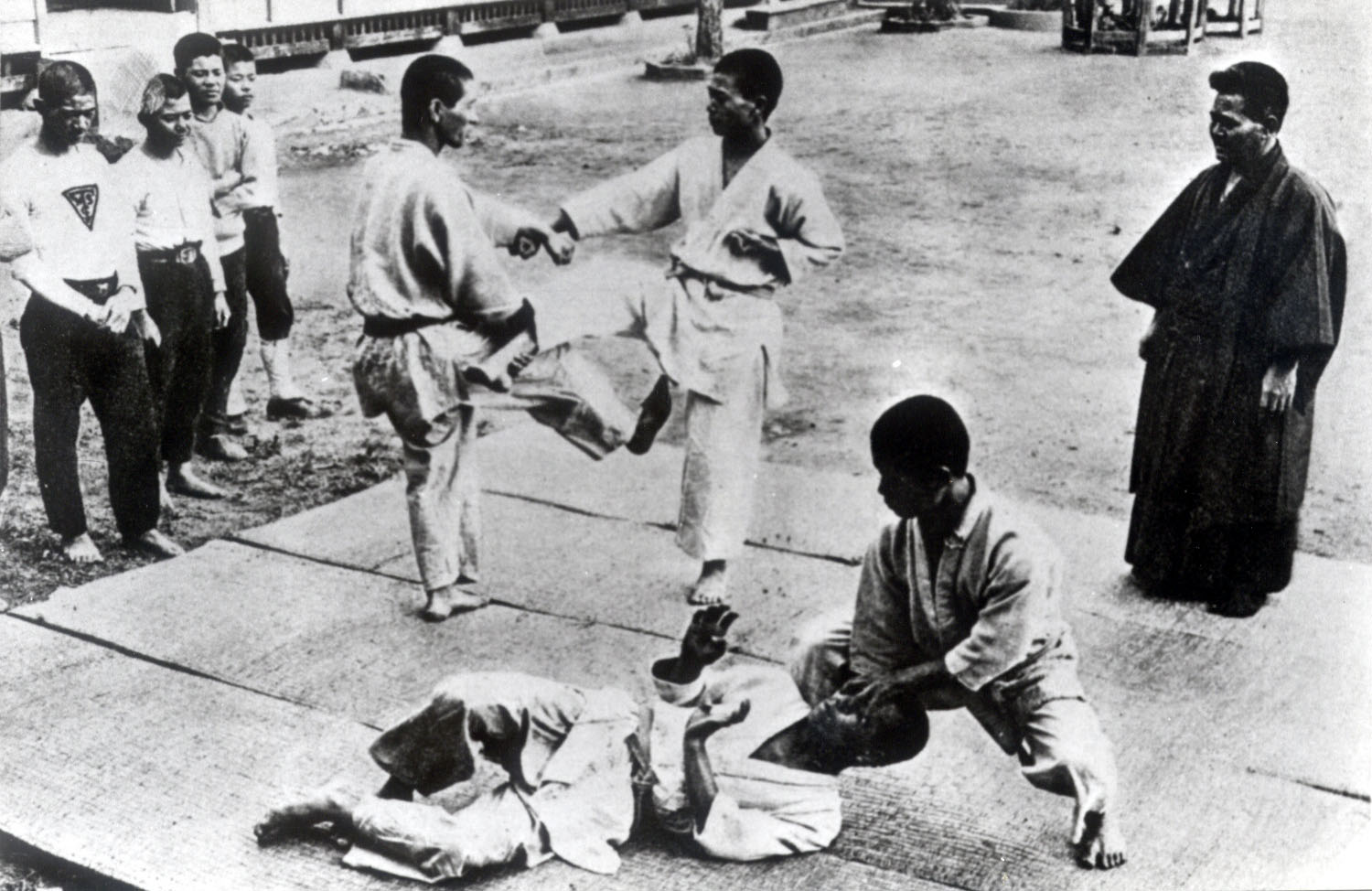
Karate in Naha before the war; before 1946

Karate originated in and, is technically, Okinawan, except for Kyokushin (an amalgamation of parts of Shotokan and Gojoryu), formerly known as the Ryūkyū Kingdom, but now a part of present-day Japan. Karate is a fusion of pre-existing Okinawan martial arts, called "te", and Chinese martial arts. It is an art that has been adopted and developed by practitioners on the Japanese main island of Honshu.

Karate's route to Honshu began with Gichin Funakoshi (船越 義珍 Funakoshi Gichin, 1868–1957), who is called the father of karate, and is the founder of Shotokan karate. Although some Okinawan karate practitioners were already living and teaching in Honshū, Funakoshi gave public demonstrations of karate in Tokyo at a physical education exhibition sponsored by the ministry of education in 1917, and again in 1922. As a result, karate training was subsequently incorporated into Japan's public school system. It was also at this time that the white uniforms and the kyū/dan ranking system (both originally implemented by judo's founder, Kano Jigoro) were adopted.

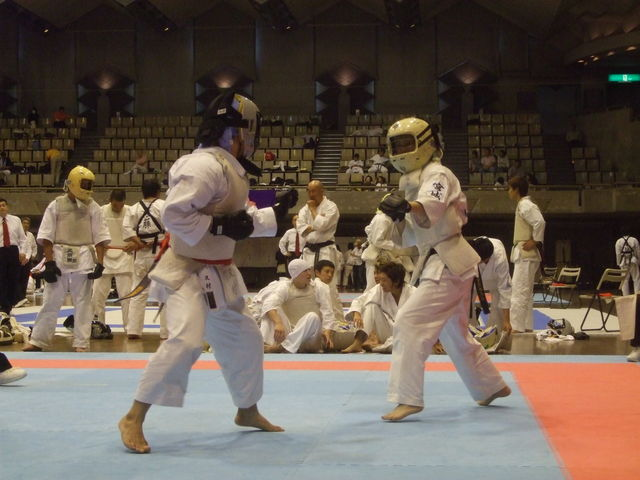
Bōgutsuki, a form of full-contact karate fought with armour, one of the competition formats for kumite

Karate practice is primarily characterized by linear punching and kicking techniques executed from a stable, fixed stance. Many styles of karate practiced today incorporate the forms (kata) originally developed by Funakoshi and his teachers and many different weapons traditionally concealed as farm implements by the peasants of Okinawa. Many karate practitioners also participate in light- and no-contact competitions while some (ex. kyokushin karate) still compete in full-contact competitions with little or no protective gear.

=== Shorinji Kempo ===
Shorinji Kempo (少林寺拳法, shōrinji-kenpō) is a post-World War II system of self-defense and self-improvement training (行: gyo or discipline) known as the modified version of Shaolin Kung Fu. There are two primary technique categories such as gōhō (剛法; strikes, kicks and blocks) and jūhō (柔法; pins, joint locks and dodges). It was established in 1947 by Doshin So (宗 道臣, Sō Dōshin) who had been in Manchuria during World War II and who on returning to his native Japan after World War II saw the need to overcome the devastation and re-build self-confidence of the Japanese people on a massive scale.

Although Shorinji Kempo was originally introduced in Japan in the late 1940s and 1950s through large scale programmes involving employees of major national organizations (e.g. Japan Railways) it subsequently became popular in many other countries. Today, according to the World Shorinji Kempo Organization (WSKO), there are almost 1.5 million practitioners in 33 countries.

=== Sport Chanbara ===
Chanbara Sport or "Spochan" consists of a fight between two participants with equal or different weapons, in a free manner but nevertheless having minimum rules. "Chanbara" is a form of Japanese onomatopoeia which expresses the sound of swords clashing in samurai combat.

European Chanbara Championship was held since 1998. 48th / 6th World Chanbara Championship (Men / Women) was held in 2024. World championship was started in 1970s for men and 2010s for women. The 8th Asian Oceania Sports Chanbara Championship in New Caledonia in 2014.

== Philosophical and strategic concepts ==
=== Aiki ===
The principle of aiki (合気) is particularly difficult to describe or explain. The most simple translation of aiki, as "joining energy", belies its philosophical depth. Generally, it is the principle of matching your opponent in order to defeat him. It is this concept of "matching", or "joining", or even "harmonizing" (all valid interpretations of ai) that contains the complexity. One may "match" the opponent in a clash of force, possibly even resulting in a mutual kill. This is not aiki. Aiki is epitomized by the notion of joining physically and mentally with the opponent for the express purpose of avoiding a direct clash of force. In practice, aiki is achieved by first joining with the motion of the opponent (the physical aspect) as well as the intent (the mental portion), then overcoming the will of the opponent, redirecting their motion and intent.

Historically, this principle was used for destructive purposes; to seize an advantage and kill one's opponent. The modern art of aikido is founded upon the principle that the control of the opponent achieved by the successful application of aiki may be used to defeat one's opponent without harming them.

=== Attitude ===
Kokoro (心:こころ) is a concept that crosses through many martial arts, but has no single discrete meaning. Literally translating as "heart", in context it can also mean "character" or "attitude." Character is a central concept in karate, and in keeping with the dō nature of modern karate, there is a great emphasis on improving oneself. It is often said that the art of karate is for self-defense; not injuring one's opponent is the highest expression of the art. Some popularly repeated quotes implicating this concept include:

The ultimate aim of Karate lies not in victory or defeat, but in the perfection of the character of its participants.

—Gichin Funakoshi

=== Budō ===
A Japanese term for martial art, literally "martial way".

=== Bushidō ===
A code of honor for samurai way of life, in principle similar to chivalry but culturally very different. Literally "the way of the warrior", those dedicated to Bushido have exemplary skill with a sword or bow, and can withstand great pain and discomfort. It emphasizes courage, bravery, and loyalty to their lord (daimyō) above all.

==== Courtesy ====
Shigeru Egami:

Words that I have often heard are that "everything begins with rei and ends with rei". The word itself, however, can be interpreted in several ways; it is the rei of reigi meaning "etiquette, courtesy, politeness" and it is also the rei of keirei, "salutation" or "bow". The meaning of rei is sometimes explained in terms of kata or katachi ("formal exercises" and "form" or "shape"). It is of prime importance not only in karate but in all modern martial arts. For the purpose in modern martial arts, let us understand rei as the ceremonial bow in which courtesy and decorum are manifest. He who would follow the way of karate must be courteous, not only in training but in daily life. While humble and gentle, he should never be servile. His performance of the kata should reflect boldness and confidence. This seemingly paradoxical combination of boldness and gentleness leads ultimately to harmony. It is true, as Master Funakoshi used to say, that the spirit of karate would be lost without courtesy.

=== Kiai ===
A term describing 'fighting spirit'. In practical use this often refers to the scream or shout made during an attack, used for proper breathing as well as debilitating or distracting the enemy.

=== Hard and soft methods ===
The "yin-yang" symbol (Chinese: taijitu)

There are two underlying strategic methodologies to the application of force in Japanese martial arts. One is the hard method (剛法, gōhō), and the other is the soft method (柔法, jūhō). Implicit in these concepts is their separate but equal and interrelated nature, in keeping with their philosophical relationship to the Chinese principles of yin and yang (Jp.: in and yō).

The hard method is characterized by the direct application of counter-force to an opposing force. In practice, this may be a direct attack, consisting of movement directly towards the opponent, coinciding with a strike towards the opponent. A defensive technique where the defender stands their ground to block or parry (directly opposing the attack by stopping it or knocking it aside) would be an example of a hard method of defense. Hard method techniques are generally conceptualized as being linear.

The soft method is characterized by the indirect application of force, which either avoids or redirects the opposing force. For example, receiving an attack by slipping past it, followed by adding force to the attacker's limb for the purpose of unbalancing an attacker is an example of soft method. Soft method techniques are generally conceptualized as being circular.

These definitions give rise to the often illusory distinction between "hard-style" and "soft-style" martial arts. In truth, most styles technically practice both, regardless of their internal nomenclature. Analyzing the difference in accordance with yin and yang principles, philosophers would assert that the absence of either one would render the practitioner's skills unbalanced or deficient, as yin and yang alone are each only half of a whole.

=== Openings, initiative and timing ===
Openings, initiative, and timing are deeply interrelated concepts applicable to self-defense and competitive combat. They each denote different considerations relevant to successfully initiating or countering an attack.

Openings (隙, suki) are the foundation of a successful attack. Although possible to successfully injure an opponent who is ready to receive an attack, it is obviously preferable to attack when and where one's opponent is open. What it means to be open may be as blatant as an opponent becoming tired and lowering their guard (as in physically lowering their hands), or as subtle as a momentary lapse in concentration. In the classical form of combat between masters, each would stand almost entirely motionless until the slightest opening was spotted; only then would they launch as devastating an attack as they could muster, with the goal of incapacitating their opponent with a single blow.

In Japanese martial arts, "initiative" (先, sen) is "the decisive moment when a killing action is initiated." There are two types of initiative in Japanese martial arts, early initiative (先の先, sen no sen), and late initiative (後の先, go no sen). Each type of initiative complements the other, and has different advantages and weaknesses. Early initiative is the taking advantage of an opening in an opponent's guard or concentration (see suki, supra). To fully take the early initiative, the attack launched must be with total commitment and lacking in any hesitation, and virtually ignoring the possibility of a counter-attack by the opponent. Late initiative involves an active attempt to induce an attack by the opponent that will create a weakness in the opponent's defenses, often by faking an opening that is too enticing for the opponent to pass up.

All of the above concepts are integrated into the idea of the combat interval or timing (間合い, maai). Maai is a complex concept, incorporating not just the distance between opponents, but also the time it will take to cross the distance, and angle and rhythm of attack. It is specifically the exact "position" from which one opponent can strike the other, after factoring in the above elements. For example, a faster opponent's maai is farther away than a slower opponent. It is ideal for one opponent to maintain maai while preventing the other from doing so.

The Three Attacks

- Go no sen: meaning "late attack" involves a defensive or counter movement in response to an attack.
- Sen no sen: a defensive initiative launched simultaneously with the attack of the opponent.
- Sensen no sen: an initiative launched in anticipation of an attack where the opponent is fully committed to their attack and thus psychologically beyond the point of no return.

=== Shuhari ===
The principle of Shuhari describes the three stages of learning.

== Pedagogy ==
=== Schools ===
Literally meaning "flow" in Japanese, a ryū is a particular school of an art.

=== Instructors ===
Sensei (先生) is the title used for a teacher, in a similar manner to a college 'Professor' in the United States. Sōke (宗家:そうけ) translates as "headmaster" meaning the head of a ryu.

=== Seniors and juniors ===
The relationship between senior students (先輩, senpai) and junior students (後輩, kōhai) is one with its origins not in martial arts, but rather in Japanese and Asian culture generally. It underlies Japanese interpersonal relationships in many contexts, such as business, school, and sports. It has become part of the teaching process in Japanese martial arts schools. A senior student is senior to all students who either began training after him or her, or who they outrank. The role of the senior student is crucial to the indoctrination of the junior students to etiquette, work ethic, and other virtues important to the school. The junior student is expected to treat their seniors with respect, and plays an important role in giving the senior students the opportunity to learn leadership skills. Senior students may or may not teach formal classes, but in every respect their role is as a teacher to the junior students, by example and by providing encouragement.

=== Ranking systems ===
There are ultimately two ranking systems in the Japanese martial arts, although some schools have been known to blend these two together. The older system, usual prior to 1868, was based a series of licenses or menkyo. There were generally very few levels culminating in the license of total transmission (menkyo kaiden; 免許皆伝).

In the modern system, first introduced in the martial arts through judo, students progress by promotion through a series of grades (kyū), followed by a series of degrees (dan), pursuant to formal testing procedures. Some arts use only white and black belts to distinguish between levels, while others use a progression of colored belts for kyū levels.

=== Forms ===
It has often been said that forms (kata) are the backbone of the martial arts. Nevertheless, different schools and styles put a varying amount of emphasis upon their practice.

== See also ==
- Chanbara
- List of Japanese martial arts
- Okinawan martial arts

== Sources ==
- Hall, David A. Encyclopedia of Japanese Martial Arts. Kodansha USA, 2012. ISBN 978-1568364100.
