= History of Shintō Musō-ryū =

Shintō Musō-ryū, or Shindō Musō-ryū (神道夢想流) is a traditional (ko-ryū) school of the Japanese martial art of jōjutsu, the art of handling the Japanese short staff (jō). The art was created with the purpose of defeating a swordsman in combat using the jō, with an emphasis on proper distance, timing and concentration. Additionally, a variety of other weapons are also taught.

The art was founded by the samurai Musō Gonnosuke Katsuyoshi (夢想 權之助 勝吉, fl. c. 1605, dates of birth and death unknown) in the early Edo period (1603–1868) and, according to legend, first put to use in a duel with Miyamoto Musashi (宮本 武蔵, 1584–1645). The original art created by Musō Gonnosuke has evolved and been added upon ever since its inception and up to modern times. The art was successfully brought outside of its original domain in Fukuoka and outside Japan itself in the 19th and 20th century. The spreading of Shintō Musō-ryū beyond Japan was largely the effort of Takaji Shimizu (Shimizu Takaji, 1896–1978), considered the 25th headmaster. With the assistance of his own students and the cooperation of the kendo community, Shimizu spread Shintō Musō-ryū worldwide.

== Timeline of the Shintō Musō-ryū ==
=== Musō Gonnosuke - Founder ===
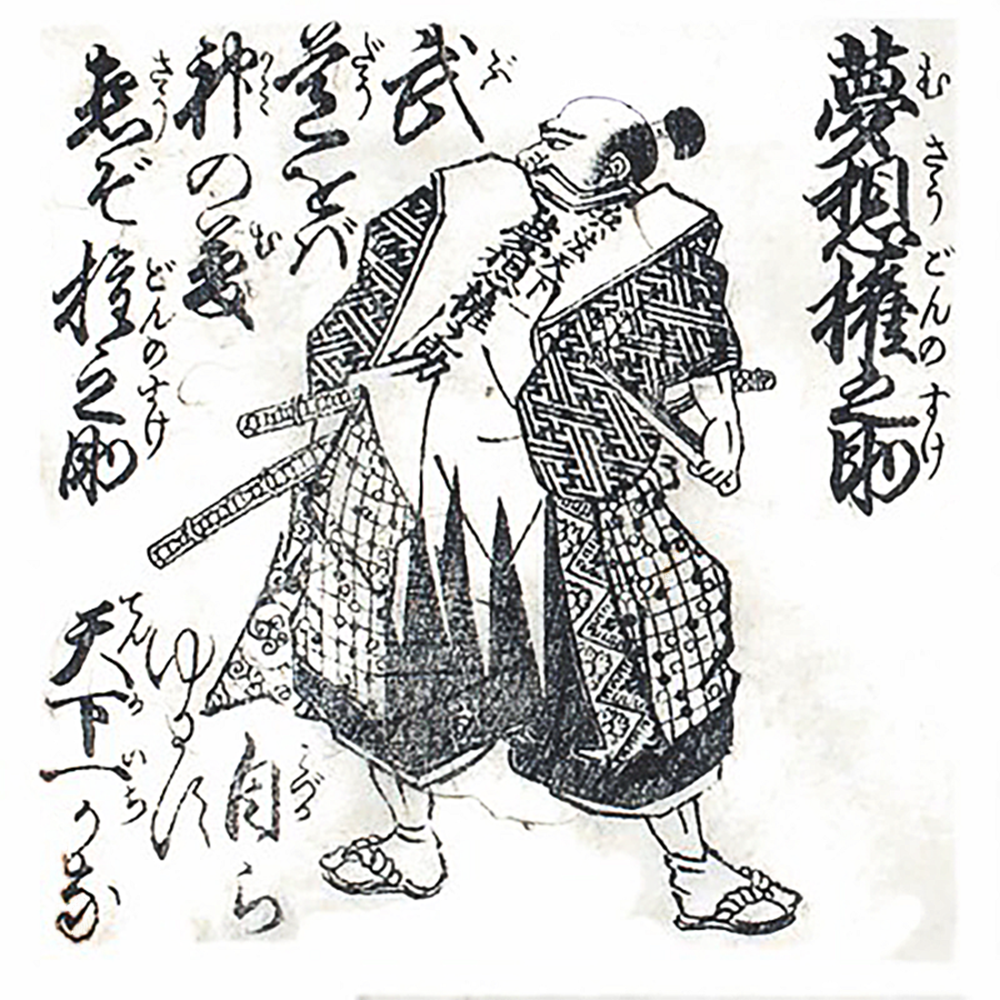
Musō Gonnosuke Katsuyoshi, founder of Shintō Musō-ryū (Image from the Buko Hyakunin Isshu).

Japan's Warring States period (1467–1615), which had scarred Japan for almost 150 years, came to an end with the establishment of the authoritarian Tokugawa shogunate. This in turn ushered in an era of peace that would last for over 260 years and ended with the overthrow of the shogunate in 1868. The relatively peaceful Edo period took away the means of the samurai to fully develop and test their skills in actual battlefield combat. The role of the samurai would eventually change from being warriors, constantly fighting battles for their liege lord (daimyō), into the role of providing internal security with increasingly more bureaucratic duties. Instead of fighting the frequent wars and battles of the old days, with the exception of the siege of Osaka in 1615 and the Shimabara Rebellion in 1637, many samurai resorted to duelling other samurai with others going on the road as a wandering swordsman to test their skills against other swordsmen such as bandits and rōnin, and some would train in far away schools (ryū) to hone their skill.

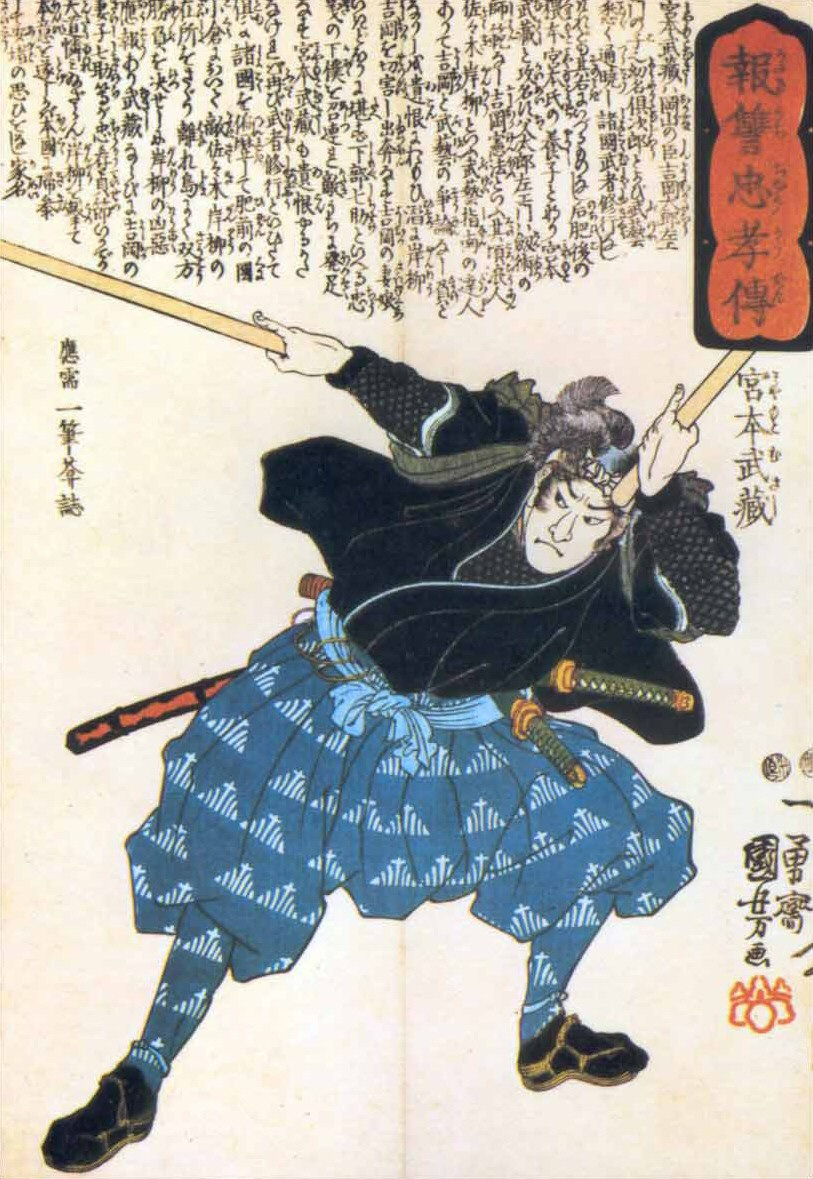
Miyamoto Musashi wielding two wooden swords. The legend states that Musō Gonnosuke found a way to break Musashi's two-sword style of combat and defeat him.

One of the men who went on a warrior's pilgrimage (musha shugyō) was Musō Gonnosuke, a samurai with considerable martial arts experience. Gonnosuke used his training in the arts of the sword (kenjutsu), glaive (naginatajutsu), spear (sōjutsu), and staff (bōjutsu), which he acquired from his studies in Tenshin Shōden Katori Shintō-ryū and Kashima Jikishinkage-ryū, to develop a new way of handling the jō in combat. Gonnosuke was said to have fully mastered the secret form called The Sword of One Cut (Ichi no Tachi), a form that was developed by the founder of the Kashima Shinto-ryū and later spread to other Kashima schools such as Kashima Jikishinkage-ryū and Kashima Shin-ryū. His experiences, which would climax in his duels with the famous swordsman Miyamoto Musashi, led him to create a set of techniques for the jō and establish a new school which he named Shintō Musō-ryū. The techniques were intended to be used against an opponent armed with either one or two swords. Among the advantages of the jō is its superior length when matched against a sword. The extra length enables the wielder to keep the swordsman at a disadvantage and this is frequently applied in SMR.

The legend states that Musō Gonnosuke fought two duels with Miyamoto Musashi and was defeated in the first but victorious in the second, using his newly developed jōjutsu techniques to either defeat Musashi or force the duel into a draw. The first duel is described in the annals known as Niten Ki, which is a list of anecdotes told about Musashi and compiled by Musashi's followers after his death. The Niten Ki describes the first duel to have taken place c. 1610. One of several legends states that after his defeat Gonnosuke withdrew to the Homan-zan mountain in the northern part of Kyūshū, spent his days meditating and training, and underwent austere religious rituals. While resting near a fire in a certain temple, Gonnosuke heard a voice say "Be mindful of the strategy 'the moon reflected in the water' (suigetsu)". The tradition states that was his inspiration to develop his new techniques and to fight Musashi a second time.

After the creation of his jō techniques and his establishment as a skilled jōjutsu practitioner he was invited by the Kuroda clan of northern Kyūshū (in present-day Fukuoka Prefecture) to teach his jōjutsu to their warriors. Gonnosuke accepted the invitation and settled there.

=== The secret art of the Kuroda clan (1614–1871) ===
After Gonnosuke's death, his jōjutsu would become a closely guarded secret (oteme-waza) of the Kuroda clan, and forbidden to be taught anywhere but within its domain and only to specially selected people within the warrior-class. This was not an unusual practice in the Edo period. For example, in the 17th century, the Kage-ryū school of swordsmanship (battōjutsu), used swords which were longer than the length legally permitted by the Tokugawa shogunate. Since these longer swords were forbidden by the government, Kage-ryū went "underground", but was kept active in strict secrecy until the Meiji Restoration hundreds of years later.

The main students of Gonnosuke's art were the men charged with policing the Kuroda clan's domain (Kuroda-han). During this period other schools (ryū) were created and taught in the Kuroda-han and in the various branches of the Shintō Musō-ryū system. During this period, two newly created schools which included the art of the police baton (jūtte), (among other weapons) and the art of restraining a man with rope (hojōjutsu), were taught within the branches of the Shintō Musō-ryū as a complement to the arresting (torite)-arts.

After Gonnosukes death the art was mainly transmitted by the "Dangyō-shiyaku" (men's arts instructor), though not all branches of the Kuroda staff-traditions used the title of Dangyō-shiyaku. The Dangyō-instructor position was, unlike the swordsmanship instructor (kagyō) a non-hereditary position within the hierarchy of the Samurai. The Dangyō-instructor in the Kuroda-domain was the charged with teaching the lower ranking warriors (ashigaru) in the arts of the staff (jō), capturing/seizing/escaping (torite), gunnery (hōjutsu) and rope (nawa) among other arts. The position of Dangyō-instructor lasted until the abolishment of the Samurai and the feudal system in the 1860s-1870s.

Over time there would arise seven different lineages from the main Shintō Musō-ryū system. These are collectively known as "The Staff of Kuroda" (Kuroda no jō). Of these seven branches of Gonnosuke's jōjutsu, only two would survive the ending of Japan's feudal system in 1867 and the resulting socio-economic modernization, to be informally merged into a single line that is today the modern "Way of the Gods School of Musō" (神道夢想流, Shintō Musō-ryū).

The first split in the SMR occurred after the death of the fourth headmaster Higuchi Han'emon. The split was the result of one of his licensed (menkyo kaiden) students, Harada Heizo Nobusada, breaking away to establish the "New Just School of Musō" (新とう夢想流, Shintō Musō-ryū) (later informally known as Kansai-ryū), while another licensed student of Higuchi Han'emon continued the original "True Path" line (later known as Moriki-ryū).

For several years Gonnosukes art was passed on by these two lines. The "New Just" line continued until after the death of its headmaster Nagatomi Koshiro Hisatomo in 1772. Afterwards, the "New Just" line branched off into two separate traditions. The primary reason for this branching, though indirectly, was the result of a restructuring of the living and training quarters of the warriors at the Chikuzen castle. The low-ranking foot soldiers (ashigaru) and the junior officers (kashi) were relocated to two separate areas of Fukuoka, partially due to the difference in the social status of the two groups. Each group would create new centres of training in their respective areas. This led to the establishment of two new branches from the "New Just"-line of Jōjutsu, each under their own respective head instructor. These new lines were named haruyoshi, led by Ono Kyusaku, and the other jigyo, led by Komori Seibei, respectively. The two branches were named after the two respective areas of the castle in which they trained.

These new branches, jigyo and haruyoshi, were a reality by the early 19th century, but even though separate, all three lines appear to have been very similar in terms of techniques. This was demonstrated when the jigyo Branch was broken with the death of its head instructor Fujimoto Heikichi in 1815. Because of this, the jigyo found itself without a fully licensed headmaster, and without a successor from within its own organisation the line would have died out. However, Hatae Kyuhei, who held a full license in the haruyoshi branch, would eventually revive the jigyo branch and allow it to continue into the Meiji period (1868–1912).

Meanwhile, the "True Path" had also fallen onto hard times as the tradition was broken with the death of Inoue Ryosuke in 1831. The similarities between the various "Staff of Kuroda"-traditions were again made clear when Hatae Kyuhei (who was an exponent of the haruyoshi-branch and had also helped revive the jigyo branch of the "New Just line") revived the "True Path". The "True Path" would, however, become extinct in the Bakumatsu era (1850–1867). It was not until 1871 that the ban on teaching outside the Kuroda clan was lifted.

=== Shiraishi Hanjiro and the Post-Kuroda-period (1871–1927) ===
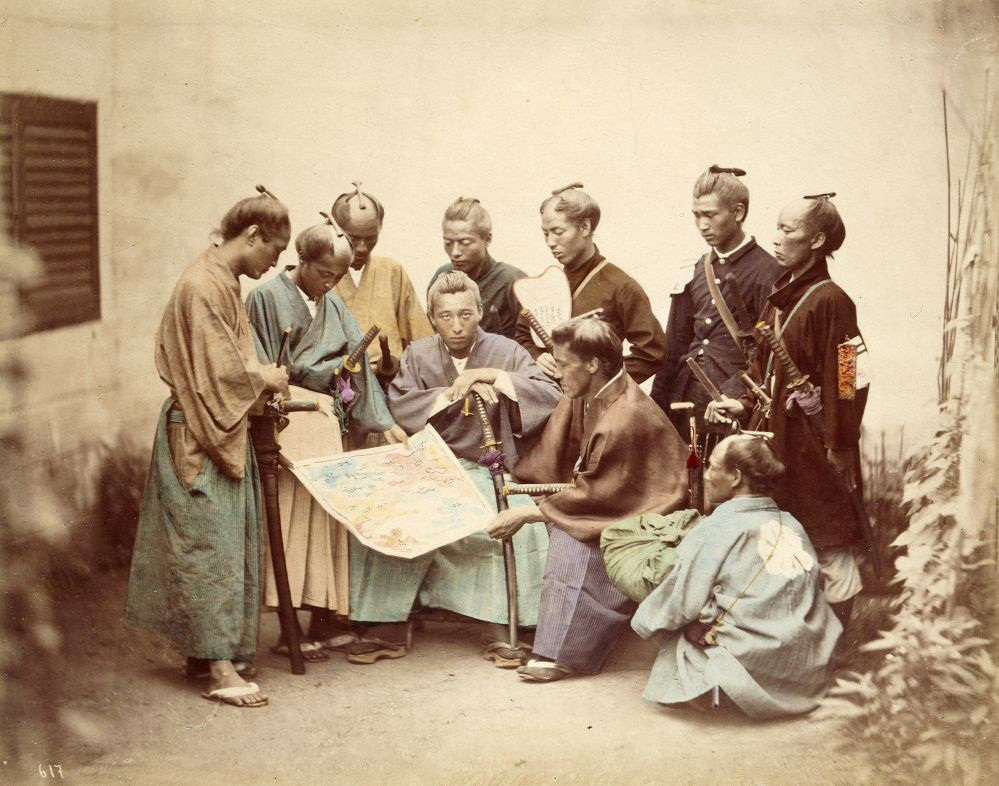
Samurai of the Chōshū clan, during the Boshin War period 1868 - These samurai fought to restore the Emperor to power and preserve the way of the Samurai. This war would ironically result in the later dissolution of the Samurai class in 1877

With the abolishment of the shogunate in 1868 and easing of bureaucratic restrictions, Shintō Musō-ryū (and all the other martial arts of the land) was allowed to be taught outside the traditional family lands. Despite this new-found freedom, however, it meant that the numerous economical benefits and patronage, which was a part of the traditional clan system, were abolished along with it. Because of this the numerous menkyo holders of SMR who had depended on the old system for financial support had no choice but to adapt themselves to this new Japan. Many of them left the traditional clan holdings, where their ancestors had lived for centuries, and made new lives and livelihoods for themselves. The final abolishment of the warrior-caste and the feudal-system also led to a rapid modernisation of Japan. During this era many of the old bushi (Samurai warriors of all ranks) had no choice but to abandon the old (and considered by most of the Japanese population of the time to be all but obsolete) martial arts altogether. Throughout Japan most of the surviving traditions were kept alive, if only barely, by the former samurai and other enthusiastic individuals, the former which now had to find a new place (and a new source of income) in the new Japan which frowned upon the old samurai way. Some of the old ryū, who were not as dependent on old samurai government sponsorship as others, fared better than others in the transition from samurai to the Western-style government.

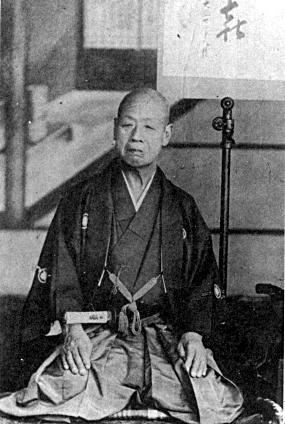
Shiraishii Hanjiro (1842–1927) – Shintō Musō-ryū's 24th unofficial headmaster

During this transition period and beyond, various groups of former Kuroda bushi held sporadic meetings and training sessions in memory of the now bygone era. The old bushi present at these sessions included Uchida Ryogoro, Shiraishi Hanjiro and many of the former Dangyo (instructors) of the Kuroda clan. Due to newfound cooperation between the surviving SMR-lineages there were several joint-licenses of the Haruyoshi and Jigyo-branches of SMR issued in the late 19th century. Shiraishi Hanjiro was one of those men who received a full Menkyo Kaiden license. By the end of the Meiji era, (1912), only Shiraishi was still active as a fully qualified exponent and dedicated teacher of the last two remaining Kuroda Jō lineages.

Shiraishi Hanjiro was born in 1842 and was a lower class samurai. As a bushi, (collective name for all samurai warrior of all ranks), he learned jojutsu, kenjutsu and other warrior-arts as was expected of a samurai. After the fall of the samurai government, Shiraishi did his best to sustain the jojutsu tradition he had learned. He helped organise the post-samurai meetings and training-sessions of old Kuroda-warriors and would receive his full license in SMR-jojutsu during one of these sessions. Shiraishi eventually opened up a dojo in Fukuoka City and taught the art there. Sometime in the late 19th century, Shiraishi started learning the art of Kusarigama (chain and sickle weapon) as taught by the Isshin-ryū tradition. He would eventually receive a Menkyo Kaiden in this system and started teaching kusarigamajutsu alongside jojutsu in his Fukuoka dojo. Shiraishi would award Menkyo Kaiden to several of his jojutsu students who carried on the tradition as a side-art to SMR-jojutsu.

Shiraishi's dojo was located in then Hakata City. In 1876, Hakata City and nearby Fukuoka city was merged into a new city named Dai-Iti-Dai-ku (第一大区) and in 1878 further renamed as Fukuoka-ku (福岡区) by the Fukuoka Prefectural government. Shiraishi would teach Shintō Musō-ryū there until his death in 1927. Shiraishis senior, Uchida Ryogoro, decided to travel to Tokyo and teach and expand the art there while Shiraishi stayed in the designated Shintō Musō-ryū headquarters in Fukuoka.

In the early 20th century Uchida Ryogoro arrived in Tokyo and set up shop, teaching jōjutsu to high-rankers in the Japanese society at the time. His students included Nakayama Hakudo (1873–1958), founder of Musō Shinden-ryū, and Komita Takayoshi, founder of the Dai Nippon Butoku Kai ("Great Japan Budō Preservation Society"). It was during this time that Jigoro Kano was first invited to Fukuoka to observe SMR which would herald the cooperation between the two arts in Tokyo. Uchida Ryogoro also taught at the Naval Officers Club and later at the Shiba Kōen park. Ryogoro's son, Uchida Ryōhei, joined him in Tokyo and studied under his father there and was instrumental in developing his father's Tanjōjutsu art into a working set of techniques. Uchida Ryogoro died in 1921. Uchidas efforts in Tokyo greatly assisted in establishing a connection with the various martial arts communities already based in Tokyo and would help pave the way to Shimizu Takajis own efforts at popularizing SMR and establishing a new SMR presence.

=== The Shimizu Takaji era (1927–1978) ===
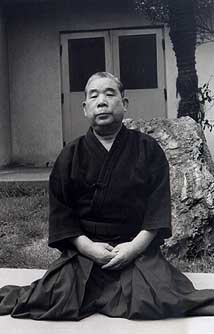
Shimizu Takaji (1896–1978) – Shintō Musō-ryū's 25th unofficial headmaster and the arts leading personality during the 20th century

Shimizu Takaji was born in 1897 and came from humble origins, his family descending from a line of village headmen and minor officials. In the aftermath of the abolishment of the samurai caste, Shimizu's father would manage a small general store while Shimizu, after graduating from elementary school, took employment in a small factory at Hakata, where the Shiraishi Dojo operated. Shimizu started his training at the age of 17 (1914) under Shiraishi himself and quickly rose in the ranks, receiving the Mokuroku scroll in 1918 and the license of full transmission (Menkyo kaiden) in 1920 at the age of 23. Of the many students of Shiraishi there were three who became prominent in the aftermath of Shiraishi's death. Shimizu Takaji (1898–1978), Takayama Kiroku (1893–1938) and Otofuji Ichizo (1899–1998).

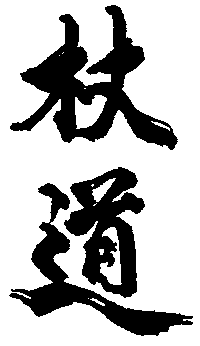
Jōdo in Kanji

In the early 1920s Jigorō Kanō, the founder of judo, witnessed a demonstration of SMR and made an invitation to Shiraishi come to Tokyo and teach SMR there. Due to his advanced age Shiraishi declined to come in person and sent his student Shimizu Takaji instead. Shimizu arrived in Tokyo in 1927. After a further demonstration of SMR-Jō in front of the Tokyo Police Force technical commission, a decision was made to incorporate elements of SMR-Jō for police-use. The new system was named keijo-jutsu and intended for use with the special police unit Tokubetsu Keisatsutai. Shimizu started training the new unit in 1931. Now a permanent Tokyo-resident, Shimizu opened up his own dojo, the Mumon (No Gate) Dojo.

In 1929 Takayama Kiroku, with financial aid from the family of the late Shiraishi Hanjiro, opened a dojo in Fukuoka and was named Shihan with Shimizu named fuku-shihan or "assistant master". Shimizu by this time, however, was on his way to Tokyo in order to teach Jōdo. Takayama died in 1938 and Otofuji Ichizo took over as the new master of the dojo and of the Fukuoka-jō, a responsibility he held until his death in 1998.

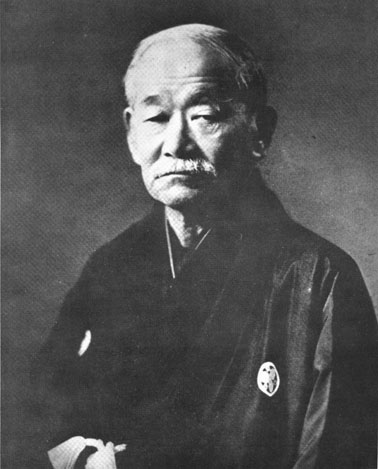
Jigorō Kanō – The founder of Judo and a patron of martial arts in general – Invited Shintō Musō-ryū practitioners to come to Tokyo and teach the art there

During the 1930s in Tokyo, Shimizu felt that the traditional way of teaching Jo was not suited for this new (and more numerous) generation of students. He realised that a better method of teaching Jo was required in order to properly teach ever increasing number of new students who had no previous experience of Martial Arts. He took inspiration from Jigoro Kanos new Judo organisation and training-methods in order to, among other things, develop the twelve basic techniques kihon which would make SMR more appealing and approachable to the beginner-student. These twelve basic techniques are still taught in most mainstream dojos today. In 1940 Shimizu became the head of the Dai Nihon Jōdokai (Greater Japan Jōdo Association) and he decided to rename the art from Jōjutsu to Jōdo in keeping with the trend of the time.

With the end of World War II in 1945, many martial arts were banned by the new government for fear that they might be used by ultra-nationalistic groups as a way to cause civil unrest. The police-jō taught by Shimizu to the Tokyo Police force was one of the few exceptions and many other martial arts practitioners from before the war went to Shimizus dojo in Tokyo for training. The police-jo were further developed in the 1960s when it was adapted for use in crowd-control with the Tokyo Riot police.

Shimizu, as had Shiraishi before him, has both been described as an SMR Headmaster due to their initiative and major contributions to SMR though neither Shiraishi or Shimizu received official appointment to such a position. Shimizu would complete Shintō Musō-ryū's transition from a localized bugei ryu to a national martial art and become the art's greatest popularizer through his acceptance of foreign students and the establishment of Jōdo-organisations.

=== Post-Shimizu period 1978 to the present ===
After Shimizu's death, Kaminoda Tsunemori, one of Shimizu's top-students and Menkyo Kaiden of Shintō Musō-ryū, took over as head-instructor of the Zoshokan Temple Dojo which would also become the new headquarters of the latters Nihon Jōdokai organisation.

== Shintō Musō-ryū lineage chart ==
From the foundation of the art in the early 17th century to the start of the Meiji-era there has been a total of seven traditions of Kuroda no Jô within the Kuroda domain including two branches. Five of these used the name "Shintō Musō-ryū", but with different interpretations of Shintō. The other two traditions, which are not covered in the below chart, were "Ten'ami-ryū Heijo" and the "Shin Chigiriki-ryū".

The original tradition as founded by Gonnosuke was named Shintō Musō-ryū, with Shintō interpreted as "True Path" (真道). The first split resulted in another tradition being founded, also with the name "Shintō Musō-ryū" but with Shintō being interpreted as "New Just" (新當).

At a later point in history the originator of the lineage in the official documents of the ryū (densho) was changed from Matsumoto Bizen-no-Kami Naokatsu (founder of Kashima Jikishinkage-ryū and Kashima Shinryū) to the founder of Tenshin Shōden Katori Shintō-ryū Iizasa Ienao, a school in which Musō Gonnosuke had trained in. The actual founder of the Jōjutsu-tradition was Musō Gonnosuke.

The modern-day tradition took up the "Way of the gods" (神道) interpretation of Shinto ( Musō-ryū) in the late 1800s and has kept it since.

Shintō Musō-ryū tradition - Founded early 1600s

(1). Iizasa Yamashiro-no-kami (1387–1488) Founder of Katori Shintō-ryū.
(2). Matsumoto Bizen-no-kami Masanobu (1467–1524) Founder of Kashima Jikishinkage-ryū and Kashima Shinryū

1. Musō Gonnosuke Katsuyoshi - Traditional founder of "True Path" 真道 (Shintō) Musō-ryū.
2. Okubi Mogozaemon (also known as Kokubi Magozaemon Yoshishige)
3. Matsuzaki Kin'emon - Credited with creating two new separate arts which are taught alongside SMR - Also a practitioner of Ittō-ryū.
4. Higuchi Han'emon - The last Headmaster of a unified SMR - Separate lineages of Gonnosukes Jō-art appear, headed by their own headmasters.

The "New Just" 新當 (Shintō) Musō-ryū tradition	The "True Path" 真道 (Shintō ) Musō-ryū tradition- Later known as Moroki-ryū
5.Harada Heizo (died 1733) - Establishes the "New Just" 新當 (Shintō ) Musō-ryū tradition. (informally known during this period as "Kansai-ryū" which is a reference to a title of Harada Heizo.) 6.Hara Shiemon (died 1754) 7.Nagatomi Koshiro (1717–1772), last Headmaster of "The New Just" - On his death, The "New Just" 新當 (Shintō) Musō-ryū branches of into two new lines headed by students of the last "New Just" headmaster.	5. Yokota Hanzaburo - Continues the original "True Path" 真道(Shintō) Musō-ryū.; 6. Moriki Keichi (died 1784) - Establishes Moriki-branch (Moroki-ryū).; 7.Inoue Ryosuke (died 1821) - Line broken with his death.

Haruyoshi branch

- 8. Ono Kyusaku (died 1807) - Establishes Haruyoshi branch of "New Just" 新當 (Shintō) Musō-ryū around 1796.
- 9. Nagatomi Jinzo (died 1822)
- 10. Hirano Kichizo (died 1871)
- 11. Yoshikawa Wataru
- 12. Hirano Saburo, (1837–1916) - Last Headmaster of the Haruyoshi - Tradition merged with the "Jigyo" tradition to form the "Way of the gods" 神道 (Shintō) Musō-ryū later under Shiraishi Hanjiro.

Jigyo branch

- 8. Komori Seibei - Establishes Jigyo branch of "New Just" 新當 (Shintō) Musō-ryū around 1796.
- 9. Fujimoto Heikichi (died 1815) - Line broken with his death in 1815.
- 10. Hatae Kyuhei (died 1829) - Originally from the Haruyoshi-tradition - Reestablishes Jigyo-branch.
- 11. Yoshimura Hanjiro - Last Headmaster of "Jigyo" - Tradition merged with the "Haruyoshi" tradition to form the "Way of the gods" 神道 (Shintō) Musō-ryū later under Shiraishi Hanjiro.

The "True Path" 真道 (Shintō) Musō-ryū tradition- Later known as Moroki-ryū

8.Hatae Kyuhei - Line reestablished.
9.Yamazaki Koji - Last Headmaster of "True Path" 真道 (Shintō) Musō-ryū. Named "Shujo-ryū" by its last Headmaster - Line broken in the Bakumatsu era, (1850–1867), never reestablished.

"Way of the gods" 神道 (Shintō) Musō-ryū - late 19th century to present time

Jigyo and Haruyoshi branches joined into a single ryū.

24. Shiraishi Hanjiro (1842–1927) - Was originally a lower class warrior and exponent of both the "Haruyoshi" and "Jigyo" traditions. After the fall of the Tokugawa and the Feudal-system, Shiraishi is issued a joint-license of the largest two surviving branches of the Kuroda-jō, the "Haruyoshi" and "Jigyo"-branch. The result of the merge is a new single tradition that was named "Way of the Gods" 神道 (Shintō) Musō-ryū, with Shiraishi being the sole leader by the early 1900s. Shiraishi was considered the arts 24th headmaster.
25. Shimzu Takaji (1896–1978) - A student of Shiraishi Hanjiro. Is considered by some to be the 25th headmaster of Shintō Musō-ryū, but was never officially appointed by Shiraishi. Shimizu died in 1978 without naming a successor.
26. A 26th headmaster has never been formally appointed by a unified SMR-community.

Notes

- Menkyo=A holder of a license of total transmission with complete authority to teach and/or modify the existing system.
- Kanji and names:
  - Original name: 真道, (interpreted as "True Path" pronounced "Shinto"), Muso-ryū 夢想流.
  - Branch schools: 新當, (interpreted as "New Just", pronounced "Shinto"), Muso-ryū 夢想流.
  - Modern-day tradition: 神道, (interpreted as "Way of the Gods" pronounced "Shinto"), Muso-ryū 夢想流.

== Past and modern organisations ==
After the death of Shimizu Takaji in 1978, SMR in Tokyo was left without a clear leader or appointed successor. This led to a splintering of the SMR dojos in Japan, and eventually all over the world. With no single organisation or individual with complete authority over SMR as a whole, several of the various fully licensed (menkyo) SMR-practitioners established their own organisations both in the West and in Japan.

From the end of the Samurai reign in 1877 to the early 20th century, SMR was still largely confined, (though slowly spreading), to Fukuoka city on the southern Japanese island of Kyushu where the art first was created and thrived. The main proponent of SMR in Fukuoka during this time was Shiraishi Hanjiro, a former Kuroda-clan warrior (ashigaru), who had trained in and received a joint-license from the two largest surviving jo-branches of SMR. Among Shiraishis top students were Shimizu Takaji, Otofuji Ichizô and Takayama Kiroku, Takayama being the senior. After receiving an invitation from the Tokyo martial arts scene to perform a demonstration of SMR, Shimizu and Takayama established a Tokyo SMR-group which held a close working relationship with martial arts supporters such as Jigoro Kano, the founder of Judo. Shiraishi died in 1927 and there now existed two main lines (or branches) of SMR. The oldest of the two was found in Fukuoka, now under the leadership of Otofuji with the one in Tokyo under Shimizu. Takayama, the senior of the three students of Shiraishi, died in the 1930s leaving Shimizu with a position of great influence in the SMR-scene as the senior-most student of Shiriashi, (Otofuji being his junior), that would last up to his death in 1978. Although Otofuji was one of Shiraishis top-students he was unable to assume the role that Shimizu had held in Tokyo. By the 1970s the Tokyo and Fukuoka SMR-communities had fully developed into separate branches with their own leaders. Unlike Otofuji, Shimizu was a senior of both the Fukuoka and Tokyo SMR, with great knowledge and influence over both. With Shimizus death Otofuji were not in a strong enough position to claim complete authority over the SMR-community and no sort of agreement could be made over who should formally succeed Shimizu. The position of Headmaster of the SMR-community as a whole could not be filled. Otofuji would remain the leader of Kyushu SMR until his death in 1998.

From these two lineages, the Fukuoka and the Tokyo, there stems today several SMR-based organisations all over the world. One of the largest is the All-Japan Jodo Federation (ZNJR), established in the 1960s as a branch of the All-Japan Kendo Federation (ZNKR). The ZNJR was established to further promote Jo through the teaching of ZNKR Jodo, also called Seitei Jodo. Seitei Jodo remains the most widespread form of Jo in the world today.

=== International Jodo Federation ===
One of the first worldwide organisations was the "International Jôdô Federation" (IJF), founded by martial artist Donald "Donn" Draeger (1922–1982) and Shimizu Takaji in the 1970s with the aim of spreading SMR beyond the Japanese boundaries. Donn Draeger was a US Captain of the United States Marine Corps who had trained in the martial arts since boyhood, first in his native country then during the 1950s and onward in Japan. Donn Draeger was the first foreign student of Jodo and was also the first to train in the older Katori Shinto-ryū tradition. The IJF held a close cooperation with several high-ranking SMR-practitioners in the west, mainly from United States, Australia and Europe.

In Europe the first organisation dedicated to the promotion and teaching of the SMR tradition appeared in the late 1970s. starting with a small group based in Switzerland headed by Pascal Krieger. Krieger started training Jodo under Shimizu Takaji in the late 1960s and introduced the tradition to his native country in the early 1970s. As the group in Switzerland slowly grew so did the number of members from the other European countries including Germany and France. In November 1979 "Helvetic Jôdô Association" was created with its headquarters in Geneva, and many new students started to arrive regularly to Geneve for training. The new organisation quickly grew beyond its boundaries and taking on a multi-border role with many of the qualified teachers returning to their homecountries and establishing new SMR-groups. In 1983 the first steps towards a European Jôdô Federation was taken by Krieger with the aim of supporting and developing the SMR-groups all over Europe. The restructuring of the European SMR-groups and slow buildup of an administration would take 7 years and in 1990 the organisation was officially recognised.

== Footnotes ==
- ^a The names Shinto and Shindo, as used in Shintō Musō-ryū, are both equally correct. Different SMR-groups use the name Shinto or Shindo depending on their own tradition, no sort of consensus has been made as to which name should be used.
- ^b Kage-ryū Battojutsu did survive the Meiji-restoration and is still active today.
- ^c A more modern example of martial arts going underground and being secretly taught can be found in the post-World War II ban on Japanese martial arts by the United States during its occupation. Shintō Musō-ryū Jōdo, like many other ryu such as Katori Shinto-ryu, was temporary banned and forbidden to be taught. The occupation forces were weary of the nationalistic overtunes of some of these ryu and feared it would be used as a political tool for extreme-right nationalists. Jōdo, or rather elements of Jōdo, got a special reprieve once the occupation forces decided it was useful in the new administration of Japan, more specifically in the Tokyo riot-police department.
- ^d The number of headmasters is counted by combining all the known headmasters of all the branches of Shintō Musō-ryū Jōdo including the founder of Katori Shinto-ryū and Kashima Jikishinkage-ryū. Gonnosuke trained in the KSR and received a full license.

== Acronyms used in text ==
- KSR= Katori Shinto-ryū
- SMR= Shintō Musō-ryū
- TSKSR= Tenshin Shoden Katori Shintō-ryū

== See also ==
- Bujutsu/budō – The "Way of War" or the "Way of the warrior".
- Daimyō – The feudal landowner of feudal Japan. Employed samurai as warriors in a vassal/lord relationship to both protect and expand the Daimyos domains before and during the Sengoku Jidai period. The Daimyo as a position lasted until the Meiji restoration and abolishment of the feudal system.
- Ko-ryū – Japanese martial arts created before the 1876 banning of the samurai sword. Any art created that was created post-1876, such as Judo, Karate, Aikido, Taidō, are considered to be Gendai budō. Karate, although preceding 1876, does not qualify as koryū due to the fact it did not evolve in Japan but on the Ryūkyū Islands (modern Okinawa Prefecture) which did not become a part of Japan until the 17th century.
- Samurai – The warrior elite of feudal Japan. The Samurai caste was abolished in the Meiji restoration's aftermath.
  - Ashigaru – Originally the conscripted footsoldiers of Samurai-armies. After Tokugawa came into power they became professional soldiers and the lowest ranking samurai.
