= Ittatsu-ryū =

School of hojojutsu Japanese martial art

Ittatsu-ryū (一達流)
- Ko-ryū

Foundation
- Founder: Matsuzaki Kinuemon Tsunekatsu (fl. c.17th century)
- Date founded: c.17th century
- Period founded: Mid-to-late Edo period

Current information
- Current headmaster: No single headmaster

Arts taught
- Art: Description
- Hojōjutsu: Rope-tying art

Descendant schools
- Shintō Musō-ryū

Ittatsu-ryū (一達流) is a traditional school (koryū) of the Japanese martial art of hojōjutsu. Today, Ittatsu-ryū has been assimilated into the traditional school of Shintō Musō-ryū. This particular school of hojōjutsu was created in the late 17th century by Matsuzaki Kinueimon Shigekatsu, the third Shintō Musō-ryū headmaster. The modern Ittatsu-ryū system comprises 24 training-forms (kata), grouped into 3 different series.

== History ==
Hojōjutsu (捕縄術) or Nawajutsu, (縄術) is the traditional Japanese martial skill of restraining a person using cord or rope (Hojō). It found use on both on and off the battlefield in up to 125 individual martial arts schools. It was used in particular by the various police-forces of the Edo-period and remains in use to this day with the Tokyo police force. In the warring-era (1467–1615) it was not uncommon for warriors carrying a rope for use as a tool or as a restraint for prisoners of war when on campaign. The rope is to be used on an opponent after he or she has been subdued using restraining methods (torite) such as the methods found in the Ikkaku-ryū juttejutsu system.

Ittatsu-ryū Hojōjutsu was created in the 17th century by Matsuzaki Kin'ueimon Shigekatsu, the third shihanke of the Shintō Musō-ryū, who also created the Ikkaku-ryū, and later transmitted through the "New Just" (Shintō) Musō-ryū tradition as its main rope-art. The rope used in Ittatsu-ryū is about 5 meters in length and a diameter of about 3.5 mm.

Although handcuffs have generally replaced the rope, there exists today a modern form of hojojutsu in the Tokyo policeforce. This system was derived mainly from the Ittatsu-ryū tradition and were taught by the Shintō Musō-ryū Shihanke Shimizu Takaji in his formal duty as a police force instructor in the mid 20th century.

== Hojō methods ==
In the strict social-system of the Tokugawa-era (1603–1868) there was a high emphasis on treating each individual according to what class the individual belonged to. Each of the Ittatsu-ryu form(kata)-series is adapted to deal with the social status of the individual being restrained. A samurai-lord, (if being arrested for a crime), would have to be restrained in a way that enables the individual to retain his or her dignity. Women, priests (of either shinto or Buddhist faith), samurai, and commoners (considered to be near bottom of the class-system) would have to be restrained in a way that represented their position in the class-hierarchy without disgracing them.

== Training ==
The hojō-methods are for the most part taught only to advanced students who have achieved a high level of proficiency in the Shinto Muso-ryu Jodo forms, though the level required is not standardized and different Jodo-organisations have different requirements.

== List of Ittatsu-ryū Hojōjutsu forms ==
The modern-day Ittatsu-ryū system comprises 24 forms of rope-tying divided between 3 series called Ge, Chû and Jô.

Ge (inferior) series

1. Ichimonji haya nawa (一文字早繩)
2. Hane tsuki haya nawa (翅付繩)
3. Hitoe bishi nawa (一重菱繩)
4. Shin no hane tsuki nawa (眞翅付繩)
5. Ya hazu nawa (矢筈繩)
6. Sumi chigai nawa (角違繩)
7. Shin no tombô nawa (眞蜻蛉繩)
8. Happô garami nawa (八方搦繩)
9. Yagura bishi nawa (櫓菱繩)

Chû (middle) series

1. Hishi haya nawa (菱早繩)
2. Hishi nawa (菱繩)
3. Jûmonji nawa (十文字繩)
4. Bajô hane tsuki nawa (馬上翅付繩)
5. Tombô nawa (蜻蛉繩)
6. Shin no futae bishi nawa (眞二重菱繩)
7. Shin no kikô nawa (眞龜甲繩)
8. Yagura bishi nawa (櫓菱繩)

Jô (higher) series

1. Jûmonji haya nawa (十文字早繩)
2. Jûmonji nawa (十文字繩)
3. Futae bishi nawa (二重菱繩)
4. Kikô nawa (龜甲繩)
5. Age maki nawa (揚卷繩)
6. Shin no hane tsuki nawa (眞翅付繩)
7. Munewari hitoe bishi nawa (胸割一重菱繩)
8. Kiri nawa (切繩)

== See also ==
- Edo period
- Hojojutsu
- Shinto Muso-ryu
