= Shintō Musō-ryū =

Traditional school of jōjutsu

Shintō Musō-ryū (神道夢想流)
- Ko-ryū
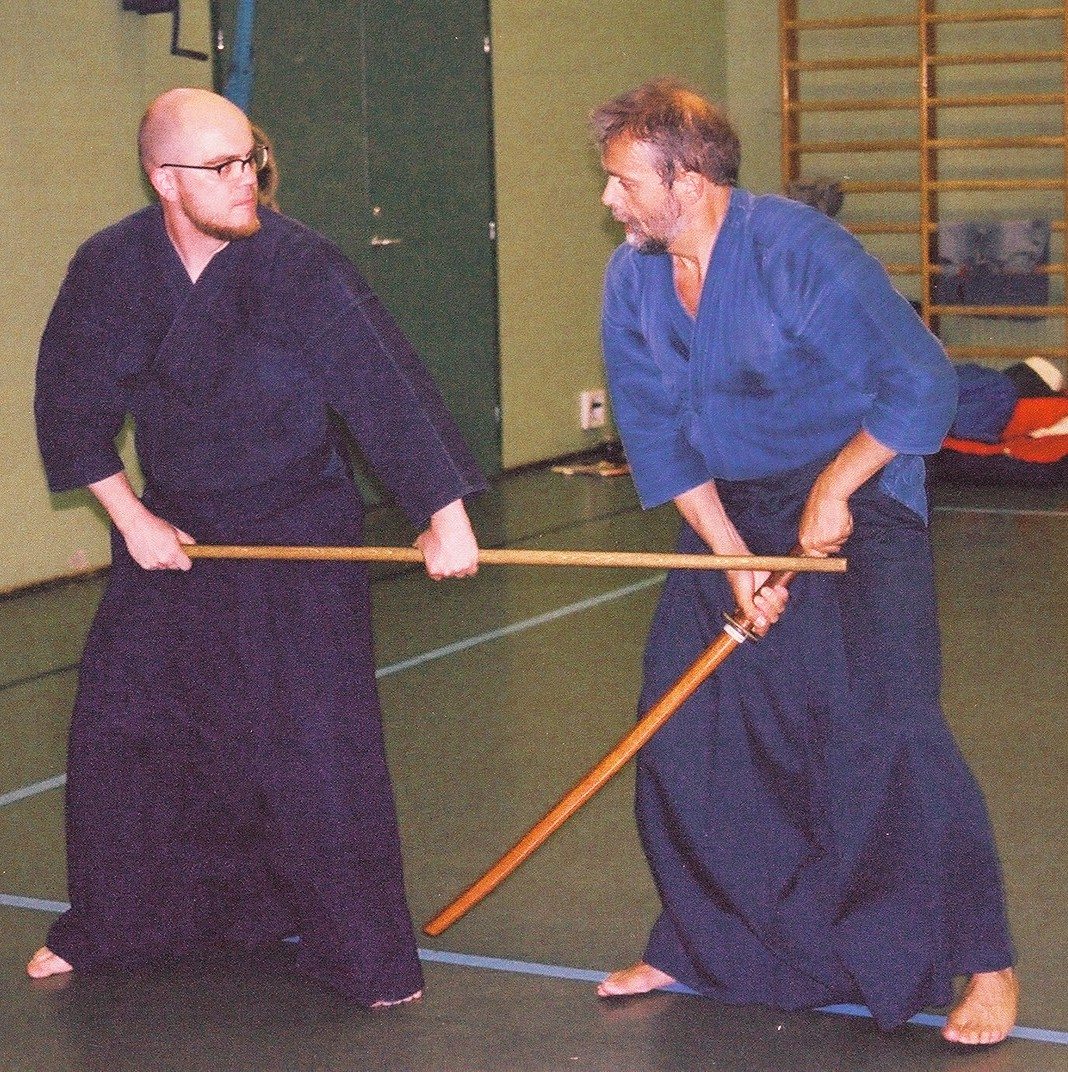

Foundation
- Founder: Musō Gonnosuke Katsuyoshi (夢想 權之助 勝吉, fl. c.1605, dates of birth and death unknown)
- Date founded: Sometime between 1602 and 1614
- Period founded: Early Edo period

Current information
- Current headmaster: No single leader. 25th and last (unofficial) headmaster was Takaji Shimizu.
- Current headquarters: No single headquarters

Arts taught
- Art: Description
- Jōdō or jōjutsu: Art of the staff
- Kenjutsu: Sword art
- Tanjōjutsu: Art of wielding a walking stick
- Kusarigamajutsu: Art of the chain and sickle
- Hojōjutsu: Rope-tying art
- Juttejutsu: Art of the truncheon

Ancestor schools
- Tenshin Shōden Katori Shintō-ryū

Assimilated schools
- Ikkaku-ryū • Ittatsu-ryū • Isshin-ryū • Shintō (Kasumi)-ryū • Uchida-ryū

Descendant schools
- Keijojutsu • Seitei Jodo

Shintō Musō-ryū, or Shindō Musō-ryū (神道夢想流),^{a} most commonly known by its practice of jōdō, is a traditional school (koryū) of the Japanese martial art of jōjutsu, or the art of wielding the short staff (jō). The technical purpose of the art is to learn how to defeat a swordsman in combat using the jō, with an emphasis on proper combative distance, timing and concentration. The system includes teachings of other weapon systems which are contained in Shintō Musō-ryū as auxiliary arts (Fuzoku ryuha). The school is sometimes abbreviated as SMR.

The art was founded by the samurai Musō Gonnosuke Katsuyoshi (夢想 權之助 勝吉, fl. c.1605, dates of birth and death unknown) in the early Edo period (1603–1868) and, according to legend, first put to use in a duel with Miyamoto Musashi (宮本 武蔵, 1584–1645). The original art created by Musō Gonnosuke has evolved and been added upon ever since its inception and up to modern times. The art was successfully brought outside of its original domain in Fukuoka and outside Japan itself in the 19th and 20th century. The spreading of Shintō Musō-ryū beyond Japan was largely the effort of Takaji Shimizu, (1896–1978), considered the 25th^{d} headmaster, who, unlike many other traditional martial arts teachers, wanted Jodo to be known and taught internationally. With the assistance of his own students and the cooperation of the kendō community, Shimizu spread Shintō Musō-ryū worldwide.

== History ==
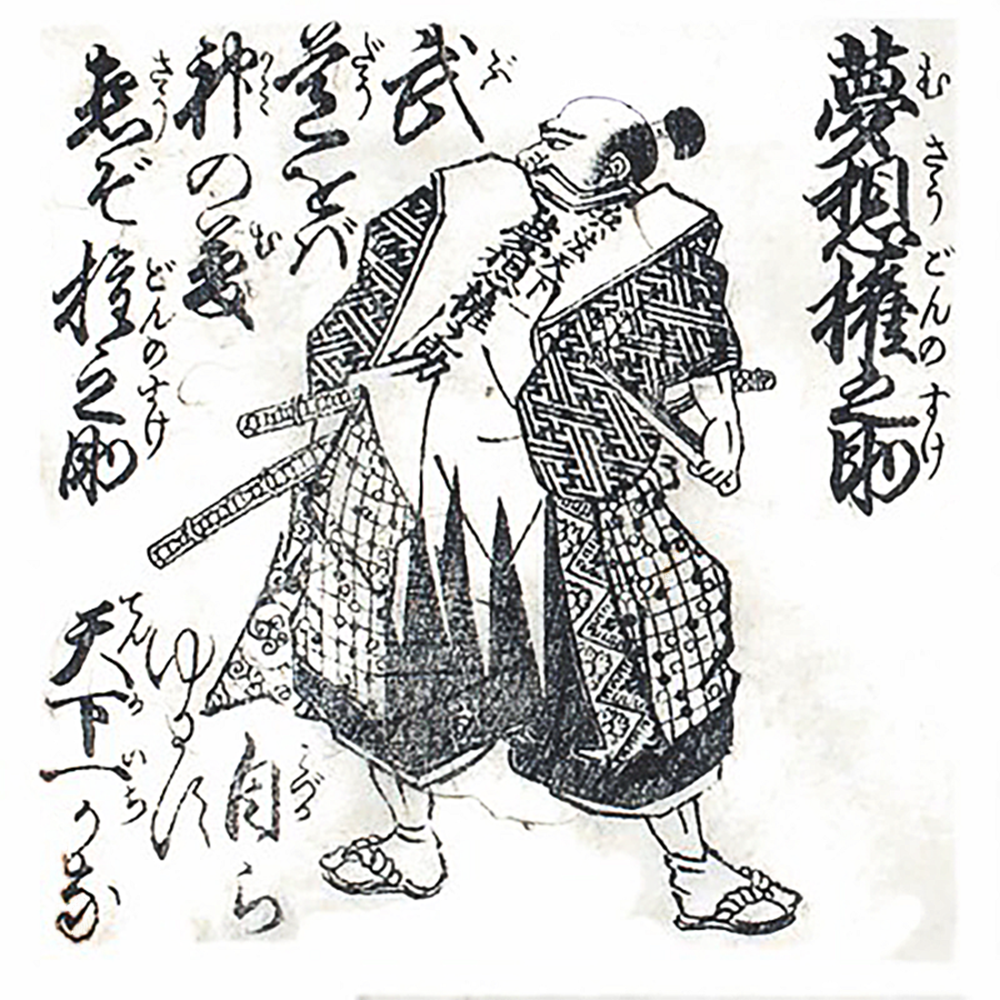
Musō Gonnosuke Katsuyoshi, founder of Shintō Musō-ryū (Image from the Buko Hyakunin Isshu)

According to its own history, Shintō Musō-ryū was founded in the Keichō era (1594–1614) by Musō Gonnosuke, a samurai with considerable martial arts experience. A wandering warrior (Rōnin), Gonnosuke would eventually cross paths with the famous swordsman Miyamoto Musashi. The two men fought a duel in which Musashi defeated Gonnosuke. Gonnosuke, a proud warrior who according to the stories had never been defeated, was deeply shocked by his defeat and retired to a cave for meditation and reflection. This period of isolation led him to create a set of techniques for the jō, with a goal of defeating Musashi's two-sword style. These jo techniques constituted the core of Gonnosuke's new school (ryu), which he named Shintō Musō-ryū.

The school's history states that Musō Gonnosuke was victorious in a second duel, using his newly developed jōjutsu techniques to either defeat Musashi or force the duel into a draw. One of several legends says that while resting near a fire in a certain temple, Gonnosuke heard a voice say, "With the round stick, know the strategy of the solar plexus" (丸木を以って、水月を知れ, maruki wo motte, suigetsu wo shire). Supposedly that was his inspiration to develop his new techniques and go fight Musashi a second time.

Gonnosuke used his training in kenjutsu, naginatajutsu, sōjutsu and bōjutsu, which he acquired in part from Tenshin Shōden Katori Shintō-ryū and Kashima Jikishinkage-ryū, to develop his art.

..know the solar plexus with a round stick

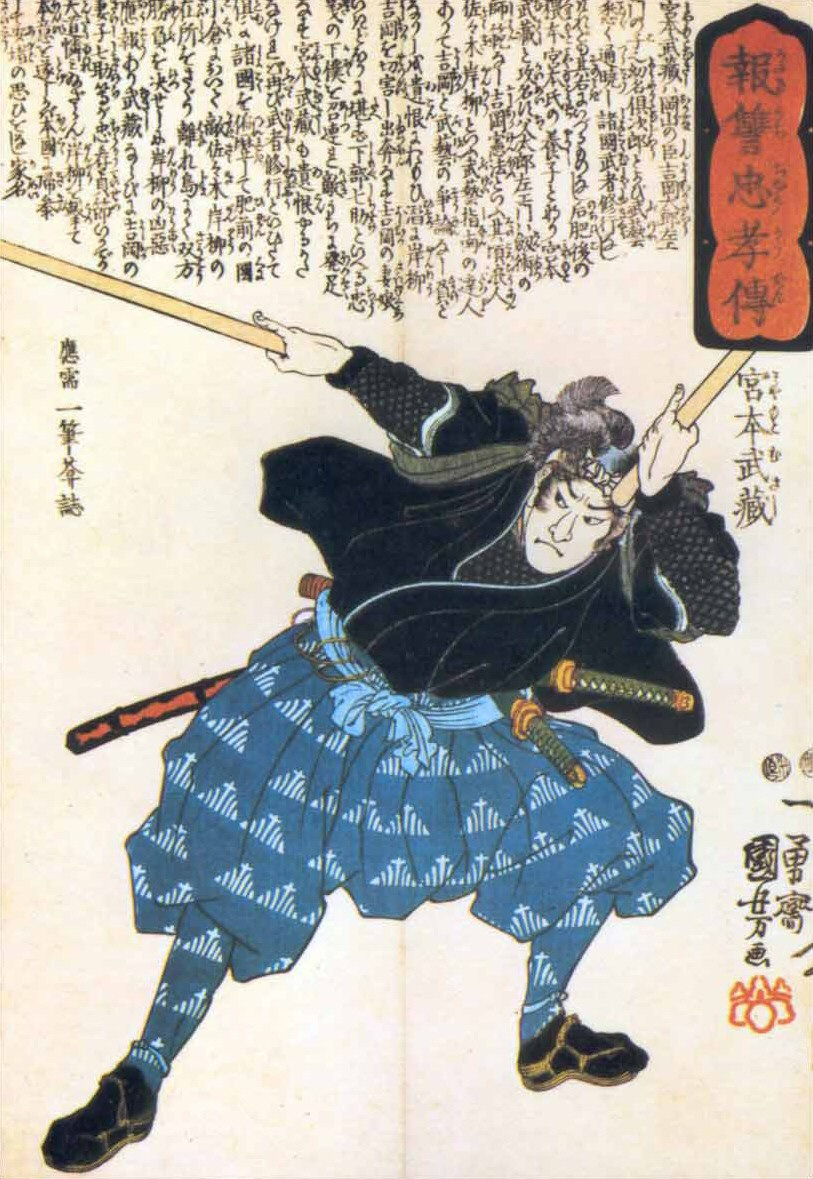
Miyamoto Musashi wielding two wooden swords. The legend states that Musō Gonnosuke found a way to break Musashi's two-sword style of combat and defeat him.

Gonnosuke was said to have fully mastered the secret form called The Sword of One Cut (Ichi no Tachi), a form that was developed by the founder of the Kashima Shintō-ryū and later spread to other Kashima schools such as Kashima Jikishinkage-ryū and Kashima Shin-ryū. Gonnosuke developed several techniques for the jō that were to be used against an opponent armed with a sword, partially by using the superior length of the jō to keep the swordsman at a disadvantage. After the creation of his jō techniques and his establishment as a skilled jōjutsu practitioner he was invited by the Kuroda clan of Fukuoka, in northern Kyūshū, to teach his art to their warriors. Gonnosuke accepted the invitation and settled down there.

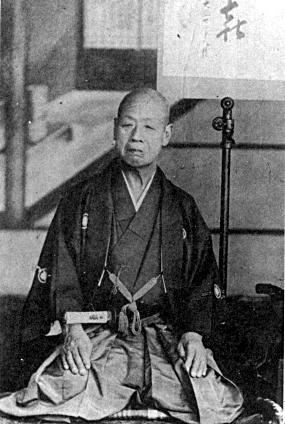
Shiraishi Hanjirō (1842–1927, 白石半次郎), Shintō Musō-ryū's 24th unofficial headmaster

Shintō Musō-ryū survived the abolishment of the samurai in 1877, and the Second World War. With the efforts made by Shiraishi Hanjirō and his successor Shimizu Takaji (清水隆次), the art's 24th and 25th unofficial headmasters, respectively, the art progressed into an international martial art with numerous dōjō all over the world.

== Modern day Shintō Musō-ryū ==
=== Jōdō and jōjutsu ===
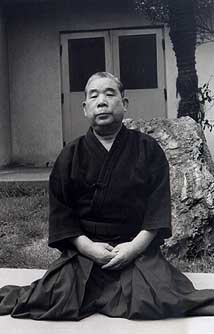
Shimizu Takaji (1896–1978), Shintō Musō-ryū's 25th unofficial headmaster and the art's leading personality during the 20th century

Because Shintō Musō-ryū has had no single head-organization or single governing body since the late 1600s, there is no standardized way of passing on the tradition. Dōjos belonging to individual SMR groups have individual ways of training and passing on the tradition. As with several other arts, such as iaidō and aikidō, Shimizu Takaji renamed "jōjutsu" "jōdō" in the year 1940. (Note that the use of the appellation "jōdō" is still not universal for all SMR practitioners and groups.) The words jōjutsu and jōdō are normally used interchangeably by the various groups.

==== Staff methods ====
Being a koryū, an old school with a traditional way of teaching, SMR relies on verbal instructions (as opposed to the detailed manuals of the more modern era) in order to teach the large majority of the practical applications in the art. The teacher-student relationship is very important to koryu-arts. The training forms (kata) alone do not (and cannot for practical reasons) reveal all the large number of practical applications and variations of the techniques. This can only be done properly by an experienced teacher who spends many years passing on the teachings to the student in person. Many koryū arts have deliberately hidden some, or all, applications inside their training forms, making them invisible unless properly explained by a teacher knowledgeable in the art. This was done as a way of making sure the secrets and principles could not be copied by rival schools or individuals, should an outsider accidentally (or by deliberate spying) observe the techniques in action.

The SMR tradition has been shaped over the centuries as to teach the student the proper value and application of combative distance to the opponent (maai), posture (shisei), and mental awareness (zanshin), among other skills. As a traditional Japanese martial art, there is also a high emphasis on etiquette, such as bowing (rei) and attaining a proper mental attitude in the student and the approach to training.

In the pure fighting art of SMR, the aim is to use the staff to defeat an opponent armed with one or two swords. The staff is a flexible weapon and can be used in several ways. A practitioner can use the greater length of the staff to keep the opponent at a distance. It is also used, when applicable, to get very close to the opponent and then to control the opponent's arms or hands. The staff can be used in a manner that enables the wielder to defeat the opponent without killing him. Common methods include controlling the opponent's hands, wrists, and other targets by using the staff to either strike, thrust or otherwise manipulate the target-areas. When applicable, more lethal strikes are aimed at the opponent's more vital areas such as the head, solar plexus and temples.

==== Training ====
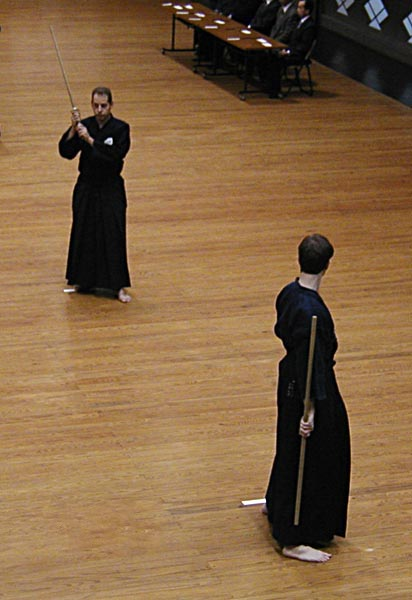
Demonstrating Hissage no kamae, a tactical position to hide the staff behind the back and leg for surprise deployment against an opponent

SMR techniques are taught by forms (kata) and fundamentals (kihon). There exists no form of organized and standardized sparring-system such as in karate, kendō, judō and other modern Japanese Arts. New students usually start with the twelve kihon. This process includes slowly working its way into the first series of "kata", which starts with the "Omote"-series. There are approximately 64 forms with the jo, although the number can vary from the individual SMR groups and organizations. The auxiliary arts incorporate their own sets of forms with their respective weapons.

A normal training session is very systematic with the teacher, or a senior student, commanding the pace and direction of the session. Depending on the individual dōjō or organization, the entire group of trainees often starts training as one body, especially during warm-ups and drills. Often, the training then is split into beginner and advanced groups. Drills and forms involving newer students are often performed with a more senior student taking on the role of the attacker, or "striking sword" (打太刀, uchidachi). In paired techniques and drills, the receiver of the attack is called "doing sword" (仕太刀, shidachi). The uchidachi usually is senior to the shidachi in terms of experience. This is done as a way to develop the younger shidachi's skill by having them face a more experienced and confident swordsman, which thus heightens the combative feeling.

===== Safety =====
Training under a responsible leader is done with a high emphasis on student safety. Unlike the wooden sword, which is not as dangerous as a katana, there is no "safer" version of the staff and the weapon used in training is the same weapon that would have been used in actual combat. When applying strikes or thrusts to the head the student is taught not to use full force but to halt the staff within a few centimeters of the respective left or right temples or other parts of the head. Other less sensitive areas on the human body do make contact with the staff, though with much reduced force. The practice of forms and techniques is conducted under the supervision of a senior student who ensures the techniques and forms are proper and within safety margins.

===== Etiquette and traditions in the dōjō =====
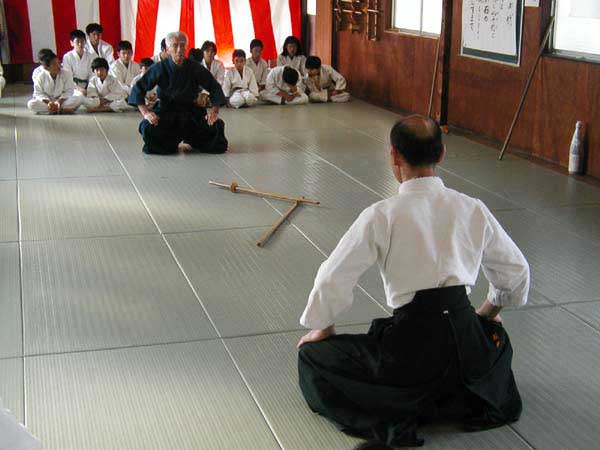
Tsuneo Nishioka and Katsuhiko Arai demonstrating Kazari, the traditional bowing before/after a kata

A typical Shintō Musō-ryū dōjō practices the same courtesy and manners as found in Japanese society generally, placing great emphasis on etiquette and tradition. In some dōjō, Japanese verbal commands are used to guide basics, warm-ups, and the training of the "standard forms" (seiteigata).

The traditional Japanese bow (rei) is practiced in all Japanese and Western dōjō. Although not all dōjō use exactly the same routine, they do generally contain the same set of principles. Students bow to the front of the dōjō (shōmen) when entering the dōjō or leaving it, and observes the hierarchy with instructors (sensei), seniors (senpai), and juniors (kōhai).

During the practice of basics and forms, certain rules of behavior are applied when switching positions and weapons between shidachi and uchidachi. This is done in order to have an orderly training session and to reflect good manners, as well as for safety reasons. The students bow before and after finishing a specific series of kata, drills or any other type of exercise. The switching of weapons is, by tradition and experience, a way to minimize any threatening appearance and show respect for the training partner.

Kazari 飾り(かざり) is the traditional SMR-way of initiating and ending kata-training. Kazari (meaning ”ornament”) is also done in all the auxiliary arts. Kazari starts with the two practitioners crossing their weapons and placing them crossed on the floor, retiring a few steps to perform a squatted bow (rei), and ends which the practitioners going forward to retain their weapons and start kata-training. The principle of Kazari is found in other unrelated martial arts as well, although not necessarily by the same name.

===== Forms (kata) =====
The practice of forms (kata) is an old way of teaching traditional martial arts in Japan, and is the core of many "old school/flow" (koryū) martial arts. Forms are used as a way to teach advanced techniques and maneuvers through a series of scripted movements and actions against one or several opponents. In the majority of the old martial arts, forms are at the center of the art with little or no sparring as compared to modern martial arts (gendai budō) such as Karate, Kendō or Jūdō.

The modern Shintō Musō-ryū system holds approximately 64 staff-forms divided into several series, though this number is including variations and is not always counted as an individual form. Students following the teachings of Shimizu Takaji normally learn 5 more kata in a separate series called Gohon-no-midare. This series is not taught in all SMR-groups. A common procedure is for new students to begin their form training by learning two or more forms from the "standard staff forms" (seitei jōdō, 制定杖道) due to their (relative) technical simplicity.

The series Gohon no midare (五本の乱れ) was created by Shimizu in the late 1930s and are not part of the original "scroll of transmission" (denshō), which contains the list of official SMR techniques. Thus, the Gohon no midare is not taught in all Shintō Musō-ryū dōjō.

===== Basic techniques =====
The "basic techniques of striking and thrusting" (kihon no uchi tsuki waza, 基本の打ち突き技) form a system of twelve techniques drawn from the existing kata with minor modifications. They are used as a way to better introduce a new student to jōdō and also are a good tool for further skill development for seniors. The basic techniques were developed and systematized mainly by Shimizu Takaji at his Tokyo dōjō, for the purpose of easing the introduction to (complex) forms training. Shimizu's peer, Takayama Kiroku, leader of the Fukuoka Shintō Musō-ryū Dōjō, saw the value of these basic techniques and introduced them into his own training sessions. Shimizu would eventually remove or modify some of the more dangerous techniques and beginner-level forms so as not to cause injuries to newer students.

The basic techniques are trained both individually (tandoku dosa) and in pairs (sotai dosa), with the defender using the staff and the attacker using the sword. Today, new students normally begin with tandoku dosa, learning the staff first and later switching to the sword, and then finally learning the entire technique with a training partner. The techniques are normally trained in sequence.

During the Edo period and well into the 20th century the attacker was always the senior student, with the defender (being the junior), starting and training only the staff forms for several years before learning the attacker's role. In most modern dōjō, a beginner learns both the sword and staff right from the beginning of his training.

The following are the twelve basic techniques:

1. Honte uchi (本手打, main strike)
2. Gyakute uchi (逆手打, reverse-grip strike)
3. Hikiotoshi uchi (引落打, downward-pulling strike)
4. Kaeshi tsuki (返突, counter thrust)
5. Gyakute tsuki (逆手突, reverse-grip thrust)
6. Maki otoshi (巻落, downward twist)
7. Kuri tsuke (繰付, spin and attach)
8. Kuri hanashi (繰放, spin and release)
9. Tai atari (体当, body strike)
10. Tsuki hazushi uchi (突外打, thrust, release, strike)
11. Dō barai uchi (胴払打, body-reaping strike)
12. Tai hazushi uchi migi (体外打右, body-releasing strike, right side); tai hazushi uchi hidari (体外打左, body-releasing strike, left side)

The twelve basic techniques are used in both Shintō Musō-ryū and in the Seitei jōdō of the All Japan Kendō Federation (Zen Nihon Kendō Renmei, ZNKR, 全日本剣道連盟), although the latter uses a slightly modified version.

==== Seitei Jōdō Kata ====
The Seitei Jōdō kata were developed by Shimizu Takaji in the 1960s and presented to a committee tasked with the creation of a compact Jōdō system to be taught in Kendō dōjōs. The result was the Zen-Nihon Kendo Renmei Seitei Jōdō system consisting of twelve forms and twelve basic techniques. Ten of these forms are drawn from the existing Shintō Musō-ryū Jō forms with minor modifications, and two other forms were created specifically for Seitei Jōdō and based on Uchida-ryū Tanjō-jutsu forms. The latter forms are taught in various Shintō Musō-ryū dōjōs outside the main series of Kata.

=== Grades – new and classical ===
For many of the classical martial arts organizations the highest rank available is the "License of Complete Transmission" (Menkyo Kaiden) of the teachings of the system, and includes the technical as well as oral transmission. This rank is used in many classical martial arts of Japan. In SMR, a student considered for a Menkyo Kaiden must first attain the separate rank of Menkyo. This process will take many years, depending upon the skill, dedication and maturity of the student. Shimizu Takaji himself was issued his Menkyo Kaiden very early in his life in comparison to modern western standards, though he trained for several hours each day.

A person with a fully valid Menkyo Kaiden has the right to teach the art to whoever he or she chooses and also holds the right to issue scrolls of transmissions to his students. The Menkyo Kaiden holder may also, if he so chooses, implement modifications in the SMR system to techniques or kata. As Shintō Musō-ryū does not have a single organization with a single leader, these changes will only be relevant to that teacher's direct students, and will not be universal. Instead, every person who has been issued a Menkyo Kaiden can technically be described as teaching their own variation of the ryū, known as "ha". "Ha" is a variation of a martial arts system taught by a Menkyo Kaiden but is still a part of the main ryū. An example of this is the Ittō-ryū school of kenjutsu. After the first generation died out, the school transformed into the Ono-ha Ittō-ryū. However, if a Menkyo Kaiden decided to make radical changes to the system, such as adding or removing parts of the art, he would be departing from belonging to a ha, and in effect be creating a new style.

So far in the post Shimizu Takaji SMR history, there has been no organisation who has taken the "-ha" description for their respective new branch. Shimizu Takaji himself, who introduced a set of basic techniques (kihon), and even a new series of kata (Gohon no midare) to the SMR Jo system, did not name his expanded system as "Shimizu-ha Shinto Muso Jo".

There are five classical ranks in Shintō Musō-ryū, as follows in ascending order of seniority:

1. Certificate of Entering the Interior (奥入書, Oku-iri-sho)
2. First Syllabus (初目録, Sho-mokuroku)
3. Later Syllabus (後目録, Go-mokuroku)
4. License (免許, Menkyo) – Awarded after the first of the five Gokui-kata have been taught.
5. License of Complete Transmission (免許皆伝, Menkyo Kaiden) – Once all five Gokui-kata have been learned, the Menkyo scroll is officially stamped by the senior instructor and thus becomes a Menkyo Kaiden.

==== Grades in the All Japan Kendo Federation Jōdō Section ====
The Jōdō Section of the All Japan Kendo Federation has adopted the modern dan/kyu system going from Ikkyu (1st Kyu, 一級) to Hachidan (8th Dan, 八段). Additionally, there are the three teaching licences of Renshi (錬士), Kyōshi (教士) and Hanshi (範士) (collectively known as Shōgō (称号)) which can be awarded at the last three grades (6th, 7th and 8th Dan respectively). As the practical examination for these grades involves only Seitei, they are not representative of a practitioner's koryū ability.

==== Other forms of Grades ====
Modern-day Shintō Musō-ryū is practiced within several large independent organizations which includes the European Jodo Federation, Nihon Jōdōkai, International Jōdō Federation, International Jodo Association, Sei Ryu Kai to name a few. As such the individual organizations has different grading requirements and in some cases different type of grades.

===== European Jōdō Federation =====
EJF is headed by Pascal Krieger and incorporates three separate grade systems.

1. The classical system of giving licenses of transmission: "Oku-iri", "Shomokuroku", "Gomokuroku", "Menkyo" and "Menkyo Kaiden".
2. The dan/kyū system which is used in the majority of modern Japanese martial arts today.
3. The "Shoden, Chūden and Okuden" ranks, put into effect by Donn F. Draeger and Pascal Krieger. It is used today by the International Jodo Federation and its sub-organisations including the European Jodo Federation.

===== Grades in the International Jōdō Association =====
The IJA follows the grading system used by Ichitarō Kuroda. Students grade up to 5th dan and thereafter receive licenses of transmission. Students must also grade with the Zen Nippon Kendō Renmei in the Seitei series of Kata.

1. The classical system of giving licenses of transmission: "Oku-iri", "Shomokuroku", "Gomokuroku", "Menkyo" and "Menkyo Kaiden".
2. The dan/kyu system. Grades are issued up to 5th dan.

===== Grades in the Nihon Jōdōkai =====
NJK was headed by Kaminoda Tsunemori and incorporates two separate grade-systems.

1. The classical system of giving licenses of transmission: "Oku-iri", "Sho-mokuroku", "Go-mokuroku", "Menkyo" and "Menkyo Kaiden".
2. A new system developed by Kaminoda Tsunemori's organization to replace the Dan/Kyū system. The new system involves three ranks in three jō-kata series, "Basic" (表, Omote), "Middle-level" (中段, Chūdan) and "Shadow" (影, Kage), after which the classical grade-system is used.

Ranks attainable in the Omote series:

- Basic Technique, First Grade (表技初級, Omote-waza Sho Kyū)
- Basic Technique, Middle Grade (表技中級, Omote-waza Chū Kyū)
- Basic Technique, Upper Grade (表技上級, Omote-waza Jō Kyū)

Ranks attainable in the Chūdan series:

- Middle-level Technique, First Grade (中段技初級, Chūdan-waza Sho Kyū)
- Middle-level Technique, Middle Grade (中段技中級, Chūdan-waza Chū Kyū)
- Middle-level Technique, Upper Grade (中段技上級, Chūdan-waza Jō Kyū)

Ranks attainable in the Kage series:

- Shadow Technique, First Grade (影技初級, Kage-waza Sho Kyū)
- Shadow Technique, Middle Grade (影技中級, Kage-waza Chū Kyū)
- Shadow Technique, Upper Grade (影技上級, Kage-waza Jō Kyū)

=== Weapons and training gear ===
==== Jō – The staff ====
- The jō is featured in several Japanese martial arts. For more information see the jō and Jodo articles.

A Jo made of red oak, approximately 128 cm long

The jō is a cylindrical wooden staff approximately 128 cm in length. In modern times, the measurements have been fixed at 128 cm in length and between 2.4 and 2.6 cm in width, though in the Edo-period the length of the jō was customized to suit the height of the wielder. The jō is used in several gendai and koryu martial arts, such as aikidō and Tendō-ryū.

The jō, like its larger sibling the Bō, was never an effective killing-weapon on the battlefield in comparison to the sword, spear, glaive and bow. Although the jō and most other staves could be used to lethal effect when thrust at vital points of the body, when faced with a fully armored opponent those vital points would in most cases be covered by armour-plating. As a result, there were very few ryu that were dedicated to the staff-arts in the warring era with other more effective weapons were available, but there are several ryu that include jō techniques in its system. One example is the jō-tradition found in the koryū art Tendō-ryū Naginatajutsu, founded in 1582. In Tendō-ryū, which uses the Naginata as the primary weapon, there are techniques with the jō that simulates a scenario where the naginata has been cut in two and the wielder has to defend himself with the staff-portion only. With the onset of peace with the start of the Edo-period (1603–1867), the conflicts with heavy armored warriors became a thing of the past. In this era, the jō art would come into its own against non-armored samurai, rōnin, bandits, and other opponents. It was extensively used to police the local clan domains.

Various other martial arts also include elements of jō that are not necessarily related to Shintō Musō-ryū. One of the most famous promoter of the jō outside of Shintō Musō-ryū in modern times, and indeed in the martial arts community as a whole, was the founder of Aikidō, Morihei Ueshiba. Ueshiba trained in a variety of ryu including Yagyū swordsmanship, but is not known to have trained in Shintō Musō-ryū. Ueshiba also used the long staff bō to perform the same techniques.

==== Ken – The sword ====
- The sword is featured in several Japanese martial arts. For more information see the Kenjutsu article.

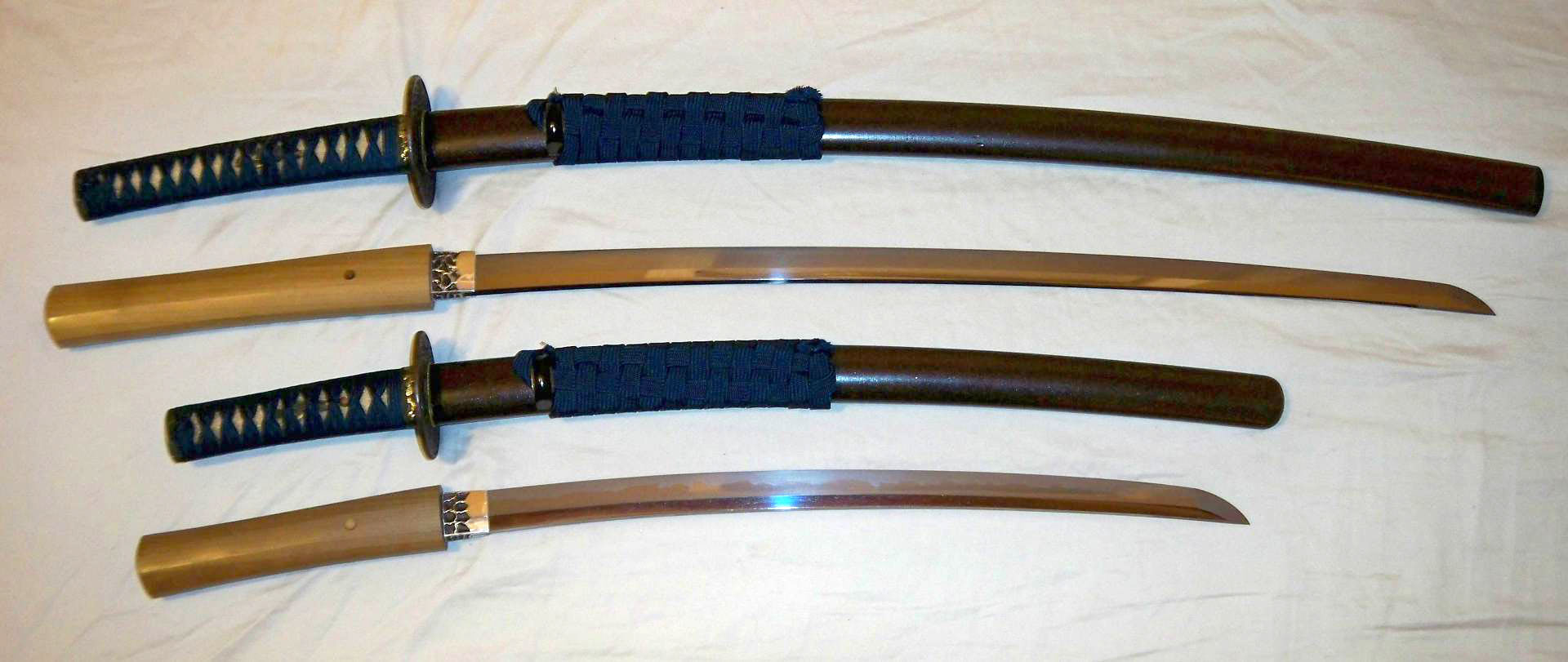

The Japanese sword, with its long history and many variations, has a prominent role in Shintō Musō-ryū. For training purposes, wooden swords (bokken) are used to minimize the risk of injuries. Practitioners use both the long wooden sword, generally called a bokutō or bokken, and the short wooden sword that is referred to as a kodachi (meant to represent the wakizashi, or simply "short sword" in both interpretations).

Every form (kata) starts with the attacker, called uchidachi, attacking the defender (shidachi), who in turn defeats the opponent. In a few of the kata, the bokken is used in tandem with the kodachi, but most forms require only the kodachi or bokken. In addition to the sword training provided in jō kata, an addition of twelve kenjutsu-kata is found in SMR.

==== Clothing ====
In the majority of dōjos today, the jōdōka essentially uses the same clothing as practitioners of kendō, minus the armour and other protective padding: A blue/indigo uwagi (jacket), an obi (belt, often the same type as used in iaidō), a blue or black hakama (wide trousers used by samurai). The type of clothing worn is not universal for all Shintō Musō-ryū dōjōs. In some dōjōs, which in addition to jōdō may also have aikidō practitioners, the white keikogi and regular white trousers are allowed. All-white keikogi and Hakama are also used in various dōjo and/or on special occasions such as public demonstrations or competitions.^{b}

=== Fuzoku Ryūha (Assimilated Schools) of Shintō Musō-ryū ===
The original Shintō Musō-ryū tradition is composed of around 59 jō kata and is divided into seven sets. (The "Gohon-no-midare" kata series and the 12 "kihon" are a modern invention.) Together with the 12 kenjutsu kata they compose the core of the SMR-tradition. From the Edo period to the Meiji period, several other arts were assimilated (fuzoku) into the various branches of Shintō Musō-ryū and were meant to be practiced alongside the main jō forms. But, for all intents and purposes, each of the fuzoku ryūha retain a separate identity with their own history and tradition and are generally not taught to people outside the SMR-tradition. Over the years several lineages of Gonnosuke's original art have added or dropped other fuzoku ryūha.

Matsuzaki Kin'emon was the third headmaster of SMR and is credited with the creation of the Ittatsu-ryū and the Ikkaku-ryu. These two arts were taught in the Kuroda-domain as a complement to the combat-arts of the bushi (warriors) which included the staff, sword and musketry. The arts were not specifically SMR-arts though they were taught to the same students. After the fall of the Samurai the two arts found their way into the SMR-tradition as taught by Shiraishi Hanjirō, the art's 24th unofficial headmaster.

In many Shintō Musō-ryū dōjo, the assimilated arts are not normally taught to a student until he/she has reached a designated level of experience & expertise and a certain level of proficiency in the jō forms. These designated levels are not standard but vary according to each organizations preference.

==== Isshin-ryū kusarigamajutsu ====
Isshin-ryū kusarigamajutsu is a school of handling the chain and sickle weapon. The 24th unofficial headmaster of Shinto Musō Ryu, Shiraishi Hanjirō, received a full license (Menkyo) in Isshin-ryū from Morikata Heisaku in the late 19th century,. Shiraishi would later transmit the Isshin-ryū to his own Jōdō students. Isshin-ryū should not be confused with the modern Okinawan karate system Isshin-ryu.

==== Ikkaku-ryū juttejutsu ====
Ikkakū-ryū juttejutsu utilizes the jutte as a way of self-defense for use against an attacker armed with a sword (katana). It was originally created by Matsuzaki Kin'emon, the third headmaster of SMR and originally did not limit itself to jutte training but had a variety of weapons. This weapon was mainly used by police forces of the late Edo-period of Japan. Chuwa-ryū tankenjutsu (中和流短剣術) is the name used for this art using the short sword (tanken, 短剣) instead of the jutte.

==== Kasumi Shintō-ryū kenjutsu (Shintō-ryū kenjutsu) ====
A collection of eight long-sword and four short-sword kata, including one two-sword kata are found in Shintō Musō-ryū. Neither the twelve kata nor the art itself had any known name in the Shintō Musō-ryū until the mid-19th century when "Shintō-ryū kenjutsu" started to be used and specific names were given for each of the twelve kata. In the 20th century, "Kasumi Shintō-ryū" or more recently "Shintō Kasumi-ryū" has surfaced as the original name for the twelve kata as taught in the Shintō Musō-ryū, though it is not yet an official name.^{c}

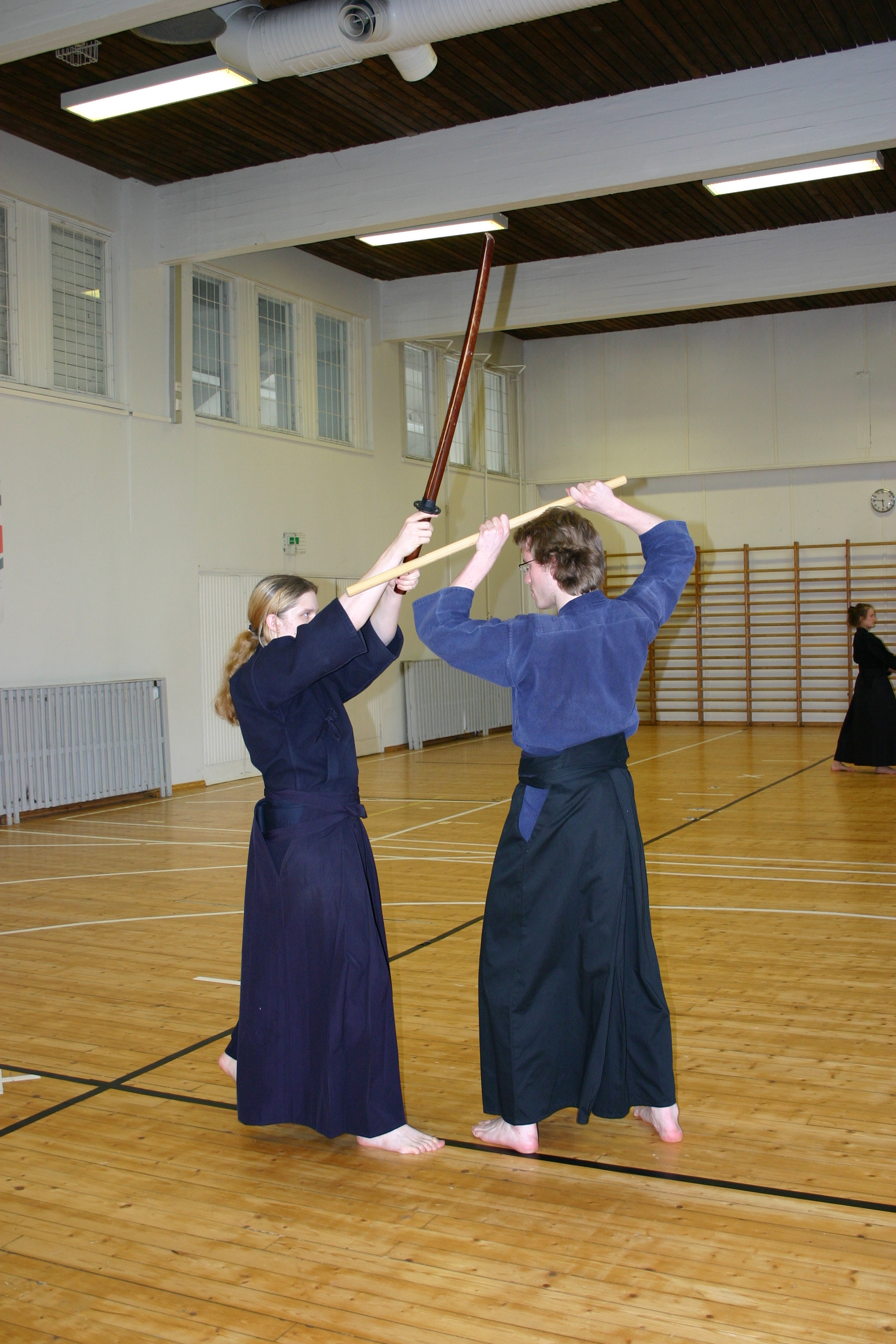
Demonstration of a Uchida-ryū tanjōjutsu kata

==== Uchida-ryū tanjōjutsu – (Sutekki-jutsu) ====
Uchida-ryu is the art of using the tanjō (a 90 cm staff). It was originally created by SMR menkyo Uchida Ryogoro in the late 19th century. It contains twelve kata, which at the time of their inception were loosely organised into a system called "sutteki-jutsu" and were derived mainly from Shintō Musō-ryū and Ikkaku-ryū techniques. "Sutteki" was the Japanese pronouncement of the English word "stick". Sutteki-jutsu was further developed by his son Uchida Ryohei, who systematized his father's work and brought about the modern Uchida-ryū tanjōjutsu system. The art was first known as Sutekki-Jutsu and later named Uchida-ryū in honor of its creator. The art was adopted into SMR to be taught alongside the other arts.

==== Ittatsu-ryū hojōjutsu ====
A school of restraining a person using cord or rope for use by police forces of the Edo-period and up to modern times. Matsuzaki Kinueumon Tsunekatsu, the third headmaster is credited with creating the Ittatsu-ryū.

=== Weapons for integrated arts ===
As with the staff, the weapons found in the integrated arts were not inventions of Shintō Musō-ryū headmasters, but had been created and used long before they were chosen to be taught alongside the Shintō Musō-ryū Jo forms.

==== Jutte (jitte) and tessen ====
- The jutte is featured in several Japanese martial arts. For more information see the jutte article.

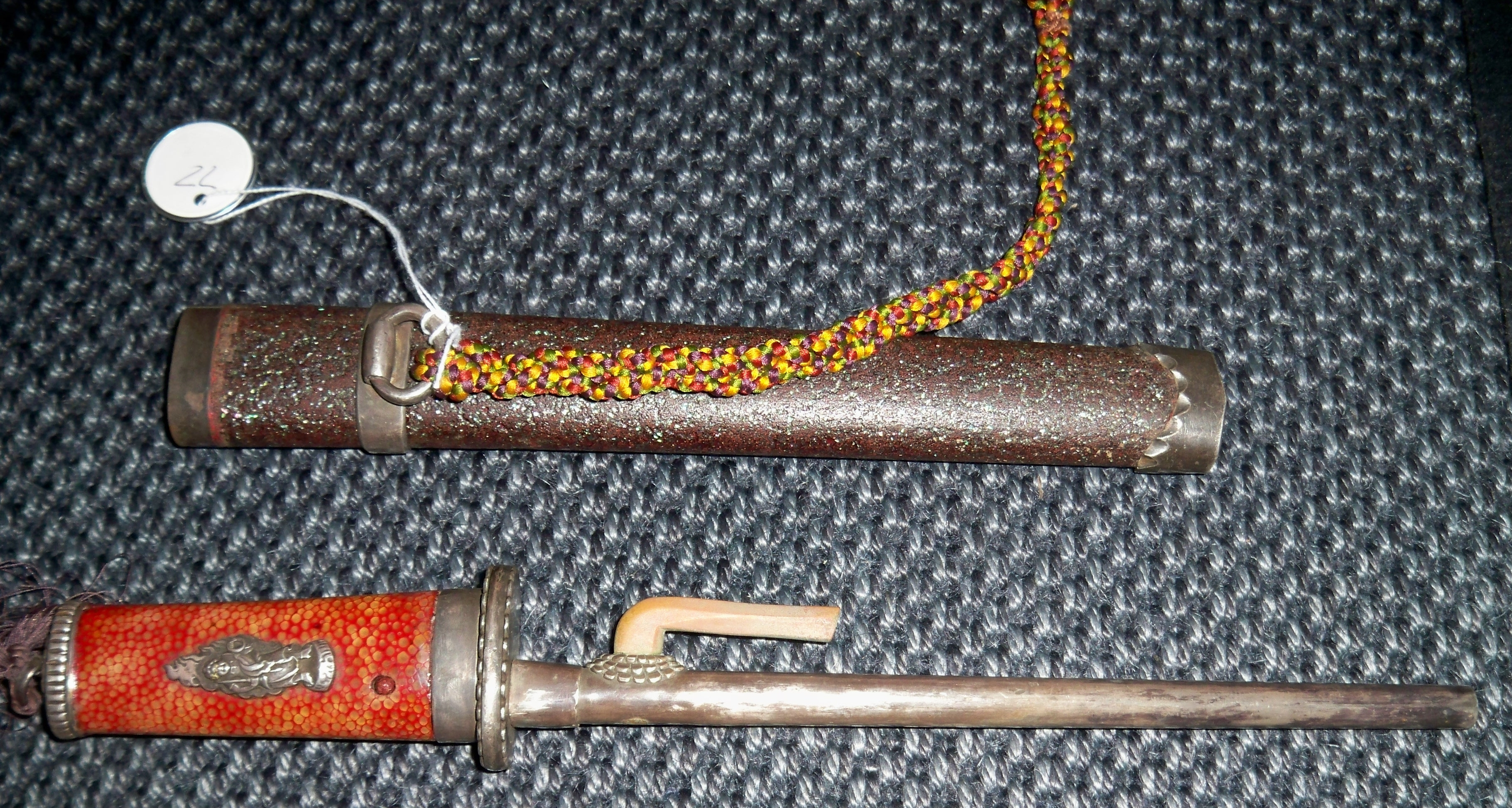
An example of a jutte of the late Samurai-period. This is not a specific Ikkaku-ryu jutte but a generic example.

The jutte (or jitte) was a widespread Edo period police weapon used to control, disarm, and subdue a criminal who would most likely be armed with a sword, without killing him (except in extreme situations). There exists at least 200 known variations of the jutte. The jutte used in Shintō Musō-ryū is approx 45 cm in length. In the integrated art of Ikkaku-ryū juttejutsu, the tessen, or war fan, approximately 30 cm in length, is used in tandem with the jutte in some of the kata.

==== Kusarigama ====
- The kusarigama is featured in several Japanese martial arts. For more information see the Kusarigama article.

The kusarigama is a chain-and-sickle weapon. The weapon is used in several ryu and the design varies from school to school. The kusarigama used in Isshin-ryū has a straight, double-edged 30 cm blade with a wooden handle approx 36 cm long with an iron guard to protect the hand. The chain (kusari) has a heavy iron weight and is attached to the bottom of the handle. The chain is 12 shaku long (3.6 meters) and the attached weight can be thrown against an opponent's weapon, hands or body, either disarming him or otherwise preventing him from properly defending himself against the kama. In some kata, the iron weight is thrown directly at the attackers body causing injury or stunning the opponent. The kusarigama also has non-lethal kata designed to trap and apprehend a swordsman, partially by using the long chain as a restraint. A famous user of the kusarigama outside of Shintō Musō-ryū was Shishido Baiken, who was killed in a duel with the legendary Miyamoto Musashi. During kata practice a safer, all-wooden version (except the metal handguard) is used with softer materials replacing the chain and weight. For demonstrations (embu) a kusarigama with a metal blade is sometimes used.

==== Tanjō ====
The tanjō (短杖, short staff) is a 90 cm short staff used in the assimilated art Uchida-ryū tanjōjutsu. Although of the same length, the tanjo should not be confused with the hanbō, which is used in other martial arts. The modern tanjō is the same width as a standard jō. The tanjō of the Meiji era were thicker at the top and thinner at the bottom, as was the design of the walking-stick at the time. The original inspiration for the tanjō was the western walking-stick which soon found a practical use in self-defense in the Meiji era.

== Organizations ==
After the death of Takaji Shimizu in 1978, SMR in Tokyo was left without a clear leader or appointed successor. This led to a splintering of the SMR dōjos in Japan, and eventually all over the world. With no single organization or individual with complete authority over SMR as a whole, several of the various fully licensed (menkyo) SMR-practitioners established their own organizations both in the West and in Japan.

From the end of the Samurai reign in 1877 to the early 20th century, SMR was still largely confined to Fukuoka city on the southern Japanese island of Kyushu where the art first was created and thrived, although it was slowly spreading. The main proponent of SMR in Fukuoka during the late 19th and early 20th century was Hanjiro Shiraishi, a former Kuroda-clan Bushi (ashigaru), who had trained in, and received a "joint-license" from, the two largest surviving branches of SMR. Among Shiraishi's top students of the early 1900s were Takaji Shimizu (1896–1978), Ichizo Otofuji (1899–1998), and Kiroku Takayama (1893–1938), Takayama being the most senior.

After receiving an invitation from the Tokyo martial arts scene to perform a demonstration of SMR, Shimizu and Takayama established a Tokyo SMR group which held a close working relationship with martial arts supporters such as Jigoro Kano, the founder of Judo. Shiraishi died in 1927, leaving two main lines of SMR. The oldest of the two was in Fukuoka, now under the leadership of Otofuji. The other line was based in Tokyo, and was under the leadership of Shimizu. Takayama, the most senior of the three students of Shiraishi, died in 1938, leaving Shimizu with a position of great influence in the SMR. That position lasted until his death in 1978. Although Otofuji was one of Shiraishi's top students, he was unable to assume the role that Shimizu had held in Tokyo. By the 1970s the Tokyo and Fukuoka SMR communities had developed into separate branches with their own leaders. Unlike Otofuji, Shimizu was a senior of both the Fukuoka and Tokyo SMR, with great knowledge and influence over both. With Shimizu's death, Otofuji was not in a strong enough position to claim authority over the Tokyo SMR and no sort of agreement could be made over who should succeed Shimizu. Otofuji remained the leader of Kyushu SMR until his death in 1998.

From these two lineages, the Fukuoka and the Tokyo, several SMR-based organizations developed. One of the largest is the Jodo Section of the All Japan Kendo Federation (全日本剣道連盟杖道部), established in the 1960s to further promote Jo through the teaching of ZNKR Jodo, also called Seitei Jodo. It remains the most widespread form of Jo in the world today.

== Notable Shintō Musō-ryū practitioners ==
- Donn F. Draeger (1922–1982) – U.S. Menkyo of TSKR and Menkyo of SMR (the latter awarded posthumously)
  - The first foreign student of Takaji Shimizu and the first foreign Menkyo of Katori Shintō-ryū.
- Seiko Fujita (1898–1966)
  - 14th Soke of Kōga-ryū Ninjutsu (and considered by some to be the last true ninja).
  - Writer, in 1953, of a book about the jôjutsu of this specific school
- Hosho Shiokawa – Japanese Menkyo SMR
  - Student of Takaji Shimizu and Nakajima Asakichi
  - Head of Shiokawa-ha of SMR
  - 15th Soke of Mugai-ryu Iaido.
- Ichitaro Kuroda (1911–2000) – Japanese Menkyo SMR
  - Was the senior student of Takaji Shimizu for many years until his death
  - At time of death held 10th dan in arts of Kendo, Jodo, Iaido and Shodo.
- Kaminoda Tsunemori (1928–2015) – Japanese Menkyo SMR
  - Student of Takaji Shimizu
  - Head of Nihon Jodokai
  - Soke of Isshin Ryu Kusarigamajutsu.
- Matsui Kenji – Japanese Menkyo SMR Fukuoka line
  - Menkyo of Asayama Ichiden-ryu
  - Student of Takaji Shimizu and Ichizo Otofuji
  - Scholar and author of several works on SMR-history and lineage.
- Matsumura Shigehiro - Japanese Menkyo in Suio-ryu (jōjutsu and naginata) and of SMR Fukuoka line
  - Student of Takaji Shimizu and Ichizo Otofuji
  - Head of the Kobujodokai organisation.
- Namitome Shigenori - Japanese Menkyo SMR
  - former head of All Japan Kendo Federation's Jodo section
  - Student of Ichizo Otofuji
- Tsuneo Nishioka (1934–2014) – Japanese Menkyo SMR
  - Student of Takaji Shimizu, founder of the SMR-group "Seiryukai"
  - Technical advisor to European Jodo Federation from 1994 to 2014.
- Pascal Krieger, EU Menkyo in SMR
  - Student of Takaji Shimizu and Tsuneo Nishioka (the latter since 1994)
  - Head of European Jodo Federation (EJF)
  - Author of the book "The Way of the Stick" and prominent calligrapher
- Phil Relnick – US Menkyo in SMR and TSKR
  - Student of Tsuneo Nishioka and Takaji Shimizu
  - Pan-American Jo Federation.
- Steven Bellamy – GB Menkyo SMR
  - Student of Takaji Shimizu and Ichitaro Kuroda
  - International Jodo Association. Hanshi 8th dan Musō Shinden-ryū Iaido.
- Karunakaran R. Chindan (1943–2016) – Malaysia Menkyo SMR
  - Student of Takaji Shimizu and Donn F. Draeger

== Footnotes ==
- ^a The names Shintō and Shindō, as used in Shintō Musō-ryū, are both equally correct. Different SMR-groups use the name Shintō or Shindō depending on their own tradition, no sort of consensus has been made as to which name should be used.
- ^b Competitions are held in Seitei Jodo only. Seitei Jodo holds competitions on which the performance of the uchidachi and shidachi are judged when performing kata. Shintō Musō-ryū holds no competitions of any sort.'
- ^c The name "Kasumi" Shintō-ryū is not the universal way of naming the 12 sword kata. The discovery of the name "Kasumi" was made from recent research into the history of Shintō Musō-ryū but is yet to be confirmed. The most common and older way of naming the 12 sword kata in SMR is "Shintō-ryu kenjutsu".
- ^d The number of headmasters is counted by combining all the known headmasters of all the branches of Shintō Musō-ryū Jōdō including the founder of Katori Shintō-ryū, the latter which the founder of SMR also held a Menkyo Kaiden, and Matsumoto Bizen-no-kami, the founder of the Kashima school that Musō Gonnosuke also trained in.

== Acronyms used in text ==
- SMR = Shintō Musō-ryū
- TSKR = Tenshin Shoden Katori Shintō-ryū

== See also ==
- Bujutsu/Budō – The "Way of War" or the "Way of the warrior". Both terms are used interchangeably to refer to both the warrior arts and their ideals.
- Daimyō – Samurai who were the feudal aristocratic landowner of feudal Japan. They employed other samurai as warriors and personal retainers in a vassal/lord relationship to both protect and expand the Daimyōs domains before and during the Sengoku Jidai period. The Daimyō title was abolished along with the Samurai and the feudal system in the Meiji restoration. Former Daimyō would instead become part of the new nobility of Japan.
- Iaido/Iaijutsu – Martial Art – The art of drawing the Japanese sword.
- Koryū – A modern (Western) term, Koryu is used to describe Japanese martial arts created before the 1876 banning of the samurai sword. Any art that was created post-1876, such as Judo, Karate, Aikido, Taidō, are considered to be Gendai budō. Karate, although preceding 1876, does not qualify as koryū due to the fact it did not evolve in Japan but on the Ryūkyū Islands (modern Okinawa Prefecture) which did not become a part of Japan until the 17th century.
- Samurai – The warrior elite of feudal Japan. The Samurai caste was abolished in the Meiji restoration's aftermath.
  - Ashigaru – Originally the conscripted footsoldiers of Samurai-armies, after Tokugawa came into power they became professional soldiers and the lowest ranking samurai.

== Other ==
Other martial arts schools from the Kuroda dominated Fukuoka Domain.

- Ise Jitoku Tenshin-ryū
- Jigo Tenshin-ryū
- Shiten-ryū (Hoshino-ha)
- Sosuishi ryu
- Takenouchi Santo-ryū
