= Jittejutsu =

Japanese martial art involving a jitte

Jittejutsu (十手術)
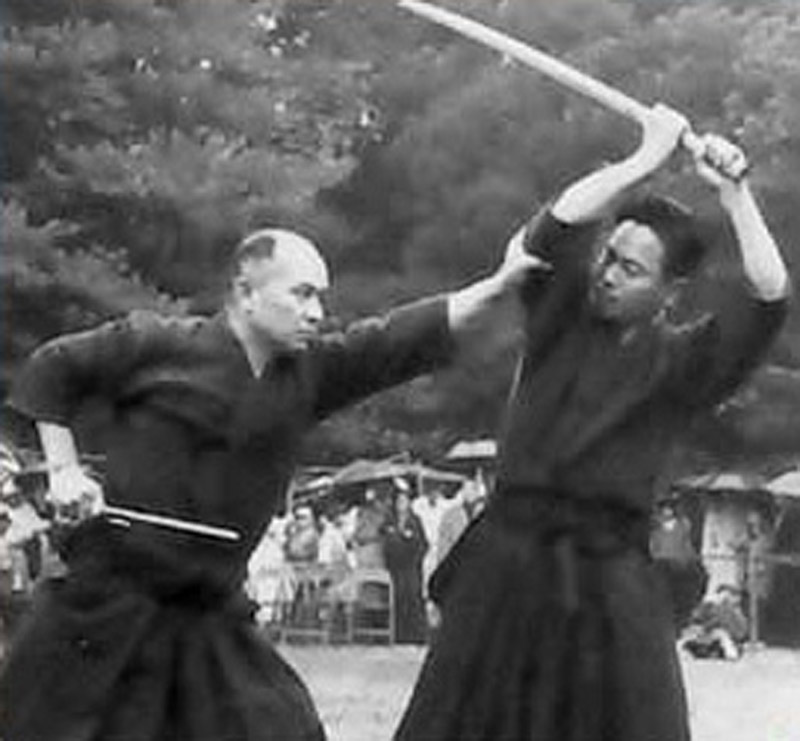
- Kuroda Ichitaro and Kaminoda Tsunemori of Shintō Musō-ryū performing Ikkaku-ryū juttejutsu
- Focus: Weaponry (jitte)
- Hardness: non-competitive
- Country of origin: Japan
- Creator: unknown
- Parenthood: historic
- Olympic sport: no

Jittejutsu (十手術) is the Japanese martial art of using the Japanese weapon jitte (also known as jutte in English-language sources). Jittejutsu was evolved mainly for the law enforcement officers of the Edo period to enable the non-lethal disarmament and apprehension of criminals wielding a sword. Besides the use of striking an assailant on the head, wrists, hands and arms like that of a baton, the jitte can also be used for blocking, deflecting and grappling a sword in the hands of a skilled user.

There are several schools of jittejutsu today and various jitte influences and techniques are featured in several martial arts.

== See also ==
- Ikkaku-ryū juttejutsu, a school of jittejutsu featured exclusively in the martial arts school Shintō Musō-ryū
