= Kasumi Shintō-ryū Kenjutsu =

Kasumi Shinto-ryū^{[note a]}
- Ko-ryū

Foundation
- Founder: Musō Gonnosuke Katsuyoshi^{[note b]} (夢想權之助勝吉)
- Date founded: c.17th century
- Period founded: Mid Edo period

Current information
- Current headmaster: No single headmaster

Arts taught
- Art: Description
- Kenjutsu: Art of the sword

Ancestor schools
- None identified

Descendant schools
- None identified

Kasumi Shintō-ryū Kenjutsu (霞神道流剣術), or (Shintō-ryū Kenjutsu), is one of the names used to describe the collection of sword-versus-sword training-forms (kata) for the long and short sword found exclusively in the Japanese martial arts system Shintō Musō-ryū (SMR). The system comprises 12 standing forms, 8 of which are for the longsword (Odachi) and 4 with the short sword (kodachi).

== History ==
The core of the Shinto Muso Ryu system has two elements, the jojutsu training forms and the twelve kenjutsu training forms. The origin of these kenjutsu forms are not clear other than it was a part of SMR from the beginning of the tradition, unlike the assimilated arts of Uchida-ryu, Ikkaku-ryu, Ittatsu-ryu and Isshin-ryu. Before creating the SMR, the founder, Muso Gonnosuke, had extensive training and experience in other martial arts. He received a Menkyo Kaiden, a license of complete transmission, in the Tenshin Shoden Katori Shinto Ryu tradition and he was said to have mastered secret techniques derived from the Kashima lineage of martial arts tradition.

Up until the mid-19th century there seems to have been no known name for the tradition, it simply being referred to as "8 longsword and 4 short sword forms". The tradition came to be known as Shintō-ryū kenjutsu in the mid-19th century by research made into the history of SMR by the SMR-practitioner Umezaki Chukichi.

The discovery of the name "Kasumi" Shintō-ryū was made from recent research by the SMR-practitioner Kaminoda Tsunemori, a direct student of Shimizu Takaji and leader of the Nihon Jodokai-group. This research has not yet been verified by independent sources, but the Kasumi designation has been used within Kaminoda's own organization to label the 12 kenjutsu forms. The name Shintō-ryū and Kasumi Shintō-ryū is used interchangeably among the various SMR-Jodo organizations and no consensus has been made on which name is to be used.

== The 12 forms of Kasumi Shintō-ryū Kenjutsu ==
The forms as given in Pascal Krieger's book Jodô - la voie du bâton / The way of the stick :

1. Ai sun (Yu) (相寸 右)
2. Ai sun (Sa) (相寸 左)
3. Jū (鷲)
4. Chi barai (乳拂)
5. Sarin (左輪)
6. Uke kaeshi (受返)
7. Nitō ai (二刀合)
8. Suri komi (摺込)
9. Inchū (咽中)
10. Uke nagashi (受流)
11. Miuke dome (三受留)
12. Tsuki dashi (突出)

== Footnotes ==
- ^ Note a:The name "Kasumi" Shintō-ryū is not the universal way of naming the 12 sword kata. The discovery of the name "Kasumi" Shinto-ryu was made from recent research into the history of Shintō Musō-ryū but is yet to be confirmed. The most common and older way of naming the 12 sword kata in SMR is "Shintō-ryū".
- ^ Note b:The true origin of the 12 kenjutsu forms is still not fully explored. Most likely the originator of the forms was Muso Gonnosuke, the creator of the Shintō Musō-ryū tradition.
