= Ikkaku-ryū juttejutsu =

Japanese Traditional School

Ikkaku-ryū (一角流)
- Ko-ryū
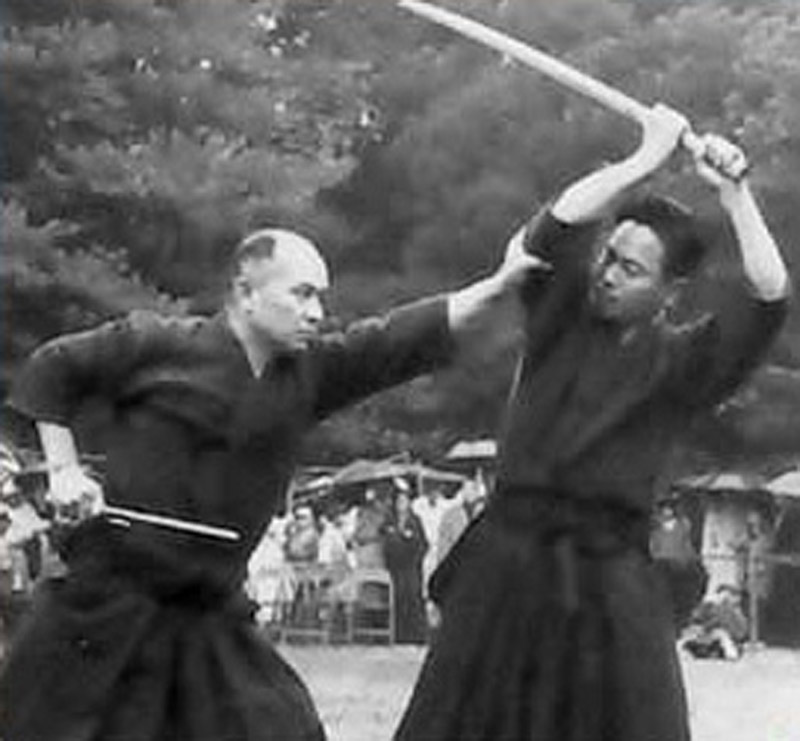
- Kuroda Ichitaro (left) and Kaminoda Tsunemori (right) performing Ikkaku-ryu Juttejutsu

Foundation
- Founder: Matsuzaki Kinu'emon Tsunekatsu
- Date founded: fl. 17th century
- Period founded: Mid-to-late Edo period

Current information
- Current headmaster: No single headmaster

Arts taught
- Art: Description
- Juttejutsu: Art of the forked baton
- Tankenjutsu: Art of the dagger

Ancestor schools
- N/A

Descendant schools
- N/A

Ikkaku-ryū juttejutsu (c. 一角流十手術) is a school of juttejutsu (or jittejutsu) that, as the equivalent to its sister variant Chūwa-ryū tankenjutsu (中和流短剣術), is taught alongside traditional school (ko-ryū) of Japanese martial arts, Shintō Musō-ryū. It is composed of 24 forms (kata) divided into two series. It was created by the third Shintō Musō-ryū (SMR) Headmaster, Matsuzaki Kinu'emon Tsunekatsu in the late 17th century.

Ikkaku-ryū juttejutsu utilizes the jutte as a way of self-defense for use against an attacker armed with a sword (katana).

== History ==
The original tradition of Ikkaku-ryū did not specialize in the jutte, but was a system of seizing/capturing arts (toritejutsu) with the jutte being one of several weapons and skills used. These weapons and arts included the war-fan (tessen), grappling (jujutsu), short-stick (tebō) and short-sword (kodachi). Originally the complete Ikkaku-ryū was taught in the New Just (Shintō) Musō-ryū branch and the Ten'ami-ryū as an arresting/seizing-system for the local security force of the Kuroda domain. After the Meiji restoration the two largest surviving branches of the Kuroda-no-jo tradition, Jigyo and Haruyoshi -branches of New Just (Shintō) Musō-ryū, was merged and streamlined into what would become the modern day Way of the Gods (Shintō) Musō-ryū system led by Shiraishi Hanjiro. Of the original seizing-arts of the Ikkaku-ryū only the jutte and tessen arts was incorporated into the new system.

== The Jutte and tessen ==
The (jutte) is a baton made of iron with a small tine or prong fitted just above the handle. The gripspace of the handle is wrapped with a cord that hangs down from underneath the handle with a tassle at the end. The jutte was mainly used by police-forces of the Edo-period of Japan and is known to have had over 200 variations.

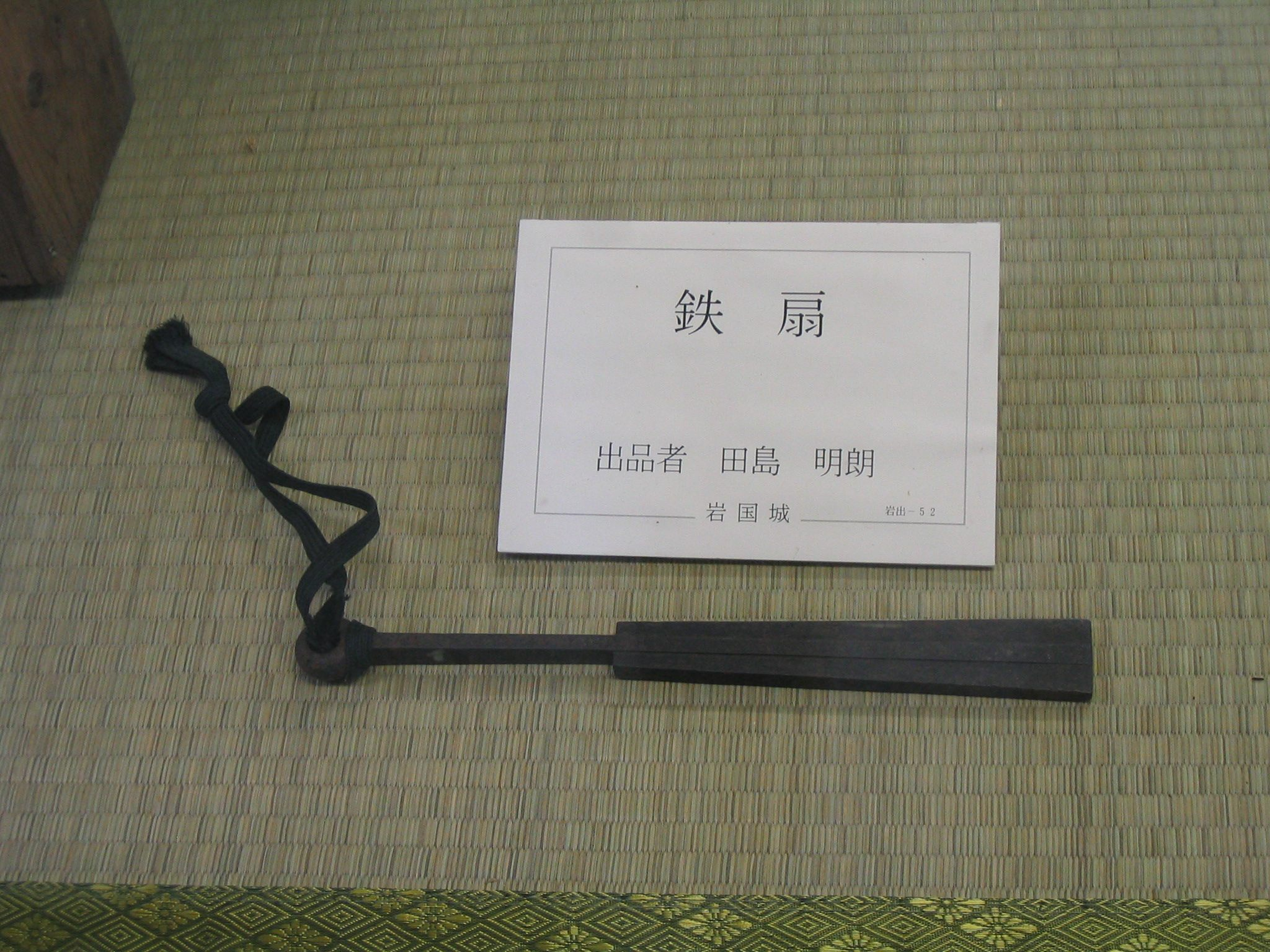
A typical tessen of the Edo-period (1603–1868). This weapon is used in tandem with the jutte in some forms of Ikkaku-ryu

Ikkaku-ryū fields a truncheon about 45 cm in length with a weight of about 550 grams. It has a smooth shaft ending in a handle wrapped in a coloured cord ending with a hanging tassel. A small tine is attached just above the grip. Originally the colour of the wrapping-cord indicated the social level of the wielder. The original design of the Ikkaku-ryū jutte had a hexagonal shaft cross-section with the tine attached to one of the corners instead of the flat surface. The inside of the tine was also sharpened which enabled the wielder to use it for cutting if applicable.

The fan (tessen) used in Ikkaku-ryū is about 30 cm in length. The fan was designed to look like a regular folding-fan carried by samurai and other nobles in the samurai-era when they did not have access to their swords. These special tessens were in some cases either made totally of iron or had iron-edges thus enabling it to be a small self-defence weapon if required.

== Jutte methods ==
Ikkaku-ryū applies the jutte, either alone or in tandem with the tessen, in response of an attack made by a swordsman armed with a katana. The jutte is made of iron and it can block and parry swordattacks either on its own or in tandem with the tessen. The jutte can be used to catch a sword between the main shaft and the tine thus controlling the sword or even snapping it in two if applicable. After deflecting or avoiding the sword, the wielder gets within arms-length of the opponent in order to successfully strike at any part of the opponents body such as hands, wrists and head.

== Training ==
The jutte is for the most part taught only to advanced students who have achieved a high level of proficiency in the Shinto Muso-ryu Jodo forms, though the level required is not standardized and different Jodo-organisations have different requirements. Modern exponents of Ikkaku-ryū normally use all-wooden weapons in order to reduce risk of injuries during training, though this is heavily dependent on which Jodo-organisation he/she belongs to. In some groups, when a student has attained the necessary level of skill, the wooden-jutte is replaced by a real one made of metal, and the attackers wooden-sword is replaced by a metal non-sharpened sword (iaitō). The tessen is normally made of wood for safety-reasons even in advanced levels as the tessen is discarded in some of the forms and can present a risk when thrown.

== Ikkaku-ryū jutte forms ==
The modern Ikkaku-ryū system fields 24 training-forms (kata) divided between 2 series called Omote and Ura. Some of the kata uses a war fan (Tessen) in tandem with the jutte. The forms of the Omote and Ura-series share the same name but are different in application.

Omote series

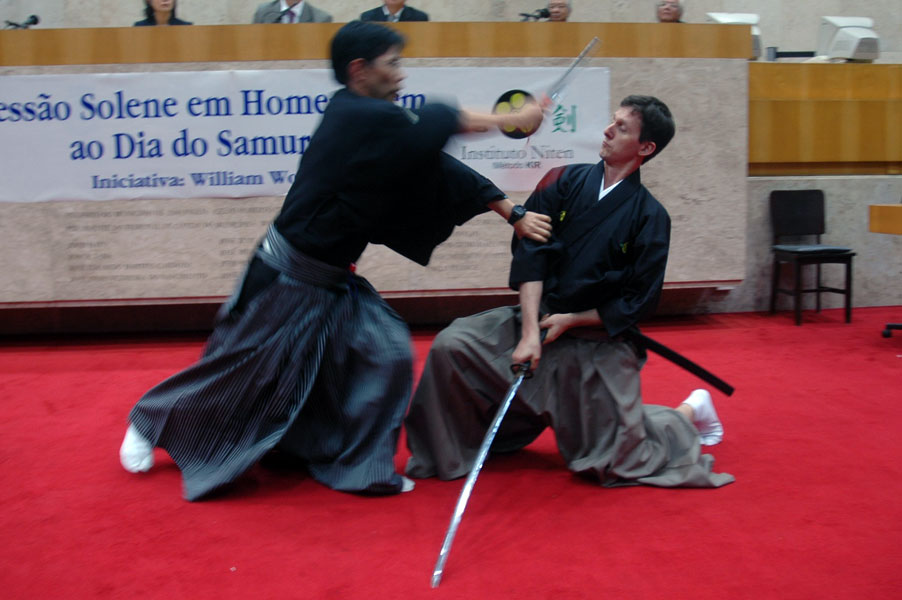
Irimiken Omote

1. Uken (右劍)
2. Saken (左劍)
3. Zanken (殘劍)
4. Keageken (蹴上劍)
5. Ichiranken (一亂劍)
6. Irimiken (入身劍)
7. Ippuken (一風劍)
8. Meateken (目當劍)
9. Utoken (右刀劍)
10. Gorinken (五輪劍)
11. Isseiken (一聲劍)
12. Kasumiken (霞劍)

Ura series

- (Identical names and number of forms as the Omote-series)
1. Uken (右劍)
2. Saken (左劍)
3. Zanken (殘劍)
4. Keageken (蹴上劍)
5. Ichiranken (一亂劍)
6. Irimiken (入身劍)
7. Ippuken (一風劍)
8. Meateken (目當劍)
9. Utoken (右刀劍)
10. Gorinken (五輪劍)
11. Isseiken (一聲劍)
12. Kasumiken (霞劍)

== See also ==
- Edo period
- Jittejutsu
- Tokugawa shogunate – The military dictatorship of the Tokugawa family that dominated Japan for the duration of the Edo period
