= Musō Gonnosuke =

Early 17th century samurai

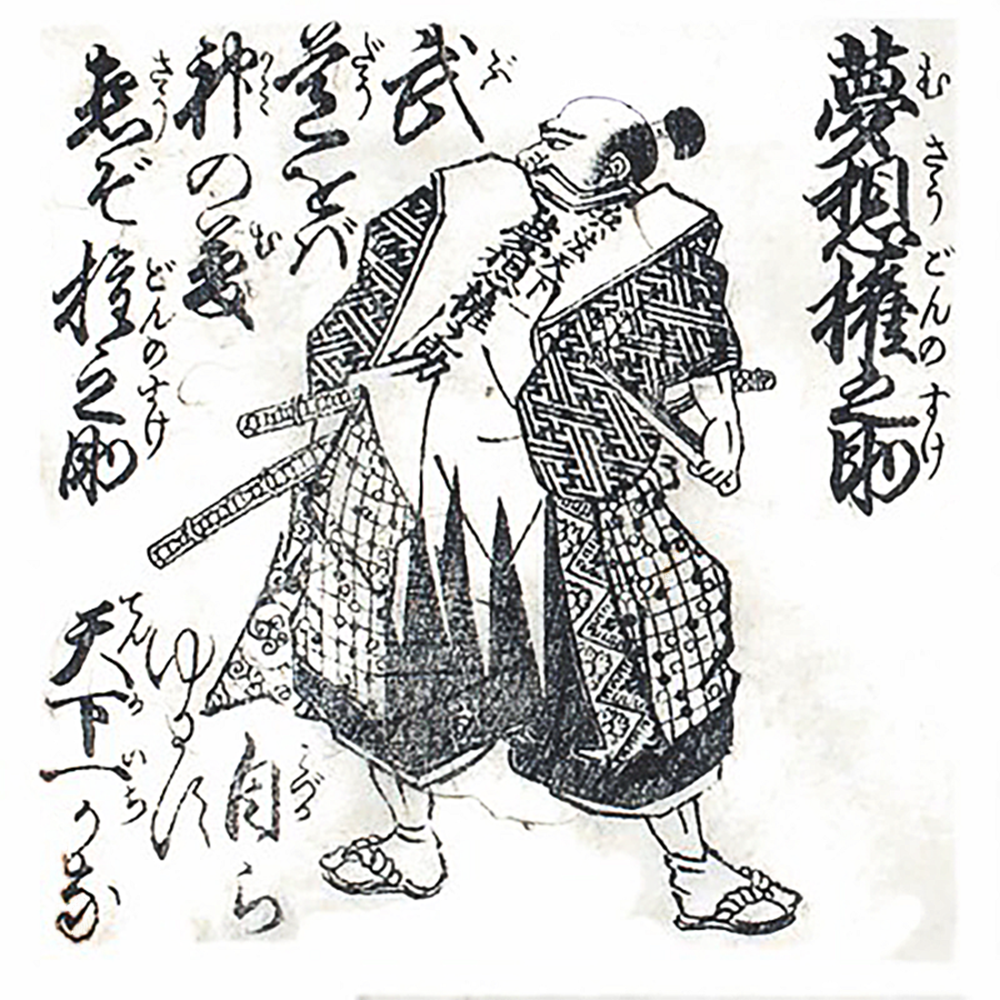
Muso Gonnosuke Katsuyoshi (from the Buko Hyakunin Isshu).

Musō Gonnosuke Katsuyoshi (夢想權之助勝吉) was a samurai of the early 17th century and the traditional founder of the Koryu school of jojutsu known as Shintō Musō-ryū (神道夢想流/神道無想流). He engaged in two duels with the legendary swordsman Miyamoto Musashi, although the second duel's occurrence is disputed.

== Traditional origin ==
Musō Gonnosuke Katsuyoshi was born into a samurai family, and like many other famous samurai and martial art founders, claimed to trace their lineage to a family of the classical period of samurai. His family is supposedly descended from Kiso Kanja No Taiyu Kakumei , a retainer of the famous samurai general Minamoto Yoshinaka. Gonnosuke's original family name is said to have been Hirano and that he used his given name of Gonbei in his early days. Unlike his future counterpart, Miyamoto Musashi, Gonnosuke was not a rōnin (masterless samurai) through a defeat in battle such as is claimed with Musashi in the battle of Sekigahara, but had gone out on the road on a warrior pilgrimage to improve his skills in duels and by learning from different martial arts schools on the road. This was a common tradition called musha shugyō and many samurai wishing to develop their martial abilities undertook such travels frequently. Musashi had probably been a part of the losing side in the Battle of Sekigahara in 1600 and had since been a rōnin and undertaking his own musha shugyō.

== Early life on the road ==
The Shintō Musō-ryū legacy (densho) 伝書 contains a written heritage of the school, and also includes a list of the former headmasters, including the founder, and a list of the jōdō techniques. It also lists several of Musō Gonnosuke's teachers in martial arts, one of whom, according to the Makabei family records, was Sakurai Osumi-no-Kami, a lieutenant of Makabei Hisamoto (nicknamed Oni Doumu), who in turn was a student of the founder of Kasumi Shintō-ryū Kenjutsu. Gonnosuke also received other training from the Tenshin Shōden Katori Shintō-ryū-school, founded by Iizasa Choisai Ienao, and also that he received training in either Kashima Shintō-ryū or Kashima Shinden Jikishinkage-ryū, depending on the source. In addition to learning the ken (sword), he learned to use the bo (long staff), naginata (pole weapon), yari (spear) and various other weapons. Gonnosuke eventually received the rank of menkyo, a complete license with the authority to train and develop the art, from Katori Shintō-ryū.

Sometime after he finished his training in Katori Shintō-ryū, Gonnosuke went out on the road, traveling through Japan with a few followers as a wandering swordsman, always looking for an opponent to fight duels with and at the same time teaching swordsmanship to a selected few. It is claimed that he defeated many of Japan's finest warriors, and remained undefeated until he encountered the rōnin Miyamoto Musashi.

== His first duel with Miyamoto Musashi ==
The first of the two legendary duels between Musashi and Gonnosuke was supposed to have taken place between 1596 and 1614. Scholars argue as to when and where the actual duel took place, and indeed some question whether it even took place at all. The essence of the story, however, tells of how Gonnosuke, by now a very famous swordsman and arrogant in his (considerable) martial abilities, had one day encountered Musashi and had unceremoniously challenged him to a duel. Musashi accepted and Gonnosuke, brandishing his sword, immediately threw himself at Musashi who with ease avoided Gonnosuke's strike and proceeded to lock Gonnosuke's sword, using both his long and short sword, in an X-shaped block (jujidome).

The Annals of the Niten (Niten ki), the traditional source of information for Miyamoto Musashi, tells this version of the first duel.

"While Musashi was in Edo, a man named Musō Gonnosuke came, looking for a match. Gonnosuke was armed with a bokutō (wooden sword). At the moment, Musashi had a willow bow, but he immediately took up a stick to confront Gonnosuke. Without even a nod, Gonnosuke attacked. Musashi struck him down in one stroke. Thwarted, Gonnosuke quit."

The details of exactly what happened in the duel are debated and still unclear. In the version found in the Kaijo monogatari, Gonnosuke and Musashi meets in Akashi instead of Edo, and the former is also brandishing a long four shaku staff instead of a wooden sword. It states that Gonnosuke had previously encountered Musashi's father, Shinmen Munisai, who was an expert of the jitte and had defeated him. Gonnosuke, in a condescending tone of voice, asked Musashi if he was as skilled as his father and if he used similar techniques. Musashi supposedly said: "If you have seen my father's technique you have seen mine", after which Gonnosuke attacked Musashi and was defeated.

The weapons used are also a subject of debate. Some accounts claim Gonnosuke was using a long staff (bo) reinforced with metal rings. Other versions claim he used an exceptionally long wooden sword which was above the average length of a Japanese sword over four shaku 1 long, (roughly 121 cm or 48 inches), instead of the normal length bokuto of around 2.45 Shaku (roughly 74 cm or 29 inches). Musashi's weapon of choice is also debated. One version say he was armed with only a half-finished bokuto, which Musashi was actually still carving as the duel began, and used it to overwhelm Gonnosuke without ever using the X-shaped block, instead hitting him lightly on the forehead as to demonstrate his superior stance in battle and emphasizing proper distance to an opponent, or Maai.

Because Gonnosuke did not expect to be bested with such ease, he withdraw to a Shinto monastery to contemplate his defeat.

== Seclusion, Jojutsu and the second duel ==
Gonnosuke withdrew to a Shinto shrine at Mount Hōman in Chikuzen province (modern-day Fukuoka Prefecture), where he would practice daily in perfecting his swordsmanship, praying and performing Shinto purifying rituals for 37 days. It is also said, however, that he spent several years on the road studying other martial arts in various dojos until he ended up at the Shinto shrine. After one of his regular (exhausting) training sessions, he collapsed from fatigue and reputedly had a vision of a divine being in the form of a child, saying to Gonnosuke: "know the solar plexus [of your opponent] with a round stick". In another version he had the vision in a dream late at night. He took it upon himself to create the jo deliberately longer than the average katana of the day, 128 cm, as opposed to the sword's total length of approx. 100 cm, and use that length to his advantage in a fight. Gonnosuke, drawing on his own considerable experience with the spear, longstaff, naginata and sword, devised a series of jo-techniques for use to counter and defeat a swordsman. Arguably, he also developed techniques to target Musashi's trade-mark X-block.

The outcome of the second duel, or even that a second duel occurred, is not conclusively known. The stick-fighting school he founded maintains that Gonnosuke, now armed with the jo, defeated Musashi through the use of the superior length of the jo to keep Musashi's swords out of range of Gonnosuke and thus hinder him from using the X-shaped technique effectively. Gonnosuke had Musashi at his mercy but let him live as a way of returning the favour granted in the first duel.

Outside of the stick-fighting schools, the claim that Musashi was ever defeated by Gonnosuke is denied, particularly by sword fighting schools who maintain Musashi was never defeated in a duel. The claim is generally treated skeptically as there is no record outside of the stick-fighting school that a second duel ever took place. Another version of the story says that Musashi and Gonnosuke went in a deadlock, and the match ended in a draw, as no one could move without making an opening.

== Later life and legacy ==
The story continues after the second duel. Gonnosuke, spending several more years on the road, part of the time with his new friend Musashi as his second, eventually took up residence in Fukuoka after being asked by the Kuroda clan to teach his jo-techniques to a selected few of their warriors. As the years progressed the original set of jo-techniques, by now expanded with new techniques since the days of Gonnosuke's duel with Musashi, became known as Shintō Musō-ryū (sometimes transliterated as Shindō Musō-ryū).

The modern day Shintō Musō-ryū survived both the ending of active fighting in Japan under the Tokugawa shogunate and the American-imposed post-World War II ban on martial arts; it is now an international martial art.

The memory of Musō Gonnosuke is honored at a Shinto shrine raised by Shimizu Takaji, one of the most prominent Shintō Musō-ryū jōdōka until his death in 1978.

== Sources for Musō Gonnosuke ==
The true origin of Gonnosuke is unknown; his traits and various exploits have, as with many martial artists and other famous samurai of the time, been exaggerated and/or constructed by later historians. A number of traditional founders of ryu, martial art school, have been credited with having divine inspirations or visions, or in some cases even being taught by mythical creatures. One example is the famous samurai Minamoto no Yoshitsune who was supposedly taught by a Tengu - magical creatures of Japanese mythology, some possessing vast knowledge of weapons and martial arts.

The earliest known source of the first duel is the Kaijo Monogatari. The entry in the Kaijo Monogatari was written in the 17th century but the exact year is debated. Author Kenji Tokitsu dates the Kaijo to 1666, but author Wayne Muromoto give the date of 1629. Another source is the Honcho Bugei Shoden (or Honcho Bugei Koden) written in about 1716. The sources agree on the core of the story however; that Gonnosuke faced Musashi and was defeated, after which he retreated and formed his jo-techniques. The notion that Musashi was defeated in a rematch can be argued to have been a later construct by later pro-Gonnosuke historians, as there is no mentioning of a defeat in the sources regarding Musashi. The same could be said, however, for Musashi's followers who might have removed all mentioning of Musashi's defeat as a way to preserve his reputation. Another mentioning of the first duel is found in the Niten-Ki which was compiled by Musashi's followers years after his death. There is only one known source mentioning the rematch. It is a scroll now preserved in Tsukuba Shrine in Ibaraki prefecture, although doubts of its contents has been raised, partially because there are no other known corroborating sources to confirm it.

== Musō Gonnosuke in popular culture ==
A fictional version of Musō Gonnosuke and his duels with Musashi are featured in the Eiji Yoshikawa's novel Musashi (novel).

In the video game "Mortal Kombat: Deadly Alliance", it is stated that Master Bo' Rai Cho helped Gonnosuke develop the Jojutsu style after his loss to Musashi. Bo' Rai Cho had used the Jojutsu style in "Mortal Kombat: Deception", "Mortal Kombat: Armageddon", and "Mortal Kombat: Deadly Alliance". It is also stated that Gonnosuke lost in his first "Mortal Kombat" tournament, and that his soul was consumed by Shang Tsung.

In the Wii video game Samurai Warriors: Katana, Gonnosuke is portrayed as a bandit chief that often uses henchmen to impersonate him in order to stay alive. After defeating him, the player will later encounter Gonnosuke who has become a changed man, and they both decide to work together to defeat Miyamoto Musashi in a duel. Gonnosuke also helps the player defeat a group of pirates invading a small town and the player must also beat Gonnosuke as part of the first trial of the Bamboo Trial.

Musō Gonnosuke is also featured within the manga series known as Vagabond, at which he declares himself to be the "Number One Martial Artist under Heaven" by means of the kanji written on his back (possibly punning his surname, as the kanji used are Tenka Musō). Gonnosuke later joins both Ino Tadaaki and Sasaki Kojiro in their journey of swordsmanship, vowing to become a master of the sword in accordance to the skill of his two pupils. In appearance, he wears face paint beneath his eyes and wields a spear.

== Footnotes ==
2. * This X-shaped block is called jūmonji (lit. cross) and is a fundamental technique of Musashi's Niten Ichi-ryū. When applying jūmonji, it is important to consider which of the two swords is atop the other. This will greatly influence what manner of countermove is appropriate.

== See also ==
- Seitei Jōdō - Modern, compact version of SMR with 12 kata taught in the Zen Nihon Kendō Renmei.
