= Gendai budō =

Umbrella term for modern Japanese martial arts

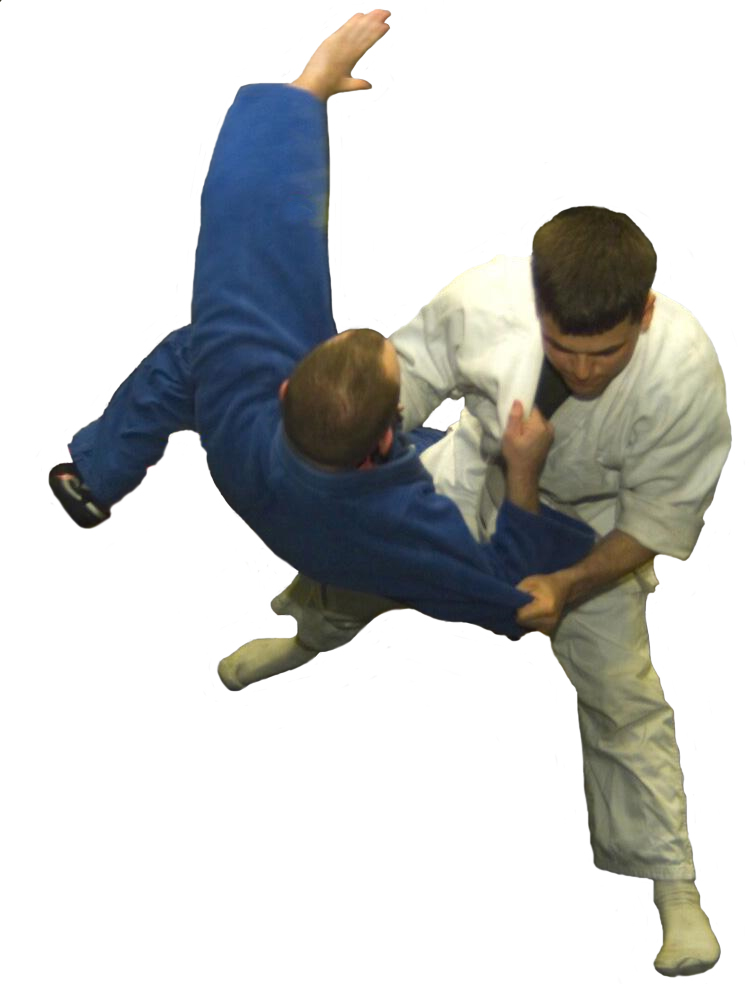
- Judo was one of the first modern martial arts.

Japanese name
- Kanji: 現代武道
- Hiragana: げんだいぶどう
Transcriptions
- Revised Hepburn: gendai budō

Gendai budō (Japanese: 現代武道; lit. 'modern budō'), or Shinbudō (新武道; new budō) are both terms referring to modern Japanese martial arts, which were established after the Meiji Restoration (1866–1869). Kobudō or koryū are the opposite of these terms referring to ancient martial arts established before the Meiji Restoration.

== Scope and tradition ==
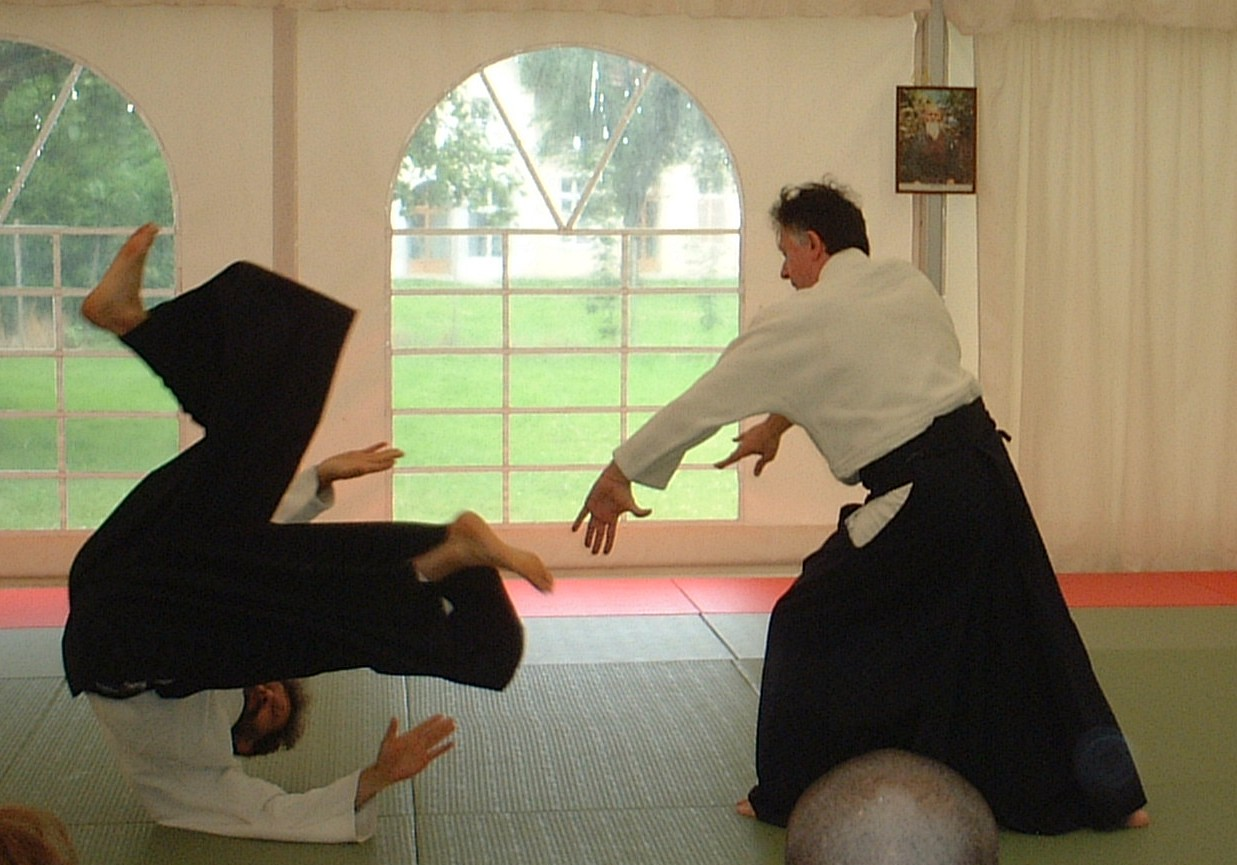
Aikido

Any martial art created after the Meiji Restoration of 1868 is Gendai Budō. Koryō Budō are schools of budō that predate 1868. Some examples of Gendai budō are aikido, fuji ryu Goshendo ju-jitsu, gendai goshin ju jitsu, judo, karate, kūdō and shorinji kempo. The Japanese art of sumo is often defined as a gendai budō. This definition is incorrect as sumo is an ancient art that has attained popularity and media coverage in the modern era.

Gendai budō have origins in koryū, the traditional Japanese martial arts. For example, Kano Jigoro (嘉納 治五郎 Kanō Jigorō, 1860–1938) founded judo in part as an attempt to systematize the myriad traditions of ju-jitsu which existed at the time. Kendo similarly derives from the many schools of kenjutsu that evolved over the centuries.

== Organization of ranking system ==
Koryū make no use of the popular kyu-dan ranking system. The gendai budō (modern budō forms), however, use the kyū-dan ranking system.

These rankings replaced the various certificates awarded within koryū. Gendai budō also generally do not contain the same strong entrance oaths and rituals as koryū, such as the keppan ("blood oath"). Whereas in most gendai budō dojo all are welcome provided they follow basic rules of conduct, koryū instructors often strictly scrutinize candidates. The primary purpose of gendai budō is for spiritual and mental development through the study and application of East Asian metaphysical techniques and teachings.
