= Hojōjutsu =

Japanese art of restraining person with rope

Hojōjutsu (捕縄術)
- hojōjutsu illustration
- Also known as: Torinawajutsu (捕縄術) or Nawajutsu (縄術)
- Focus: Weaponry
- Hardness: Non-competitive
- Country of origin: Japan
- Creator: unknown
- Parenthood: ancient
- Olympic sport: No

Hojōjutsu (捕縄術, lit. "restraining rope technique"), torinawajutsu (捕縄術, lit. "restraining rope technique") or just nawajutsu (縄術, lit. "rope technique") is the traditional Japanese martial art of restraining a person using cord or rope (called nawa (縄, "rope") in Japanese), as a precursor to modern-day handcuffs. Encompassing many different materials, techniques and methods from various schools, hojōjutsu is a classic Japanese art that is a unique product of Japanese history and culture.

As a martial arts practice, hojōjutsu is rarely if ever taught on its own, but as part of a curriculum under the aegis of the body of study encompassed by a larger school of bugei or budō, often as an advanced study in jujutsu. Regardless of the source, hojōjutsu techniques and methods are rarely demonstrated and disseminated outside Japan.

== Techniques and methods ==
Generally speaking, hojōjutsu can be divided into two broad categories. The first is the capture and restraint of a prisoner that was effected with strong, thin cord (usually 3–4 millimeters in diameter) called a hayanawa (早縄, lit. "Fast Rope"), and sometimes the sageo carried by samurai on the sword-sheaths was used. In law enforcement, this cord was carried by constables who secreted the rope in a small bundle that fed cord from one end. This torinawa ("capture-rope") was coiled so that the cord would pay out from one end as the bundled cord was passed around the prisoner's body, neck and arms as they were tied. This was usually accomplished by one constable in the course of performing an arrest while the prisoner was actively resisting and had to be achieved quickly.

Even at this stage, attention was still paid to visual and aesthetic concerns in the tying method as well as to the cultural needs of Japanese society. According to experts, an accused prisoner who has not been convicted would be tied using methods that allowed the prisoner to be securely restrained, but which contained no knots to save the prisoner the shame of being publicly bound. Instead of securing the tie with knots, the constable held on to the free end of the rope and walked behind the prisoner to keep him or her under control as the prisoner was taken for an interrogation, which could involve the application of one or more forms of judicial torture to elicit a confession.

The second category utilized with one or occasionally two "main ropes" or honnawa which, like the hayanawa, could be any one of many different lengths, but was typically hemp in material. The thickness of this rope averaged at six or more millimeters in diameter, while the length could be as much as 25 meters long. This was used to provide a more secure, long-term binding than is possible with the hayanawa for transportation to a place of incarceration, restraint at legal proceedings, and—in the case of particularly severe crimes—for the public display of the prisoner prior to execution by such methods as beheading, crucifixion (i.e., the prisoner was shown tied to a cross before spears were driven through the body), or, in arson convictions, death by fire.

Honnawa ties were applied by a group of people, usually not less than four, whose presence allowed the use of more intricate and ornate patterns than was the case with the hayanawa. Both forms combined effective restraint with a distinct visual aesthetic.

In either form, the hojōjutsu ties known today display a shrewd understanding of human anatomy through several recurrent themes. This can include leverage removal (tying limbs in positions that decrease the force they can generate), rope placement to discourage struggling or to make it less effective by placing one or more loops of rope around the neck and constricting restraint around points on the upper arms where determined struggle puts pressure on blood vessels and nerves, numbing the extremities.

== Persistence in modern times ==
Hojōjutsu shows limited survival in the modern world, both in Japan and elsewhere. Torinawa techniques are taught as part of the curriculum learned by modern Japanese police officers and it remains an advanced topic within schools of jujutsu, following it and other Japanese traditional martial arts as they make their way around the world from Brazil to Eastern Europe. Yoshida ha Shidare Yanagi ryū, art of the late Don Angier, contains an extensive hojōjutsu curriculum.

Although the honnawa techniques have long been supplanted by handcuffs and leg-irons, some teachers of traditional martial arts in Japan work to continue to maintain the art form. The sōke (head of, and heir to the style) of Masaki-ryū, Nawa Yumio, has written several books on the subject and has worked as a historical consultant on matters dealing with law enforcement. Mizukoshi Hiro's recently reprinted book Torinawajutsu offers historical background followed by thorough, practical instruction in more than 25 traditional ties, including some recreated from rare and old texts. The ko-ryū cited are Seigo Ryu Jujutsu, Seishin Ryu Jujutsu, Koden Enshin Ryu Iaijutsu, Nanbu Handen Hojo Jutsu, Kurama Yoshin Ryu Jujutsu, Nagano Ryu Heihou, Mitsuo (Mippa) Muteki Ryu, Bo Ryu and Tenfu Muso Ryu.

Seiko Fujita's work Zukai Torinawajutsu, which could be considered as the encyclopedia of this art, shows hundreds of ties from many different schools.

=== Japanese bondage ===
Japanese bondage was invented in the late Edo period (about 1600 to 1860s). Generally recognized as "father of Kinbaku", Seiu Ito, started studying and researching hojōjutsu and is credited with the inception of kinbaku; he also drew inspiration from other art forms of the time, including kabuki theatre and ukiyo-e woodblock prints.

== See also ==
- Bolas – Type of weighted throwing weapon used in South America
- Braid – Structure of strands of flexible material
- Cat's cradle – String figure game
- Child harness – Safety device worn by children
- Chinese knotting – Decorative handicraft art
- Ittatsu-ryū – School of hojojutsu Japanese martial art
- Jitte – Japanese non-bladed weapon
- Torimono sandōgu – Japanese pole weapons
- Knot – Method of fastening or securing linear material
- Kumihimo – Traditional Japanese artform of making cords and braids
- Lasso – Loop of rope used as restraint
- List of knots
- Macramé – Technique of knotting cords or thick yarns to make lace or fringe
- Marudai – Tool used in kumihimo braiding
- Mizuhiki – Traditional Japanese paper artform
- Rein – Straps used to direct a horse
- Surujin – Japanese throwing weapon
- Takenouchi-ryū – Japanese martial arts school
