= Budoshin Ju-Jitsu =

Contemporary style of ju-jitsu

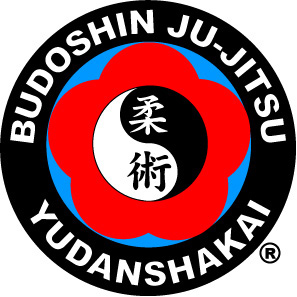
- Budoshin Ju-Jitsu Yudanshakai logo, worn by shodan (1st degree black belt) rank and above, incorporating yin-yang symbol within red lotus blossom
- Focus: Hybrid
- Country of origin: United States
- Date of formation: 1967
- Creator: George Kirby, Sanzo Seki, William Fromm
- Olympic sport: No
- Official website: budoshin.com

Budoshin is a contemporary style (ryū) of ju-jitsu rooted in ancient Japanese techniques, with an emphasis on practical self-defense.

Originating in the 2,500-year-old "parent" martial art of ju-jitsu, Budoshin incorporates newer martial ways such as judo (throws, sweeps, groundwork), aikido (leverage, momentum, pressure points, joint locks), and karate (kicks, blocks, strikes) to offer a varied fighting system.

Unlike Brazilian Ju-Jitsu (BJJ), Budoshin does not focus primarily on ground fighting and is not a sport, although some practitioners take part in tournaments featuring waza (technique) and kumite (sparring) competitions. George Kirby — author of instructional publications and Black Belt magazine's "Instructor of the Year" in 2007 — has been a key proponent of Budoshin since helping found and codify the style beginning in 1967.

== History ==
Budoshin originated in the teachings of Sanzo "Jack" Seki (1914–98), who was born in Los Angeles to a Japanese ju-jitsu master father and an Irish-American mother. While Seki was still young, his father sent him to Japan to study with Kanō Jigorō, an expert in Shinyo Tenjin Shin Ryu and Kitō-ryū ju-jitsu, but best known as the founder of modern judo, an Olympic sport that grew out of ju-jitsu. In addition, Seki studied ju-jitsu as taught by his father, moving back to the U.S. in the mid-1930s. He served as a weaponless self-defense instructor in the U.S. Army Air Forces during World War II, then settled in Southern California.

Seki founded ju-jitsu programs at the Burbank YMCA and Los Angeles Valley College in the 1960s. In the fall of 1967, he asked two of his students, George Kirby (1944-) and William Fromm (1935-2003), to take over the Burbank program and create an organization to promote the art.

Prof. Seki thought there was "only ju-jitsu" and questioned the need to distinguish styles of the art. Believing that naming the style would be valuable, however, Kirby and Fromm proposed "Budoshin", which means "to conduct oneself in a respectable, honorable manner". This was acceptable to Prof. Seki, as "Budoshin" reflected an appropriate attitude and philosophy rather than technical characteristics.

In the mid-1970s, Kirby also studied with Harold Brosious, founder of Ketsugo Ju-Jitsu. Although Prof. Brosious's approach to instruction was radically different from Prof. Seki's, many of his teachings were integrated into Budoshin. The ju-jitsu styles of Profs. Seki and Brosious have roots in 17th-19th century Japan. In 1974, William Fromm founded a Budoshin dojo in Maryland and established the art on the East Coast.

Starting in 1983 with the publication of George Kirby's Basic Techniques of Ju-Jitsu, the Gentle Art, Budoshin increased its formalization as a ryū. Eight more books on Budoshin have appeared since then, plus the Black Belt Budoshin Ju-Jitsu Home Study Course. In the 1980s, Budoshin emerged as a distinct style for two reasons: first, instructors, practitioners, and organizations had begun referring to it as a ryū; second, Budoshin had an established instructional approach, promotional procedure, and published materials that delineated the style.

== Techniques ==
Budoshin techniques enable practitioners to defend themselves by subduing assailants in varied contexts, and include throws, sweeps, joint locks, nerve attacks, punches, kicks, strangles, and chokes. Many core techniques that work from a standing position also work from the ground.

Budoshin students learn how to manipulate an assailant's pressure and balance points, with an explanatory book, Jujitsu Nerve Techniques: The Invisible Weapons of Self-Defense, appearing in 2001.

The style teaches defenses to knife, club, and gun attacks, as well as the use of improvised weapons and the traditional Japanese bō (long staff), jō (short staff), koshi-no-bo or yawara (short baton), and jutte or jitte (metal shaft with one guard). (Note: see Kirby's Jutte: Japanese Power of Ten Hands Weapon (1987)) Some Budoshin sensei with a background in Japanese swordsmanship instruct students in fundamental techniques of the bokken and katana to complement unarmed training.

Most dojos led by Budoshin instructors focus on a common core of essential kata (forms) and waza (techniques) for testing purposes, yet these are augmented by scores of additional techniques. Prof. Kirby's main treatise on Budoshin appeared in 2019 and lists over 800 distinct techniques: Densho, also known as the "Big Book".

The focus of Budoshin Ju-jitsu has always been on extreme practicality: If a technique works well for a given student in light of his training background and physiology, then the student is encouraged to make it part of his or her "tool-kit". Women are well-represented among Budoshin practitioners because the art enables them to defend against larger, stronger assailants.

Budoshin techniques can also be adapted for use by students with injuries or physical limitations. For example, it includes defenses that can be used from a sitting position (e.g., pressure-point attacks). The ryū enables practitioners to control the amount of pain applied when subduing an assailant to avoid injuring him unnecessarily (e.g., by using joint locks or nerve manipulation).

== Training Police and Private Security Firms ==
Prof. Kirby was asked to develop a defensive tactics program for the state of Nevada in the 1980s. In 1994, he was appointed Defensive Tactics Consultant for the Los Angeles Police Department, serving on its Civilian Martial Arts Advisory Panel.

== Budoshin Ju-Jitsu Yudanshakai ==
In 1994, the Budoshin Ju-Jitsu Yudanshakai (black belt association, abbreviated "BJJY") was established. The BJJY provides a central information source for students and offers those studying the art through the video series a way to measure progress.

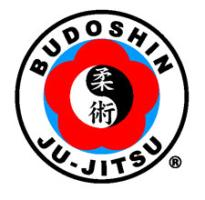
Budoshin Ju-Jitsu logo (all ranks)

== Philosophy ==
Budoshin is governed by a philosophy/code of ethics, to which all its practitioners are expected to adhere. Reflected in the meaning of Budoshin (honorable or respectable), the three primary tenets of the code are integrity, humility, and respect. Because serious or lethal injuries are possible, practitioners follow a philosophy of non-violence; bodily confrontations are avoided whenever possible, and all verbal or other methods of de-escalating conflicts are attempted before resorting to physical means.

== Regular Events ==
The major annual event of the ryū is Camp Budoshin, held in Santa Clarita, CA. This multi-day event includes seminars and a shiai (tournament) for all levels of practitioner. Regional tournaments focused on Budoshin are held throughout the U.S., usually once a year or more.

== Affiliated Organizations and Styles ==
All Budoshin practitioners join the American Ju-Jitsu Association (AJA), which was founded in 1972 to bring together different styles of the art in an atmosphere of cooperation and respect.

The AJA has many Budoshin practitioners with experience in other ju-jitsu styles, including American Combat Jujitsu, Daitō-ryū Aiki-jūjutsu, Danzan-ryū, Hakkō-ryū Jujutsu, Small Circle JuJitsu, and Taiho-jutsu, as well as in iaido, karate, and sambo.

Budoshin co-founder George Kirby is a Grandmaster of the World Head of Family Sokeship Council and a senior advisor to the Institute of Traditional Martial Arts.
