= Tatsumi-ryū =

Tatsumi-ryū Hyōhō (立身流兵法)
- Ko-ryū

Foundation
- Founder: Tatsumi Sankyo
- Date founded: Between 1504 and 1521
- Period founded: Eishō Era (1504–1521)

Current information
- Current headmaster: Hiroshi Kato

Arts taught
- Art: Description
- Kenjutsu: Sword art – long and short sword
- Iai: Art of drawing the sword – long sword
- Sōjutsu: Spear art
- Bōjutsu (within kenjutsu training): Long-staff (rokushaku bō, 1.81 meter staff)
- Naginatajutsu (within kenjutsu training): Glaive art
- Hanbō (within kenjutsu training): Short-staff (90 centimeters)
- Yawara (including katsu (活) and hojōjutsu): armored and un-armored grappling (including resuscitation and rope-tying)
- Shudan sentōhō (手段戦闘法): Esoteric charms, tactics
- Monomi (物見): Scouting, reconnaissance, and observation techniques

Ancestor schools
- None identified

Descendant schools
- Tatsumi Shin-ryū

Tatsumi-ryū Hyōhō (立身流兵法, Tatsumi-ryū Hyōhō) is a traditional school (koryū) of Japanese martial arts founded in the early 16th century by Tatsumi Sankyo.

== History ==
Tatsumi Sankyo was born in what is now Ehime Prefecture, Japan, on Shikoku island. He is thought to have been active as a warrior (bushi) in the Eishō Era (1504–1520). Tatsumi trained in the martial arts from an early age. As a result, he was never defeated, either on the battlefield or in single combat. As a young man, Tatsumi was dissatisfied with mere technical proficiency, or even victory in combat, and secluded himself in prayer to the mountain deity (kami) Tsumayama Daimyojin. Through intense ascetic training (修行, shugyō), Tatsumi gained enlightenment (satori) in the sword arts going beyond superficial levels of purely physical achievement. He then formulated the Tatsumi-ryū as a result of his experiences in light of his new understanding.

At the time of the Meiji Restoration, a number of well-known swordsmen were members of the Tatsumi-ryū. In particular was Henmi Sōsuke, the first head of the kenjutsu training unit of the post-feudal Tokyo Metropolitan Police Department. Yamaoka Tesshū, famous as a swordsman and calligrapher himself, said of Henmi Sosuke, 'Swordsmen are many, but only Henmi uses the true sword.' During that time period, several of the basic kata of the Tatsumi Ryu kenjutsu syllabus, the iai syllabus, and the yawara were adopted by the Metropolitan Police Office.

== Curriculum ==
Tatsumi-ryū is a martial art (総合武術, sōgō bujutsu), encompassing many of the classical martial and strategic skills of the martial artist (武芸者, bugeisha). The central weapon of Tatsumi-ryū is the katana, and training to use the sword in combat constitutes the largest part of the curriculum. The use of other weapons, such as the spear (yari), glaive (naginata), long staff (rokushaku-bō), and short staff (hanbō), is undertaken with the aim of enabling the swordsman to defeat such weapons. Indeed, the studies of naginata, rokushaku-bō, and hanbō are classified as part of the swordsmanship (kenjutsu) curriculum and are not considered as separate areas of study. Therefore, in the practice of pre-determined exercises with partners (kata) these weapons always "lose" to the sword.

The school also contains a large curriculum for unarmed grappling arts (which Tatsumi-ryū refers to as yawara, rather than jujutsu). The yawara syllabus includes training for combat both in and out of armour, and covers a wide range of techniques and situations. Also included in the yawara syllabus are the resuscitation techniques (活, katsu) and the art of restraining a person with rope-tying techniques (hojōjutsu). The curriculum includes also a number of weapons for which there are no kata, but which are referred to in Tatsumi-ryū's scrolls (makimono). This includes the baton (jutte), throwing blade (shuriken), iron fan (tessen), and weighted chain (manriki-gusari). These scrolls also include a number of "case studies" of various situations, esoteric charms, tactics (手段戦闘法, shudan sentōhō), and scouting, reconnaissance and observation techniques (物見, monomi), as well as an array of other teachings about different aspects of warrior culture and philosophy.

== Authorized teachers ==
During the Edo period, Tatsumi-ryū was widely practiced among the samurai of the Hotta clan's domain, which is centered on present day Sakura, Chiba. Today Hiroshi Kato (Kato Hiroshi, born 1944) is recognized as the 22nd grandmaster (sōke) of Tatsumi-ryū. Outside Japan, Liam Keeley, of Melbourne, Australia, is the only individual who both holds advanced teaching licenses (mokuroku) for Tatsumi-ryū as well as being an authorized teacher for Tatsumi-ryū. Pierre and Claire Simon (France) and Jaime Gamundi (Spain) are also authorized to teach the Tatsumi-ryū curriculum.
