= Kanabō =

Japanese weapon (war club)

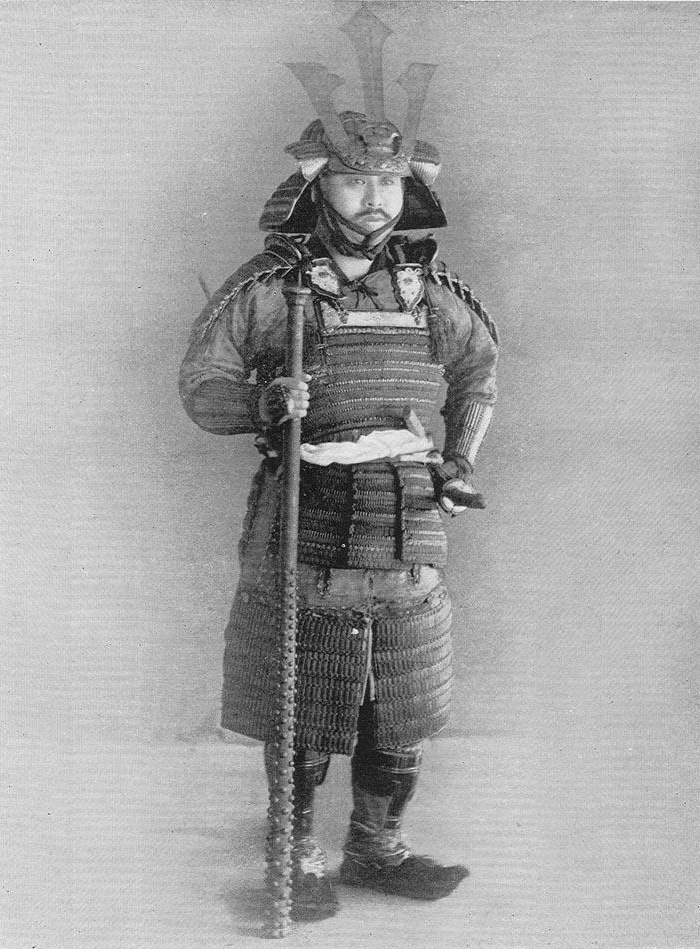
Samurai holding a kanabō

The kanabō (金砕棒, kanasaibō), lit. 'metal stick' or 'metal club', is a spiked or studded two-handed war club used in feudal Japan by samurai. Other related weapons of this type are the nyoibō, konsaibō, tetsubō (鉄棒), and ararebō. Related solid iron weapons with no spikes or studs are the kanemuchi (or kanamuchi) and the aribo (also known as a gojo or kirikobo).

== Description ==
Kanabō and other related club-like weapons were constructed out of heavy wood or made entirely from iron, with iron spikes or studs on one end. For wooden kanabō, one or both ends could be covered with iron caps. Kanabō-type weapons came in a wide variety of shapes and sizes; though the largest ones were as tall as a man, on average they measured roughly 140 cm in length. The kanabō was typically intended for two-handed use, though one-handed versions exist which are more usually referred to as tetsubō and ararebō.

Their shape could be similar to that of a medieval club or bludgeon, with a thicker outer end tapering towards a slender handle with a pommel, or, after the manner of a jō, they could be straight all the way from the handle to the end. The shaft cross-section could be round (as in a baseball bat) or polygonal; that is, multi-faceted with flat surfaces arrayed around the central axis.

== Mythology ==
The kanabō was also a mythical weapon, often used in tales by oni, who reputedly possessed superhuman strength. This is alluded to by the Japanese saying "like giving a kanabō to an oni"—meaning to give an extra advantage to someone who already has the advantage (i.e. the strong made stronger).

== Gallery ==
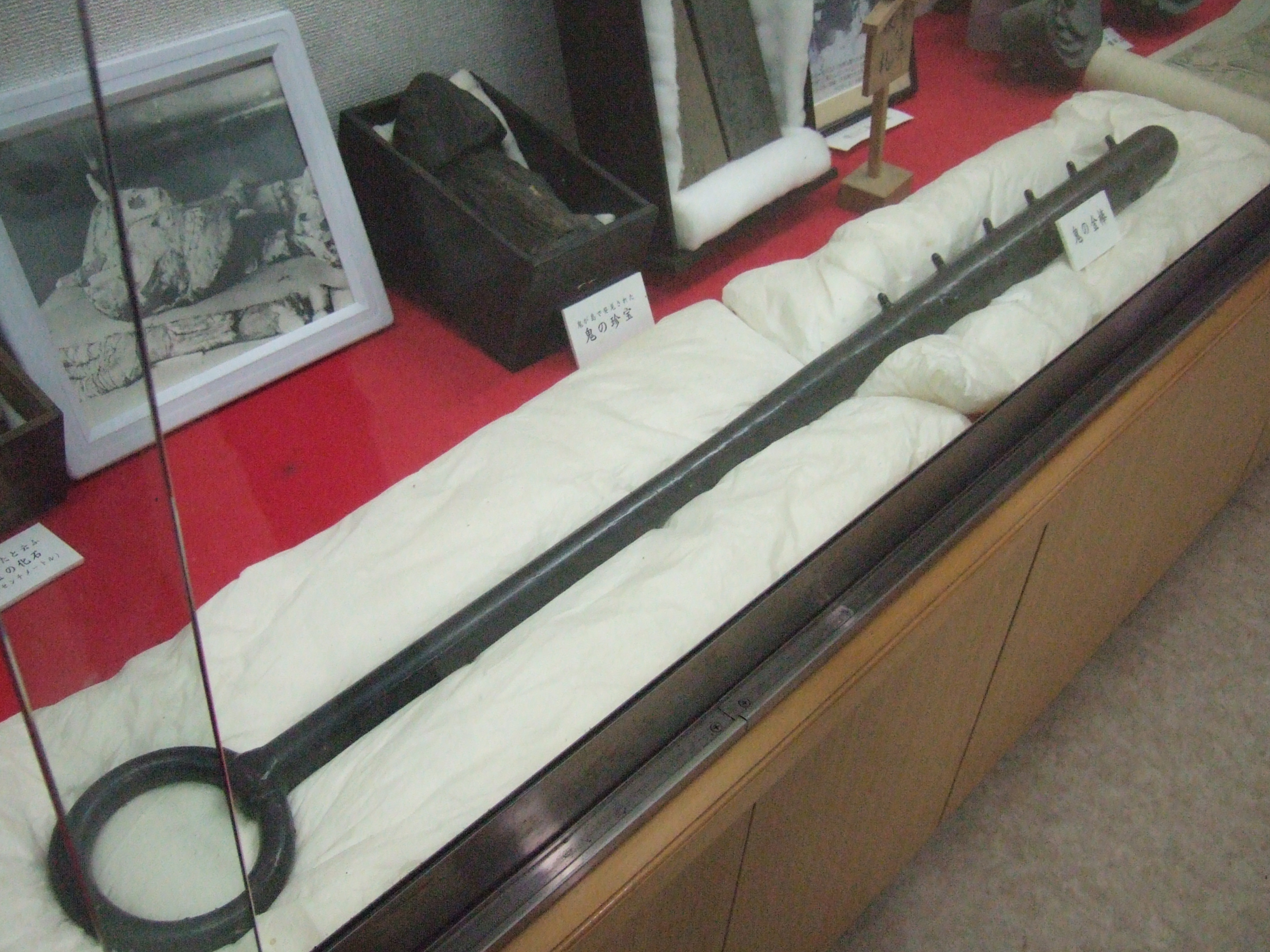
A kanabō

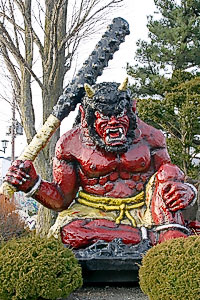
A statue of an oni armed with a kanabō

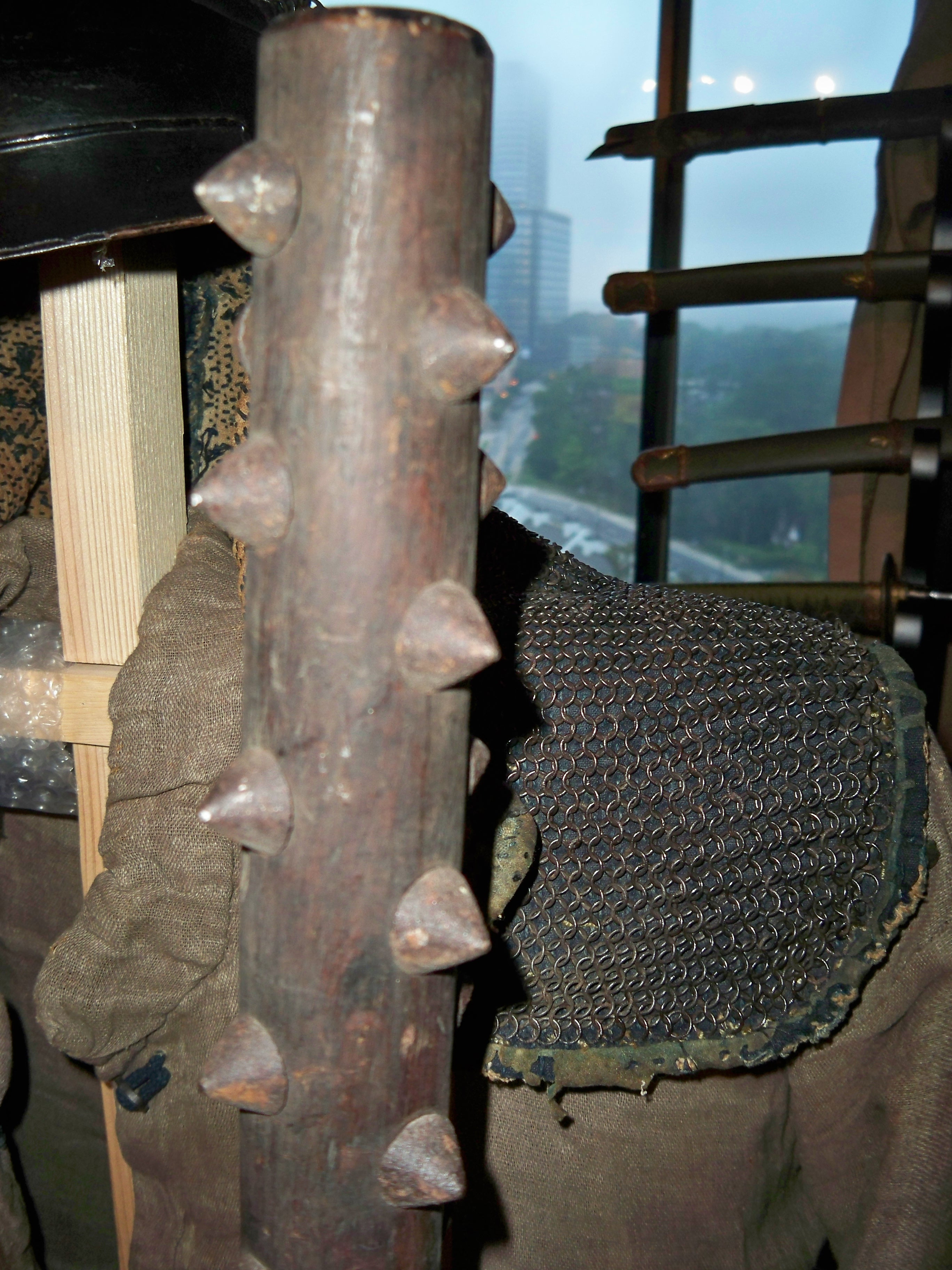
A close-up of the iron spikes of a tetsubō

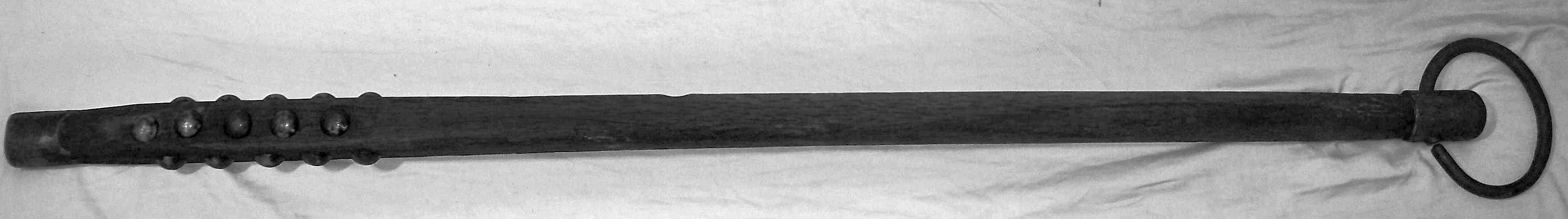
A Japanese kanabō

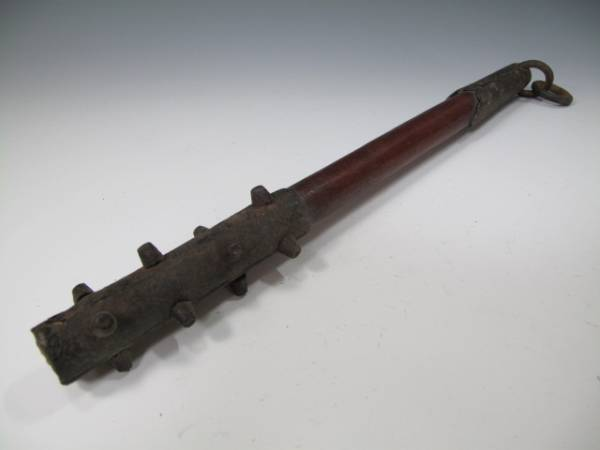
A small antique Japanese wooden club with iron-covered ends and iron studs (ararebō)

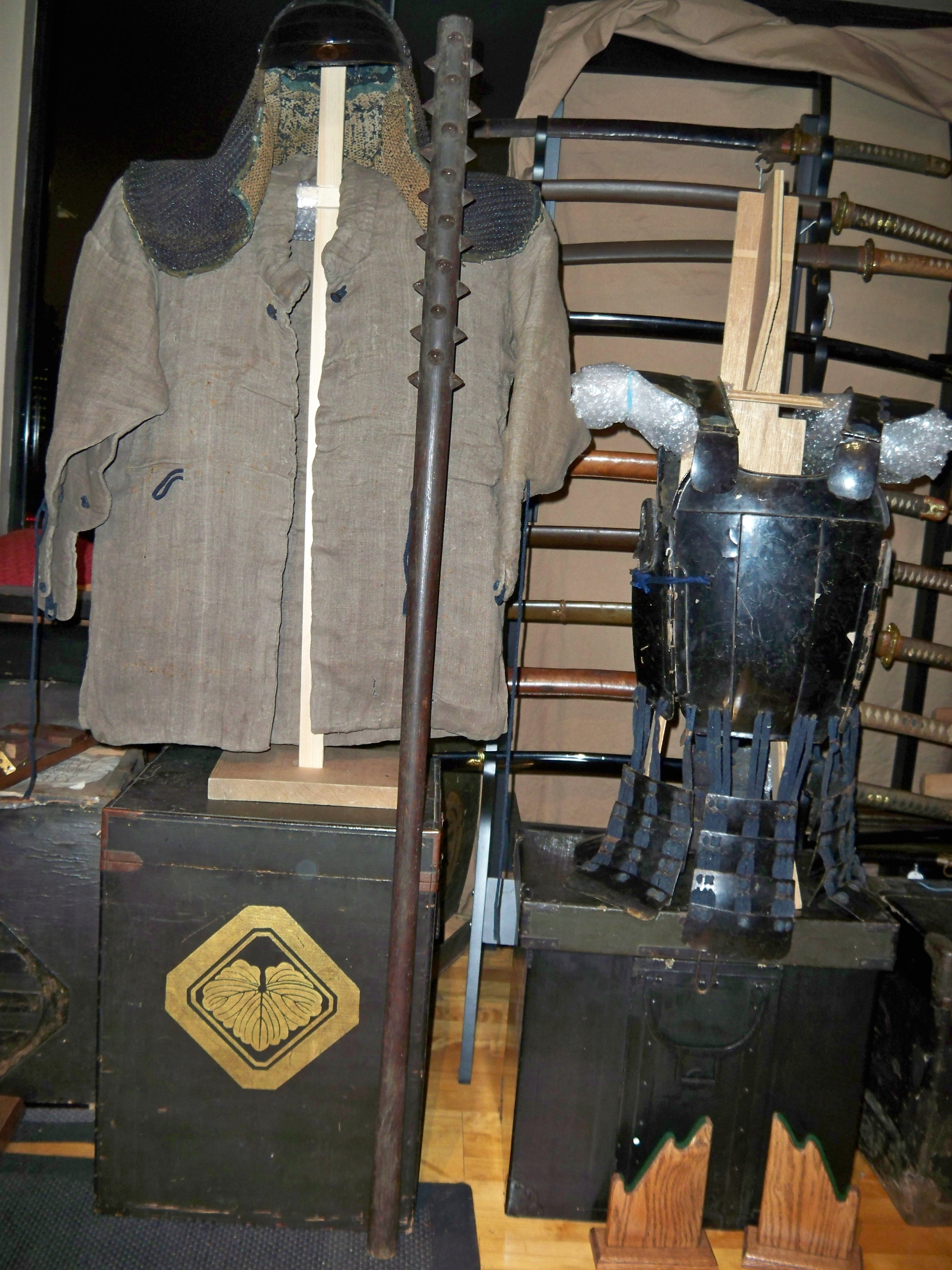
An old Japanese wood club with iron spikes (a kanabō or tetsubō), 4′ 9″ long and 4 lb (1.8 kg) in weight

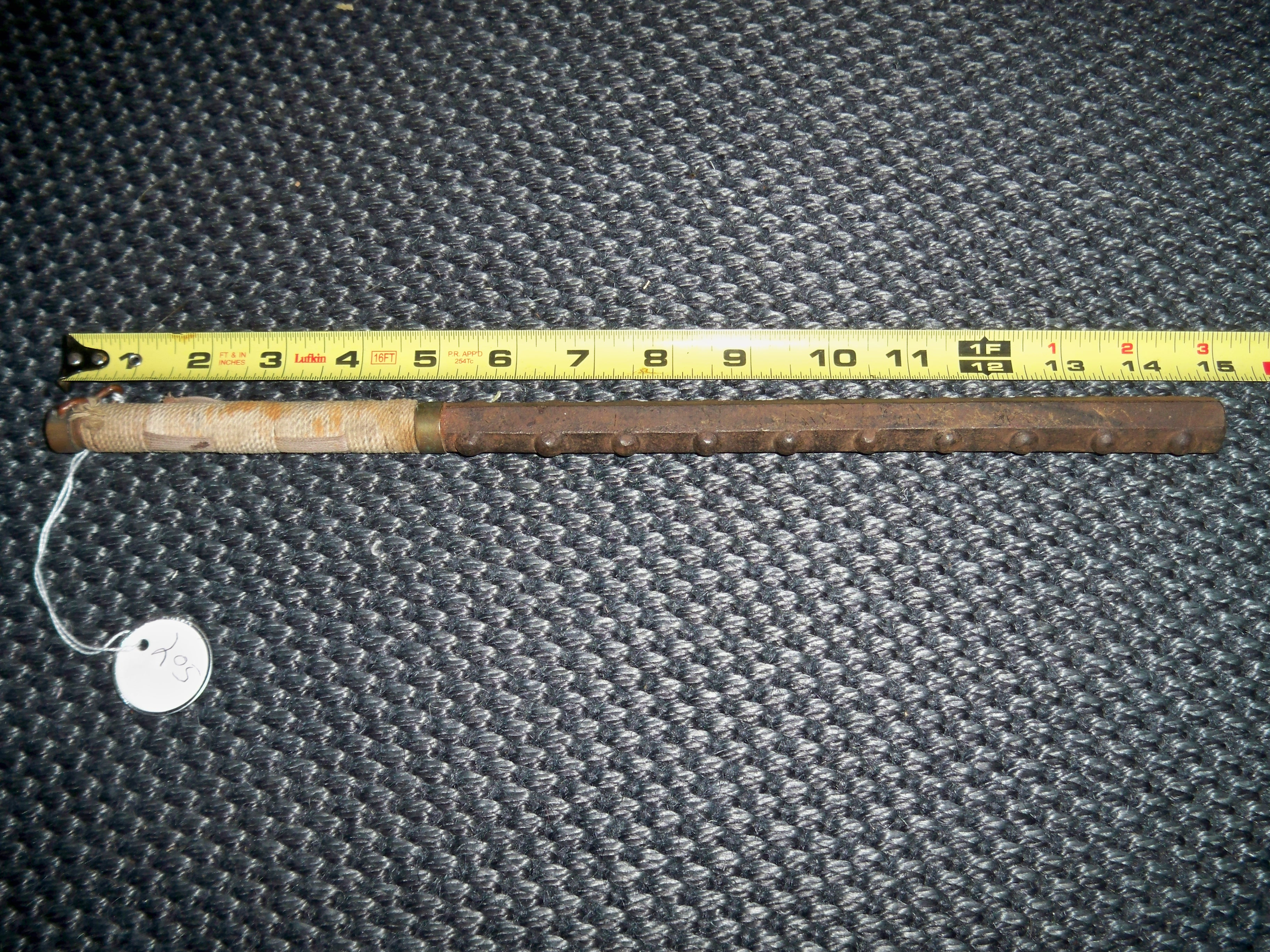
A small tetsubō

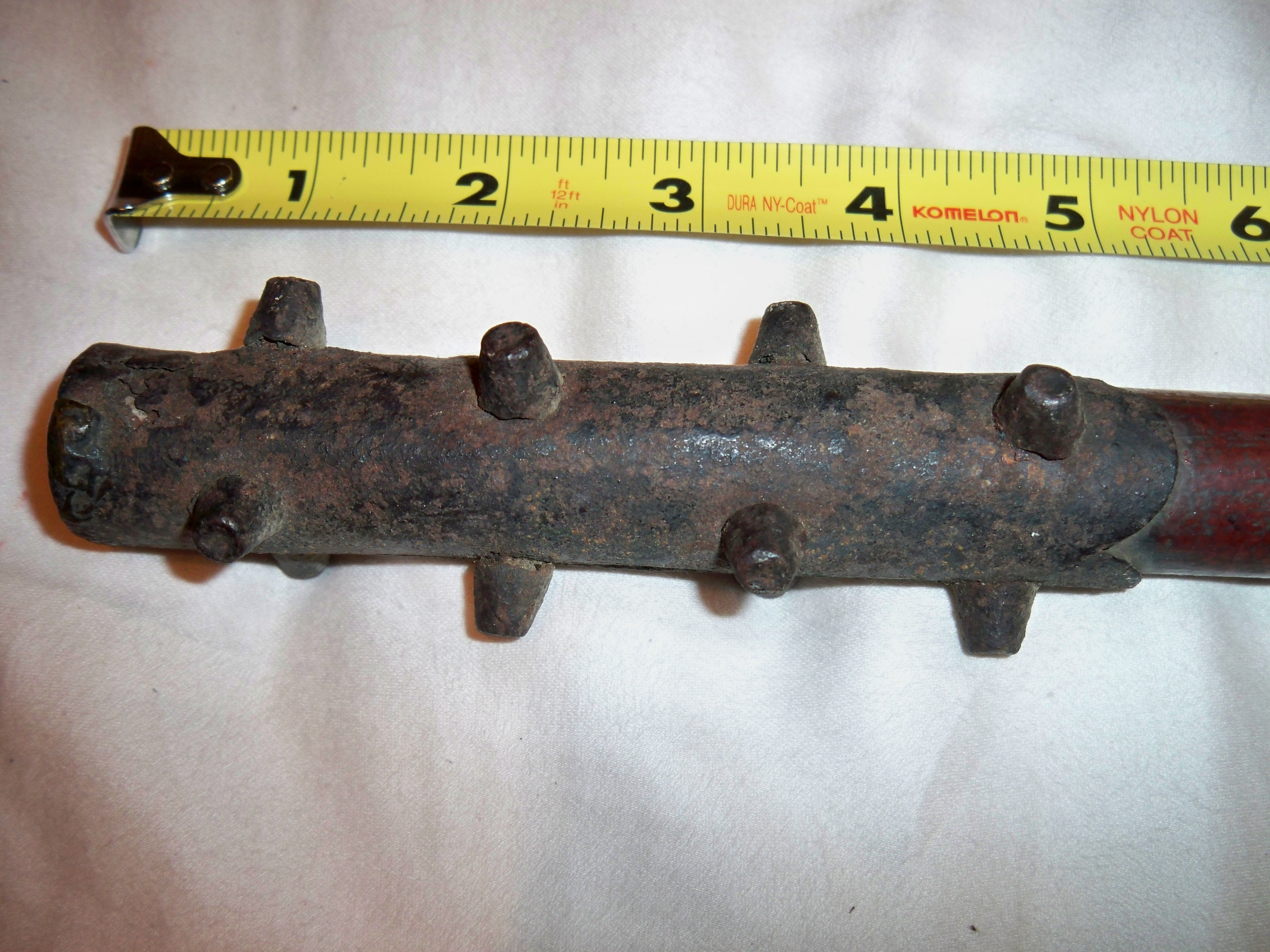
A close-up of the iron studs on an antique Japanese ararebō, a small version of the kanabō

== See also ==
- Bō
- Hanbō
- Jō
- Tanbō
- List of martial arts weapons
- Mace (bludgeon)
- Macuahuitl
- Morning star (weapon)
- War hammer
