= Gosoku-ryu =

Style of karate

Gosoku-ryū 剛速流
- Also known as: Gosoku Ryu, Go Soku ryu
- Country of origin: Japan
- Founder: Takayuki Kubota
- Current head: Rod Kuratomi
- Arts taught: Karate • kobudo
- Ancestor schools: Shōtōkan • Gōjū-ryū
- Practitioners: James Caan, Rod Kuratomi, Val Mijailovic, Takemasa Okuyama, Grant Campbell, Natasha Inuhaere, Mike Ireland, Orlando Castro
- Official website: ikakarate.com

Gosoku-ryū (剛速流) is a style of karate which was founded by Takayuki Kubota. Gosoku stands for hard and fast, which suggests a combination of techniques both from the fast and dynamic Shōtōkan style as well as from the strength-focused Gōjū-ryū style.

== Background ==
The International Karate Association (IKA) was formed in Tokyo, Japan in 1953 for the purpose of teaching and promoting the Gosoku style of karate. Gosoku-ryū, "the style of force with speed", incorporates the methods of Goju-ryū and Shotokan karate with aikido, jujitsu, and judo. It is applied so as to encompass any attacker from all angles.

In 1964, Kubota came to the United States. He was able to gather several talented young men to create the nucleus of the US branch. Under Kubota's tutelage, the IKA has achieved wide recognition in the martial arts world. Members of the organization have won championship titles, including California state, US national, and world championships. The IKA reaches worldwide with headquarters located in Glendale, California.

== Belt system ==
Advancement through the ranks, as marked by belt color, is a process signifying progressively greater control and coordination of mind and body. The length of time involved is largely dependent upon the dedication of the individual student.

The progressive ranks of karate are reflected in the different colored belts. There are two major classifications: the ranks of black belt are called dans, while all those below the rank of black belt are Kyūs.

In Gosoku-ryū, there are ten kyu ratings, as follows:

Lowest
10th Kyu	White
9th Kyu	Yellow Belt
8th Kyu	Orange Belt
7th Kyu	Blue Belt
6th Kyu	Purple Belt
5th Kyu	Green Belt
4th Kyu	Green Belt
3rd Kyu	Brown Belt
2nd Kyu	Brown Belt
1st Kyu	Brown Belt
Highest

After achieving shodan, or first degree black belt ranking, a karateka may progress further though the dan ranks up to ju-dan, or tenth degree black belt.

Lowest
1st Dan	Black Belt 1st Dan
2nd Dan	Black Belt 2nd Dan
3rd Dan	Black Belt 3rd Dan
4th Dan	Black Belt 4th Dan
5th Dan	Black Belt 5th Dan
6th Dan	Black Belt 6th Dan
7th Dan	Black Belt 7th Dan
8th Dan	Black Belt 8th Dan
9th Dan	Black Belt 9th Dan
10th Dan	Black Belt 10th Dan
10th Dan	Ju-dan
Highest

The ju-dan sometimes wears a red belt to distinguish him or herself. Instructors that are 4th dan are sometimes awarded the title of "Shihan-Dai" (deputy master). Instructors that are 5th dan or higher are sometimes awarded the title of "Shihan" (master instructor). Title is not always awarded by rank alone. One must be an active instructor and be awarded the rank by Kubota.

== Major differences from other styles ==
Gosoku-ryū is similar to Shotokan karate. It differs from Shotokan in that it incorporates the linear power movements of Shotokan with the speed and soft circular motions of Gōjū-ryū. The meaning of Gosoku-Ryu is "Hard and fast". Emphasis is put on practical application and sparring. Stances are generally shorter when in defensive positions and transition to longer stances when power moves are delivered. During kicks, including kihon, hands are kept in guard (and not spread aside). Gosoku-ryū teaches quick leg sweeps and take-downs; in kumite, attacks often end on the floor. Fast footwork which adds speed and power by utilizing the rotation of the hip makes Gosoku-ryū different from other styles. Gosoku-ryū also incorporates aikido, judo, and jujitsu techniques, which are used in ground fighting and for control and restraint techniques that are taught to law enforcement.

== Kobudo weapons ==
Many weapons are practiced in the dojo: Kubotan, Tonfa, Kama, Jō, Bokuto, Bokken, Shinai, Tsue (walking cane), and the Katana (Japanese sword). Kubota trained with Taira Shinken learning ancient Kobudo katas while developing his own for his school. The Kobudo kata created by him include:

- Tonfa: Washi no kata, Juji no uke.
- Jō: Keibo jitsu, Ken shin ryū.
- Tsue (walking cane): Tsue ichi no kata, ni no kata, san no kata, yon no kata, go no kata, roku no kata, Mawashi no kata.
- Katana (created by Kubota): Sankaku giri, Atemi no kata, Kubo giri, Gyaku giri, Iaido ichi no kata, ni no kata, san no kata, Toshin.
- Bokken: Ken no Michi, Ken no Mai

== Prominent students ==
- Kyoshi Hank Hamilton 7th dan
- Ronald Belliveau 6th Dan
- Hanshi Temoanarupe Inuhaere 9th Dan
- Kyoshi Natasha Inuhaere 8th Dan
- Hanshi Mike Ireland 9th Dan
- Kancho Takemasa Okuyama 10th Dan
- Orlando Castro 7th dan
