= Uchida =

Uchida (written: 内田 lit. "within ricefield") is a Japanese surname. Notable people with the surname include:

- Aguri Uchida (born 1949), a Japanese watercolour painter
- Akiko Uchida (born 1985), a Japanese volleyball player
- Asahi Uchida (born 1982), a Japanese actor
- Atsuto Uchida, a Japanese football player
- Aya Uchida (born 1986), a Japanese voice actress
- Hiroki Uchida (内田 大貴; born 1990), Japanese footballer
- Hyakken Uchida, (1889–1971), a Japanese author and academic
- Irene Uchida (1917–2013), Canadian scientist and researcher
- Jun Uchida, a Japanese football player
- Uchida Kakichi (1866–1933), a Japanese politician
- Kaichi Uchida, a Japanese tennis player
- Katherine Uchida (born 1999), a Canadian rhythmic gymnast
- Kenji Uchida, a Japanese anime producer
- Kenji Uchida (film director), a Japanese film director
- Kenta Uchida, a Japanese football player
- Kohei Uchida (内田 航平; born 1993), Japanese footballer
- Uchida Kosai (1865–1936), a Japanese statesman
- Uchida Kuichi (1844–1875), a Japanese photographer
- Makoto Uchida, a Japanese video game programmer
- Maaya Uchida (内田 真礼, born 1989), a Japanese voice actress
- Minoru Uchida (born 1927), a Japanese actor
- Mitsuko Uchida (born 1948), a Japanese-born classical pianist
- Naoya Uchida (born 1953), a Japanese actor and voice actor
- Robert Uchida (born 1979), a Canadian violinist
- Uchida Ryogoro (1837–1921), a Japanese jojutsu practitioner
- Ryōhei Uchida (1873–1937), a Japanese nationalist and political theorist
  - Uchida Ryu Tanjojutsu, the martial arts school Uchida Ryogoro devised
- Sadatsuchi Uchida (1865–1942), a Japanese consul general to the United States
- Sho Uchida (born 1987), a Japanese freestyle swimmer
- Shoji Uchida (born 1949), a Japanese modern pentathlete, competitor at the 1976 and 1984 Summer Olympics
- Shungicu Uchida (born 1959), a Japanese manga artist and novelist
- Takatoshi Uchida (内田 宝寿; born 1982), Japanese footballer
- Tatsuya Uchida (内田 達也; born 1992), Japanese footballer
- Toichi Uchida, Japanese entomologist (1898–1974)
- Tohru Uchida, Japanese marine zoologist (1897 - 1981)
- Tomoya Uchida (born 1983), a Japanese football player
- Tomu Uchida (1898–1970), a Japanese filmmaker
- Yosh Uchida (1920–2024), American businessman and judoka
- Yoshikazu Uchida (1885–1972), a Japanese architect and structural engineer
- Yoshiko Uchida (1921–1992), a Japanese American writer
- Yuki Uchida (内田 有紀; born 1975), Japanese actress, idol, singer and model
- Yuma Uchida (born 1992), a Japanese voice actor
- Yuya Uchida (singer) (1939–2019), a Japanese actor and singer
- Yūya Uchida (voice actor) (born 1965), a Japanese voice actor
- Yuzaburo Uchida (1894–1966), a Japanese psychologist

== See also ==
- Uchida Station, railway station in Aka, Fukuoka
- Uchida (brand), an electronics brand name of Maspion
