= Takemasa Okuyama =

Canadian karateka

Takemasa Okuyama (born 1944) is the head of the International Karate Association of Canada and has the title of Kancho.

Born in Hachijōjima, Japan, Okuyama began to train in Japan at the age of 7. In line with the family tradition, he practised sumo and judo. At the age of 13 he started to learn karate from Kinjo from Okinawa. In 1960, he started to study at the Takushoku University in Japan. He studied political science and foreign trade, regularly training karate masters such as Tabata, Hamanaka, Ozawa and Katsunori Tsuyama. In 1966, he arrived in the US to continue his studies and trained for three years under the instruction of Takayuki Kubota. In 1970, he moved to Canada, where he is influential person in the Gosoku-ryu and Shotokan karate environment. In the same year he placed third in kumite at 5th Annual All-Stars Tournament. He established IKA Canada Kubota Cup in 1971 In 1992, Takayuki Kubota awarded him with the Kancho title and 8 dan degree in karate. In 1997, he published a book called Ultimate Karate (ISBN 0-9683373-0-9) which demonstrates karate techniques for the serious student, showing intricate applications of stances and hand techniques beyond the Heian katas and Tekki Shodan.

Okuyama received the Key to the City of Cali, Colombia from Mayor Ricardo Cobo, and special awards from the City of Be'er Sheva, Israel from Mayor Kakuv for peace work between Israel and Palestine.

Okuyama has also trained law enforcement personnel around the world including: Colombian Military & Special Forces Police, Canadian Military Police, Moscow Police, Israeli Military, Ecuador Police.

Apart from his karate activity, Okuyama is president of Hachi-O-Zan Ltd. and an artist who occupies himself with traditional painting and playing the Japanese flute.
