= Uchida Ryu Tanjojutsu =

Japanese martial arts school of tanjojutsu

Uchida-ryū (内田流)
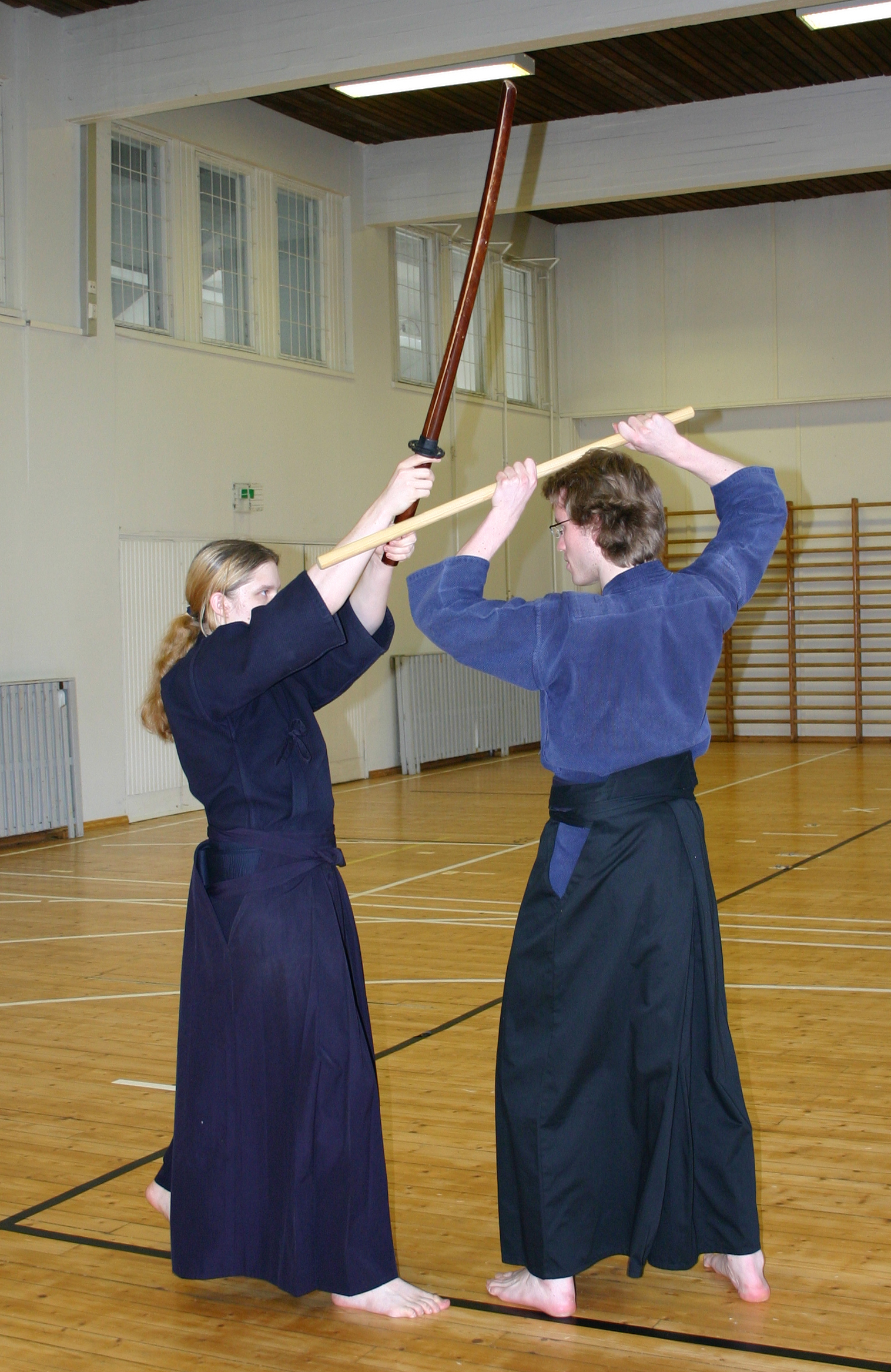
- Date founded: Late 19th century
- Country of origin: Japan
- Founder: Uchida Ryogoro (1837-1921)
- Current head: No single headmaster
- Arts taught: Tanjōjutsu
- Ancestor schools: Shintō Musō-ryū

Uchida-ryū Tanjōjutsu (内田流短杖術), also known as Sutekki-Jutsu, is a Japanese martial arts school of tanjojutsu, originally devised by Shinto Muso-ryu practicitioner Uchida Ryogoro (1837-1921) as a way to utilize the western-style walking stick into a weapon of self-defence. The tanjo is not to be confused with the pre-meji era short stick hanbō.

== History ==
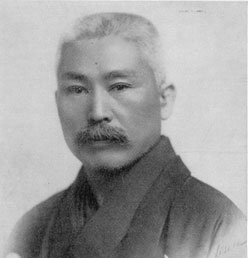
Uchida Ryohei - Son of the original developer of the tanjojutsu kata that would eventually be systematized into the Uchida-ryu tanjojutsu system

After the Meiji Restoration in 1869, which would herald the Meiji Era, Japan took a giant leap from the old feudal system into a more modern western style society. The old samurai-caste was disestablished and everything western were brought into Japan as a way to modernize its society, military and economy. This included the construction of railroads, reforming the military based on the Prussian system and building new facilities for modern communication and modernising and expanding the domestic industry. It would also bring along western clothing with European clothes which would become a popular new choice of wardrobe for the Japanese of this new age.

Among the things that were imported the western style walking stick was one of them, and this Western high status symbol quickly became a popular item in Japan, especially for former status-conscious samurai who were not allowed to wear swords anymore as a sign of their previously lost high status and other high-ranking individuals. In 1885, Uchida Ryogoro, who was a student of Shinto Muso-ryu (jodo), devised a new set of self-defence techniques for the tanjo drawn primarily from existing jodo techniques. He did this as a way of popularizing jodo. From the techniques originally created by Uchida Ryogoro a set of 12 kata were put together, with the assistance of his son Uchida Ryohei, and organized into a system which was named Uchida-ryū Tanjōjutsu.

== Tanjō methods ==
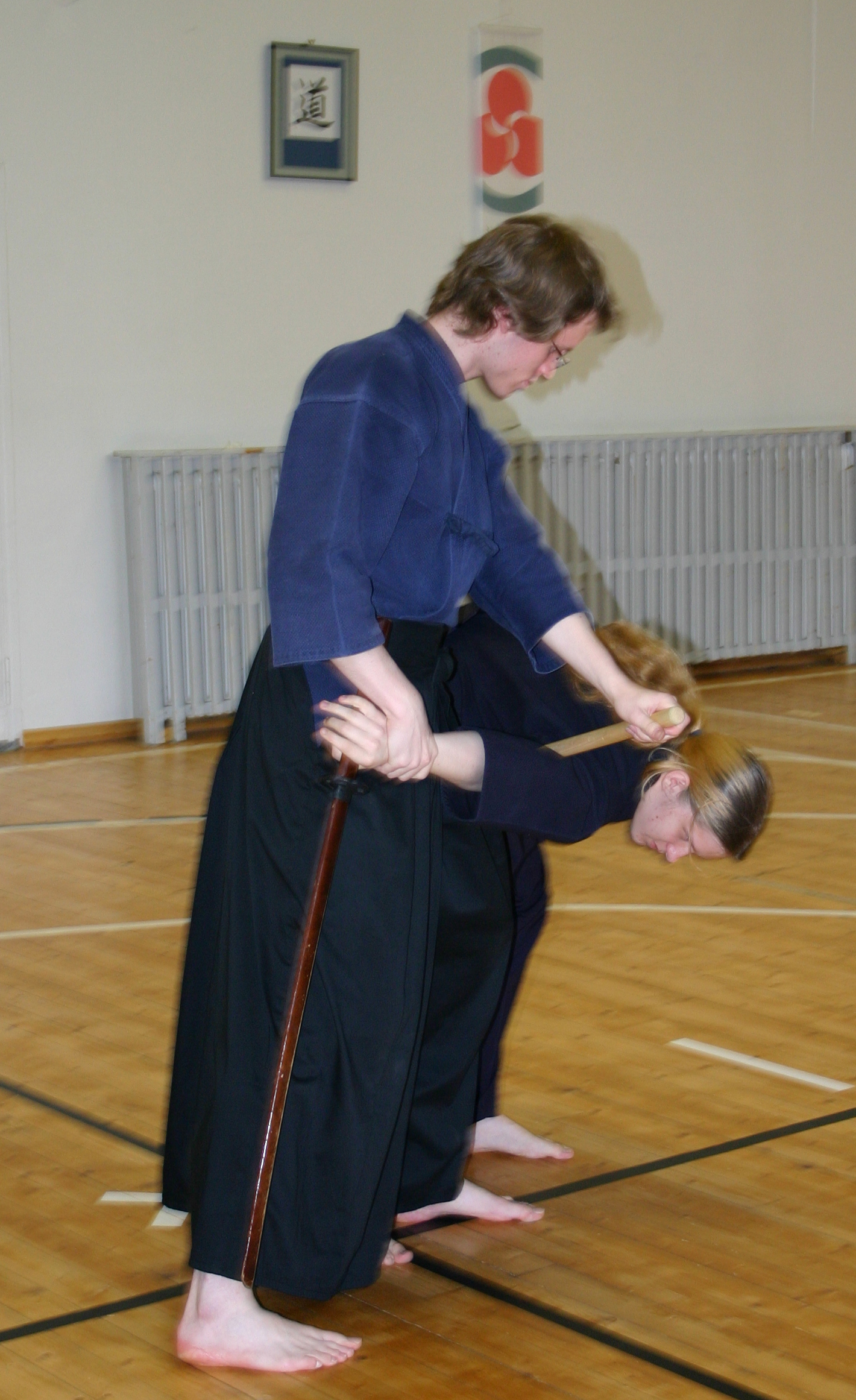
Demonstration of Ushiro zue, a Uchida-ryū tanjōjutsu kata

== List of the modern Uchida-ryū Tanjō forms ==
The modern Uchida-ryū Tanjōjutsu comprises 12 forms.

- 1. Kote Uchi Hidari (小手打 左)
- 2. Kote Uchi Migi (小手打 右)
- 3. Sutemi (捨身)
- 4. Kuri tsuke (繰付)
- 5. Ushiro dzue (後杖)
- 6. Suigetsu Hidari (水月 左)
- 7. Suigetsu Migi (水月 右)
- 8. Shamen Hidari (斜面 左)
- 9. Shamen Migi (斜面 右)
- 10. Kobushi kudaki (拳砕)
- 11. Irimi (入身)
- 12. Sune kudaki (脛砕)

This system is today fully integrated into the Shinto Muso-ryu (jodo) organisation, although some of the techniques and the general handling of the tanjo has been modified over the years.
