= American Jujitsu Association =

Amateur ju-jitsu association

The American Ju-Jitsu Association (AJA) is a national, non-profit amateur athletic association founded in 1972 to support the martial art of traditional Japanese ju-jitsu. It is registered with both the state of California and the U.S. government as a 501(c)(3) organization, and is the only martial arts body in the U.S. classified as an amateur athletic association. The AJA promotes a variety of safe competitive formats, recognizes outstanding instructors with national awards, and provides liability/accident insurance and certificates of rank to members who meet the criteria of their particular ryū (style).

== Purpose ==
The American Ju-Jitsu Association brings together different ryū of the art in an atmosphere of cooperation and respect. Among the styles currently represented in the AJA are American Combat Jujitsu, Budoshin Ju-Jitsu, Daitō-ryū Aiki-jūjutsu, Danzan-ryū, Hakkō-ryū Jujutsu, Small Circle JuJitsu, and Taiho-jutsu.

== History ==
George Kirby (1944−) and William Fromm (1935–2003) established the American Ju-Jitsu Association in 1972 at the request of their sensei, Sanzo “Jack” Seki (1914–98), a student of Kanō Jigorō, the founder of judo. Since its inception, the AJA has grown from two dojo (schools) to over thirty, in addition to international affiliates, and currently serves over 500 registered or affiliated members. Led for many years by co-founder George Kirby—prolific author of instructional publications and Black Belt magazine's “Instructor of the Year” in 2007—the AJA works closely with other major ju-jitsu organizations in the United States and abroad in areas of mutual concern. Over the decades, martial artists with international reputations have served on the AJA's board of directors, including Tony Maynard, founder of American Combat Jujitsu.

== Affiliates ==
The American Ju-Jitsu Association has partnered with the United States Ju-Jitsu Federation, the European Ju-Jitsu Union (EJJU), and the Intercontinental Ju-Jitsu Organization (IJJO). The AJA is also an honorary affiliate of Seibukan Renmei USA, which promotes the spirit of friendship, cooperation, continual education, and development of Japanese martial arts and ways (bujutsu and budo).
