= Henmi Sōsuke =

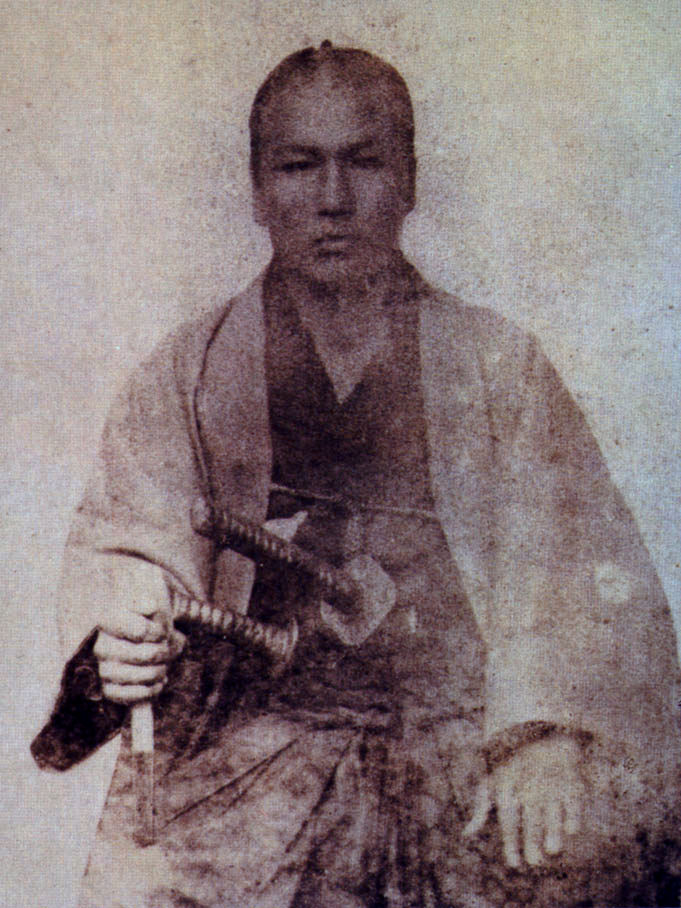
- Henmi Sōsuke (1843–1894)
- Born: 1843; Sakura Domain, Shimōsa Province
- Died: 1894 (aged 50–51)
- Occupations: Samurai, Traditional Japanese martial arts instructor, Police officer
- Employer(s): Sakura Domain, Tokyo Metropolitan Police Department

Henmi Sōsuke (逸見 宗助; 1843 – 1894) was a Japanese swordsman who also served as a martial arts instructor of Tatsumi-ryū and Tokyo Metropolitan Police Department.

== Biography ==
Henmi was known to be born in 1843 as a son of Henmi Nobutaka (逸見信敬), a clansman of the Sakura Domain and the 17th head family of Tatsumi-ryū.

Tatsumi-ryū is a Traditional Japanese martial arts. During Edo period when the use of protective gears became popular, the Sakura Domain allowed its clansmen to contest with different schools such as Hokushin Ittō-ryū (北辰一刀流) and Kyōshin Meichi-ryū (鏡新明智流) from 1850. Henmi was given lessons from Ueda Umanosuke (上田馬之助) of Kyōshin Meichi-ryū (鏡新明智流).

In 1860, Henmi was given Iai Mokuroku (居合目録) which served as a license of the Tatsumi-ryū from his father. In the next year, Henmi obtained a permission from Sakura Domain to study in Edo. He studied in Shigakukan Dojo for 1 year, and was awarded a title of Shihan as soon as he returned to his hometown.

After the Meiji Restoration, Henmi worked as a tillager in Yachimata. In 1879, he was hired by the Tokyo Metropolitan Police Department as a martial arts instructor. He established Keishiryū (警視流) there, and became the leading figure of martial arts at Tokyo Metropolitan Police Department. He is briefly described in F.J. Norman’s Fighting Man of Japan (1905), as possibly the best swordsman he had met in Japan.

== See also ==
- Tatsumi-ryū
- Kendo
