= Takayuki Kubota =

Japanese martial artist (1934–2024)

- Born: September 20, 1934; Kumamoto, Japan
- Died: August 14, 2024 (aged 89); Glendale, California, U.S.
- Citizenship: Japan; United States (after 1974)
- Occupations: Martial arts instructor; stunt performer; actor
- Martial arts career
- Style: Gosoku-ryu Karate; Kubojitsu; Kubotactical; Toshin-ryu Iaido
- Teachers: Terada, Tokunaga, Cai
- Rank: 10th dan karate, 10th dan kubojitsu, 5th dan aikido, 5th dan judo, 2nd dan kendo
- Years active: 1947–2024

Other information
- Notable students: James Caan; Chuck Norris
- Website: http://ikakarate.com/

Japanese name
- Kanji: 窪田 孝行
- Hiragana: くぼた たかゆき
- Katakana: クボタ タカユキ
Transcriptions
- Romanization: Kubota Takayuki

Takayuki Kubota (窪田 孝行, Kubota Takayuki; September 20, 1934 – August 14, 2024), also known as Tak Kubota, was a Japanese and American karateka, known for founding the Gosoku-ryu style of karate. He held the title of sōke (grandmaster) for his development of the Gosoku-ryū, and was the founder and president of the International Karate Association. He was also the inventor and holder of the trademark of the Kubotan self-defense key chain.

Kubota was a self-defense instructor for the Tokyo Police department in the 1950s, where he was noted for his expertise in practical karate. He moved to the United States in the 1960's, where he developed the Gosoku-ryū style. He would develop and teach the application of techniques self-defense techniques to military, law enforcement, and civilian personnel. He also worked as a stuntman and actor in the film industry.

At the time of his death, Kubota had held black belt degrees in karate (10th dan), judo (5th dan), aikido (5th dan), kendo (2nd dan), and iaido.

== Early life ==
Kubota was born on September 20, 1934, in Kumamoto, Japan, into the family of Denjiro (father) and Semo (mother) Kubota. He had four brothers, of which one became a kendo master, one a jujitsu master, and one the Japanese Olympic volleyball coach. In 1939, at the age of four, Kubota began studying martial arts under the direction of his father, who was a master of jujitsu and jukendo. The training included bamboo yadi, judo, keibo-jutsu (baton), and makiwara practice.

During World War II, Kubota learned karate under the guidance of two Okinawans—Terada and Tokunaga—stationed in his village. They were teaching local people with basics in the martial art of te; there was no name "karate" at that time in Okinawa.

At the age of 13, Kubota went to Tokyo to seek his fortune—against his father's will. Upon arrival, he discovered that there was no work and no place to stay. While in a queue for food, however, Kubota helped the police to capture some criminals using his skill in taiho jutsu (arresting technique). One of the officers, Detective Karino, gave Kubota a place to stay and helped him finish his education. Karino brought him to the dojo (training hall) of Chinese master Cai and, in return, he taught Karino the art of taiho jutsu. Until he earned enough money for classes, Kubota watched techniques at one of the top karate schools from outside at night. When he earned enough money, he continued his formal training inside a dojo.

== Instructing career ==
In 1947, at age of 14, Kubota was noticed by Tokyo Police and was soon teaching hand-to-hand and baton combat to officers of Kamata Police Department; he did this for 10 years. He tested his martial arts skills by working as an agent in dangerous districts of Tokyo and being used as a one-man riot control by police. It was in this era that Gosoku-ryu techniques were refined. He complemented his martial arts training with studies in meditation, history, and other non-combative aspects of the arts.

Kubota opened his first karate dojo at the age of 17. From 1950–1959, he was an instructor for the US Army, Air Force, and Marines in kendo, karate, judo, and giyokute-jitsu. Between 1960 and 1963, he taught pro-wrestling techniques at Haneda dojo.

As he became more well known, the US military and government personnel at the American military bases stationed there invited him to teach self-defense and show demonstrations. From 1958 to 1960, he taught the US Military Police and other personnel at Camp Zama, Kanagawa, Japan. In addition, from 1959 to 1964, he taught self-defense to the US Army personnel at Kishine Barracks in Yokohama. At the same, during 1961 to 1963, he was teaching the American personnel at Grand Heights Air Force Base in Tokyo and US Air Force Police at Fuchu Air Force Base. He also worked as a bodyguard to the US Ambassador to Japan. Through 1964, Kubota taught self-defense to other government personnel, including the CIA agents at the US military bases throughout Japan.

On August 2, 1964, Kubota was invited by Ed Parker to give a demonstration at Parker's First Annual International Karate Tournament in Long Beach, California. In late 1964, he permanently relocated to America. Kubota taught self-defense at the Los Angeles Police Department Academy for several years. Kubota developed his own style of karate, naming it Gosoku-ryu ("hard-fast style"), and he consequently held the title Sōke, meaning "head of family/style."

Kubota became an American citizen in 1974.

In 1990, Kubota was inducted into the Black Belt magazine's Hall of Fame as 'Weapons Instructor of the Year.'

== Inventions ==
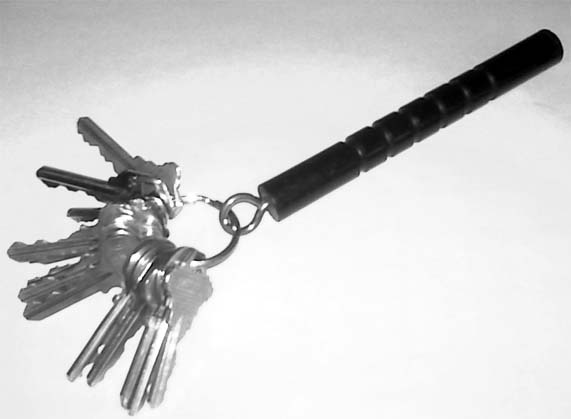
The Kubotan key chain

The five and a half inch plastic Kubotan key chain is Kubota's most important invention. It was designed as a tool for female Los Angeles Police Department officers, and registered as trademark in 1978. Kubota also developed the Kubotai, another self-defense weapon, which was patented in 1991. The Kubotai is used to employ wrist locks and immobilize the opponent.

== Death ==
Kubota died in Glendale, California. on August 14, 2024, at the age of 89. He was survived by his wife of 59 years, Thea, and daughters, Amy and Sara. His son, Tyler, died of cancer on August 6, 2024.

== Books ==
Kubota wrote several books on the martial arts:

1. Kubota, Takayuki; McCaul, Paul (1972). Baton techniques and training (illustrated ed.). Thomas. ISBN 0-398-02338-7.
2. Kubota, Takayuki; Miller, Mark (1977). The art of karate (1 ed.). Haddington House. ISBN 0-672-52331-0.
3. Kubota, Takayuki (1980). Fighting Karate Gosoku Ryu Hard Fast Style. Unique Publications (Subs. of CFW Enterprises, Inc). ISBN 0-86568-010-8.
4. Kubota, Takayuki (1980). Gosoku ryu karate: kumite 1. Unique.
5. Peters, John; Kubota, Takayuki; Defensive Tactics Institute, Inc (1981). Realistic defensive tactics (illustrated ed.). Reliapon Police Products. ISBN 0-935878-02-5.
6. Kubota, Takayuki (1982). Action Kubotan Keychain an Aid in Self Defense. Beckett Pubns. ISBN 0-86568-101-5.
7. Kubota, Takayuki; Peters, John (1983). Official Kubotan techniques. Kubotan Institute.
8. Kubota, Takayuki (1983). T-Hold Kubotan. Unique Publications. ISBN 0-86568-111-2.
9. Kubota, Takayuki (1983). Weapons Kumite: Fighting With Traditional Weapons. Unique Publications. ISBN 0-86568-042-6.
10. Kubota, Takayuki (1985). Kubotan keychain: instrument of attitude adjustment (reprinted ed.). Dragon Books. ISBN 0-946062-09-9.
11. Kubota, Takayuki (1985). Ninja Shuriken Manual (reprinted ed.). I & I Sports Supply Co. ISBN 0-934489-00-9.
12. Kubota, Takayuki (1987). Close encounters: the arresting art of taiho-jutsu (illustrated ed.). Dragon Books. ISBN 0-946062-20-X.
13. Kubota, Takayuki (2003). Fighting Karate (illustrated ed.). Unique Publications. ISBN 0-86568-205-4.

== Media appearances ==
Kubota was featured in more than 280 movies and TV shows, and over 180 commercials.

Year	Title	Role	Notes
1972	The Mechanic	Yamoto aka Killer of Killers	
1975	The Killer Elite	Negato Toku	
1977	Operation Petticoat	Japanese Officer	
1983	Focus on Fishko	James Fikuta	
1993	Rising Sun	Yakuza Henchman	
1995	The Hunted	Oshima	
2001	Pearl Harbor	Japanese Aide #3	
2001	Power Rangers Time Force: Photo Finish	Elder Monk	
2006	The Fast and the Furious: Tokyo Drift	Yakuza Man	
2020	Glitch Techs	Karate Master	

== Celebrity students ==
Over the years Kubota taught martial arts to many actors Chuck Barris, Dick Martin, Ron Ely, Bo Hopkins, Randolph Mantooth, Tim McIntire, the Bay City Rollers, Sam Peckinpah, Gary Owens, Stirling Silliphant, David Jensen, Sy Weintraub, Peter Frampton, Robert Conrad, George Kennedy, Tammy Lauren, Nancy McKeon, Hilary Swank.

James Caan may have been his most loyal celebrity student, having trained with him from 1975 until at least 2004.
