= Uchida Ryogoro =

Uchida Ryōgorō Shigeyoshi (written as Ryōgorō Uchida in the west), (1837 - October 22, 1921), was a Japanese jojutsu practitioner, ranked menkyo in the Japanese martial art of Shintō Musō-ryū. He is the creator of the gendai budo Uchida Ryu Tanjojutsu, originally known as Sutteki jutsu or "stick method".

Uchida Ryōgorō Shigeyoshi was born as Hiraoka Ryōgorō in 1837 to father Hiraoka Nisaburo. He was the eldest of six children. After Ryōgorōs 14th birthday he was adopted into the Uchida family and took on the Uchida family name. He was adopted due to a lack of an heir to the Uchida family name.

Ryōgorōs biological father held a license to teach (Menkyo) in the Haruyoshi-branch of the "New Just" Muso-ryu tradition. From an early age Ryōgorō showed an aptitude for martial arts and excelled in his studies. He trained in all of the arts a bushi (warrior) was expected to learn which included horsemanship, bowmanship, gunnery, swordsmanship, spear and a multitude of other weapons and skills. Among the arts he learned was Ono-ha Itto-ryu swordsmanship from Ikuoka Heitaro, the art of spear from a retainer of the Takeda family, Kyushin-ryu jujutsu from exponent named Ishikawa and Shinto Muso-ryu Jo from Hirano Kichizo Yoshinobu of the Haruyoshi-branch. Ryōgorō is said to have received the scroll of complete transmission from each of the mentioned ryu.

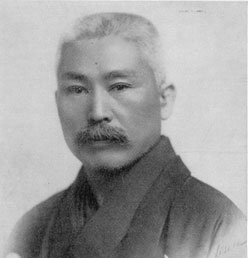
Uchida Ryohei - Son of the original developer of the tanjojutsu kata that would eventually be systematized into the Uchida-ryu tanjojutsu system

Sometime after the Seinan war of 1877, Ryōgorō moved to Tokyo and started teaching Shintō Musō-ryū, though in a smaller scale than his successor Shimizu Takaji. Two of his known students were Ryōhei Uchida (his son) and Nakayama Hakudo (the founder of Muso Shinden-ryu iaido and a master of kendo). Ryōgorō created a set of tanjo kata based on the teachings of Shintō Musō-ryū and influenced by the walking sticks gentleman of the era carried, which he called "Sutekki" (the Japanese way to pronounce "stick"). After his death, the set of kata were named Uchida Ryu in his honor and are now practiced as one of the heiden bujutsu of Shintō Musō-ryū.
