= Bō =

East Asian staff weapon

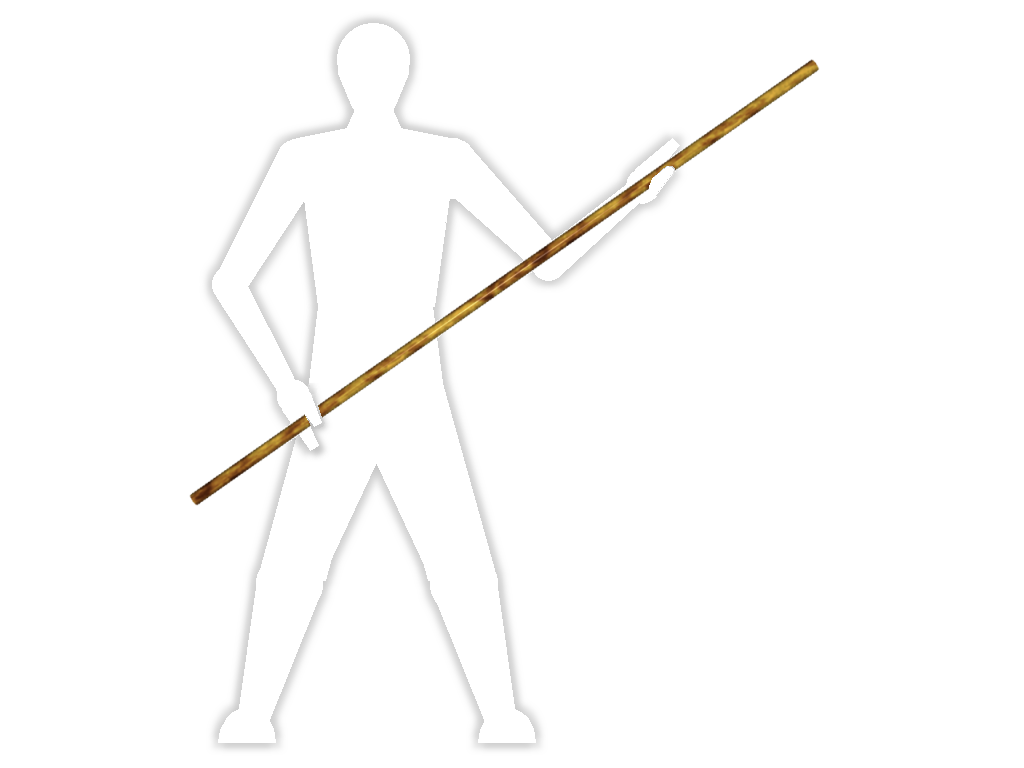
A traditional rokushakubō is 1.82m (6 shaku) and wielded with both hands, due to its weight and size.

A bō (棒) (pong (Korean); pang (Cantonese); bang (Mandarin); kun (Okinawan)) is a staff weapon used in Okinawa. Rokushakubō are typically around 1.82 m (72 in) long and are used in Okinawan martial arts and Japanese arts such as bōjutsu. Other staff-related weapons are the jō, which does not have a standard length, and the hanbō (half bō), which is 90 cm (35 in) long.

== Types ==
The bō is traditionally made of polished native hardwood, such as oak or ash, but modern martial arts tournaments have led to innovations in the use of soft- and other hardwoods. Bamboo and pine wood have been used; more common still is rattan wood for its strength and flexibility. Some bō are very light, with metallic sides, stripes and a grip which are used for XMA and competitions/demonstrations. The modern bō is usually round or circular (maru-bo). Older bō were round (maru-bo), square (kaku-bo), hexagonal (rokkaku-bo) or octagonal (hakkaku-bo). The average size of a bō is 6 shaku (around 6 ft (1.8 m)) but they can be as long as 9 ft (2.7 m) (kyu-shaku-bō).

A 6 ft (1.8 m) bō is usually called a rokushakubō (六尺棒). This name derives from the Japanese words roku (六), meaning "six"; shaku (尺); and bō, meaning "staff". The shaku is a Japanese measurement equivalent to 30.3 centimeters (0.994 ft). Thus, rokushakubō refers to a staff about 6-shaku (1.82 m; 5.96 feet) long. The bō is typically approximately 3 cm (1.25 inch) thick, sometimes gradually tapering from the middle (chukon-bu) to 2 cm (0.75 inch) at the ends (kontei). Traditional bō are not tapered. This thickness allows the user to make a tight fist around it in order to block and counter an attack.

In some cases for training purposes or for a different style, and in more recent years, rattan is used. Some were inlaid or banded with strips of iron or other metals for extra strength. Bō range from heavy to light, from rigid to highly flexible, and from simple pieces of wood picked up from the side of the road to ornately decorated works of art.

== Martial arts ==
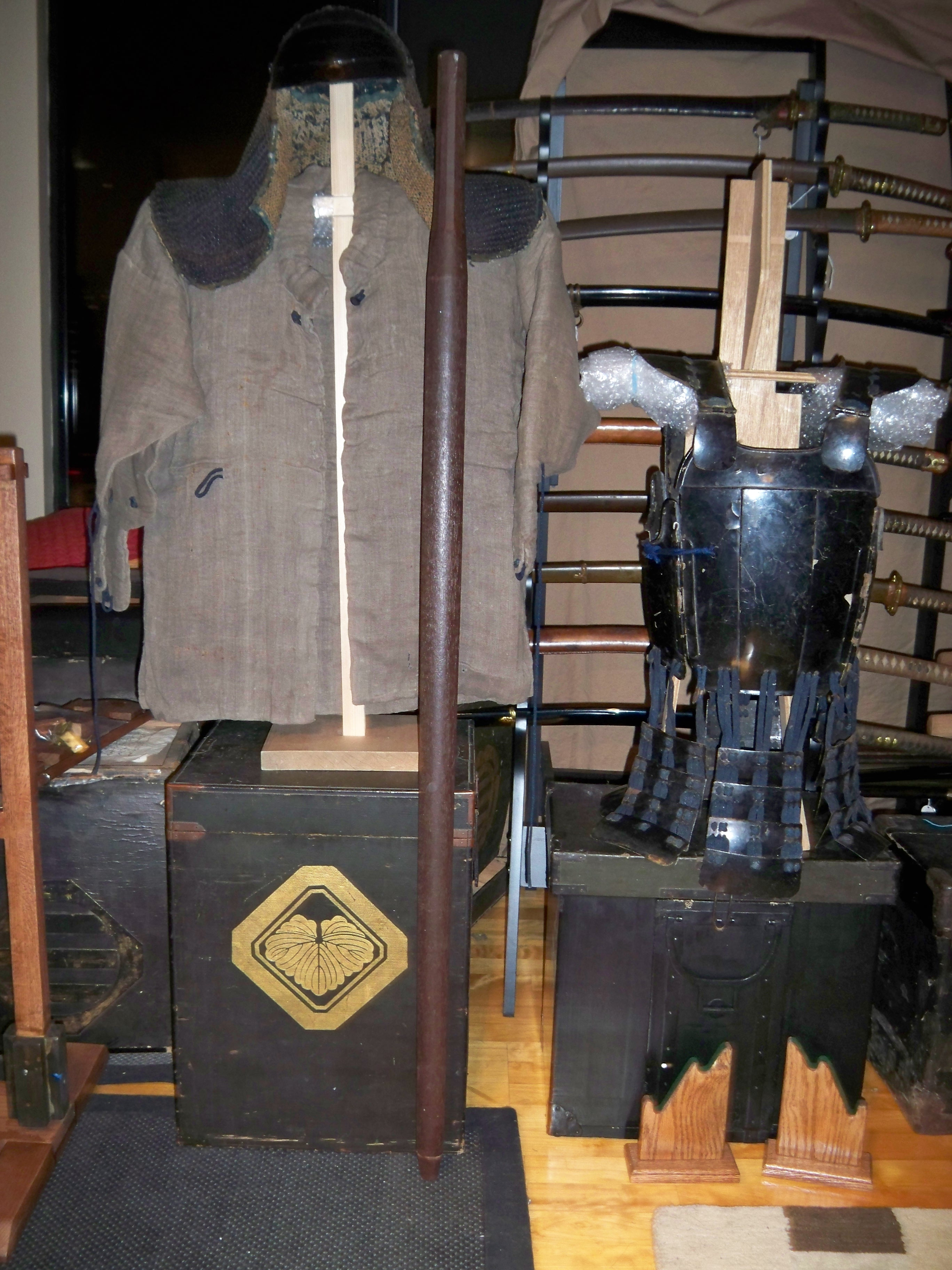
Japanese wooden staff "bō" weapon made in the shape of a walking cane, 1.4 m (4 ft 7 in) tall and 15 cm (5.9 in) circumference

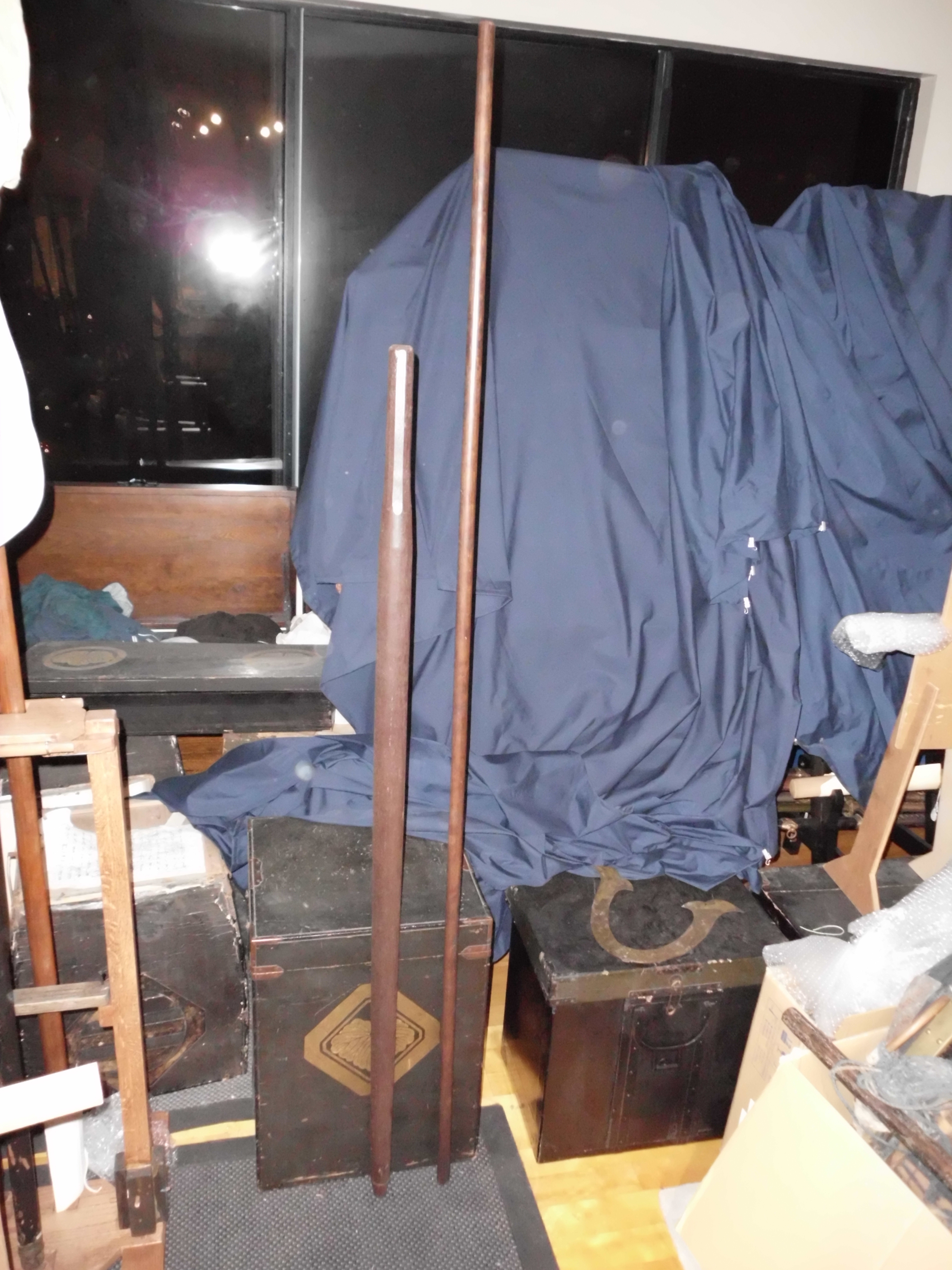
Two Japanese bō; one is 140 cm (55 in) tall and 15 cm (5.9 in) in circumference in the form of a walking stick, the other is 180 cm (6 ft) tall and 1 in (25 mm) in diameter in the form of a staff.

The Japanese martial art of wielding the bō is bōjutsu. The basis of bō technique is te, or hand, techniques derived from quanfa and other martial arts that reached Okinawa via trade and Chinese monks. Thrusting, swinging, and striking techniques often resemble empty-hand movements, following the philosophy that the bō is merely an "extension of one’s limbs". Consequently, bōjutsu is often incorporated into other styles of empty hand fighting, such as karate. The "bō" is also used as a spear and long sword in some of its motions, such as upward swing and slashing motion across the body as well as extensions by gripping one end and thus increasing its length as thus making it similar to a spear.

The bō is typically gripped in thirds, with one palm facing the opposite direction of the other palm, enabling the staff to rotate and to secure the weapon when blocking. The power is generated by the back hand pulling the staff, while the front hand is used for guidance. Bō technique includes a wide variety of blocks, strikes, sweeps, and entrapments.

== History ==
The earliest form of the bō, a staff, has been used throughout Asia since the beginning of recorded history. Used for self-defense by monks or commoners, the staff was an integral part of the Tenshin Shōden Katori Shintō-ryū, one of the martial arts oldest surviving styles. The staff evolved into the bō with the foundation of kobudō, a martial art using weapons, which emerged in Okinawa in the early 17th century.

Prior to the 15th century, Okinawa, a small island located south of Japan, was divided into three kingdoms: Chuzan, Hokuzan, and Nanzan. After much political turmoil, Okinawa was united under the First Sho Dynasty in 1429. In 1477, Emperor Sho Shin came into power. Determined to enforce his philosophical and ethical ideas, while banning feudalism, the emperor instituted a ban on weapons. It became a crime to carry or own weapons such as swords, in an attempt to prevent further turmoil and prevent an uprising.

In 1609, the temporary peace established by Sho Shin was violently overthrown when the powerful Shimazu clan of Satsuma invaded and conquered Okinawa. The Shimazu lords placed a new weapons ban, leaving the Okinawans defenseless against samurai weaponry. In an attempt to protect themselves, the people of Okinawa looked to simple farming implements, which the samurai would not be able to confiscate, as new methods of defense. This use of weapons developed into kobudo, or "ancient martial way" as known today.

Although the bō is now used as a weapon, its use is believed by some to have evolved from the long stick (tenbin) which was used to balance buckets or baskets. Typically, one would carry baskets of harvested crops or buckets of water or fish, etc., one at each end of the tenbin, which is balanced across the middle of the back at the shoulder blades. In poorer agrarian economies, the tenbin remains a traditional farm work implement. In styles such as Yamanni-ryū or Kenshin-ryū, many of the strikes are the same as those used for yari ("spear") or naginata ("glaive").

== Gallery ==
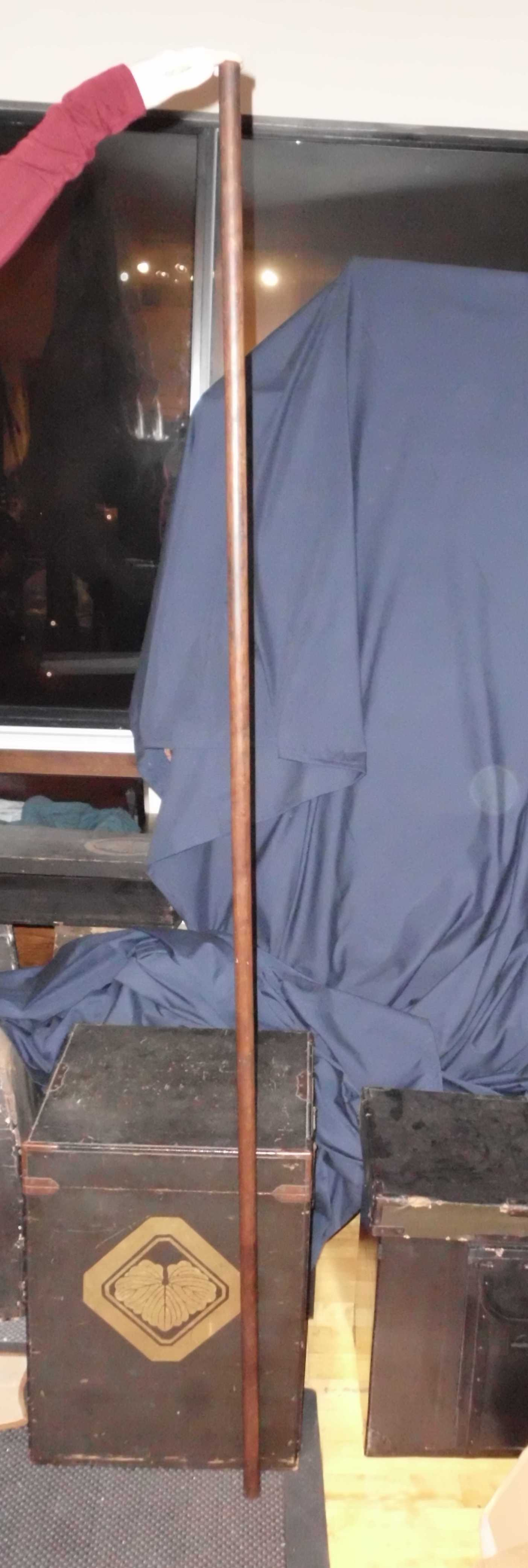
Japanese bō 6 ft tall

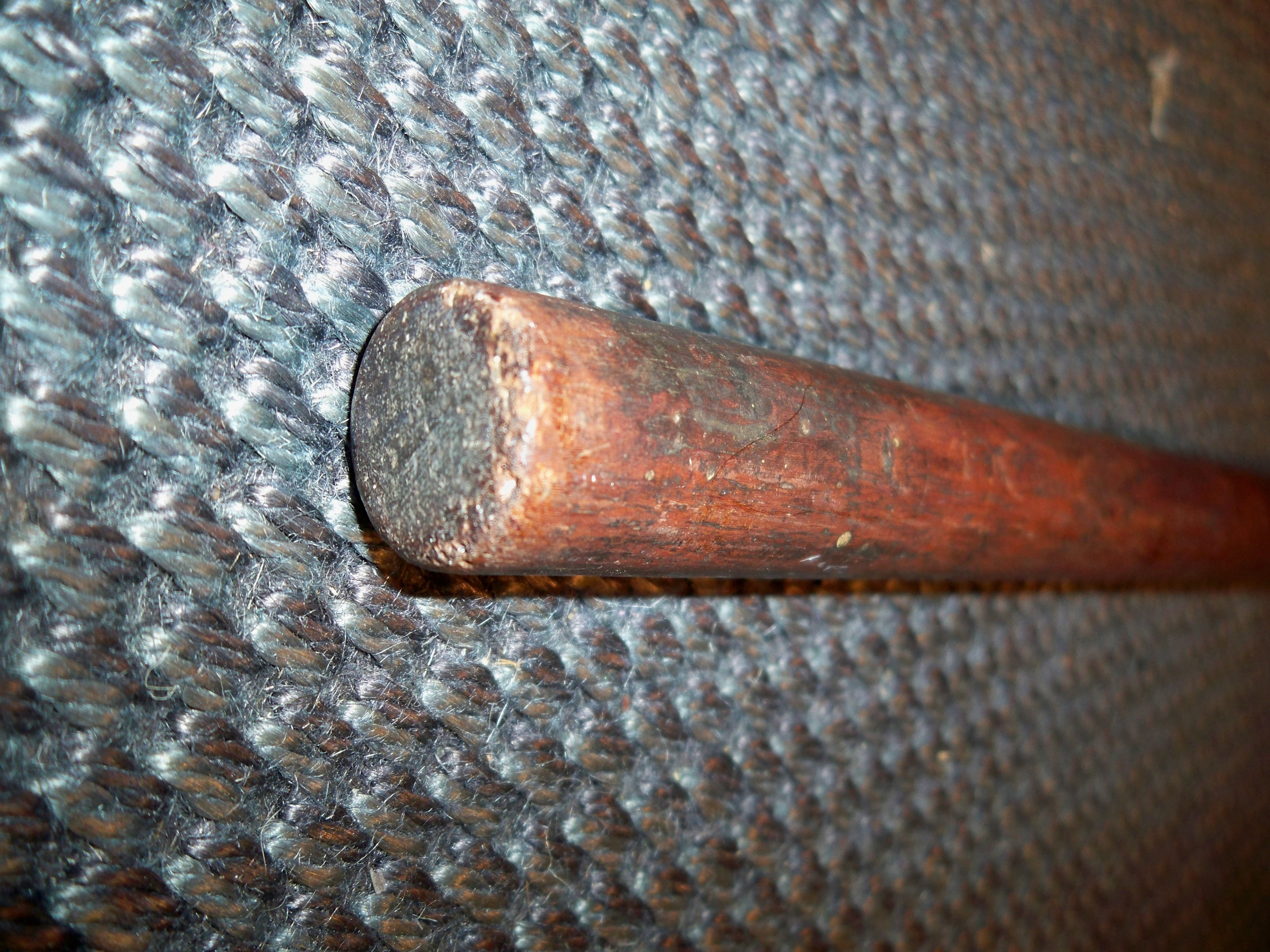
Japanese bō, close up of one end or tip (kontei)

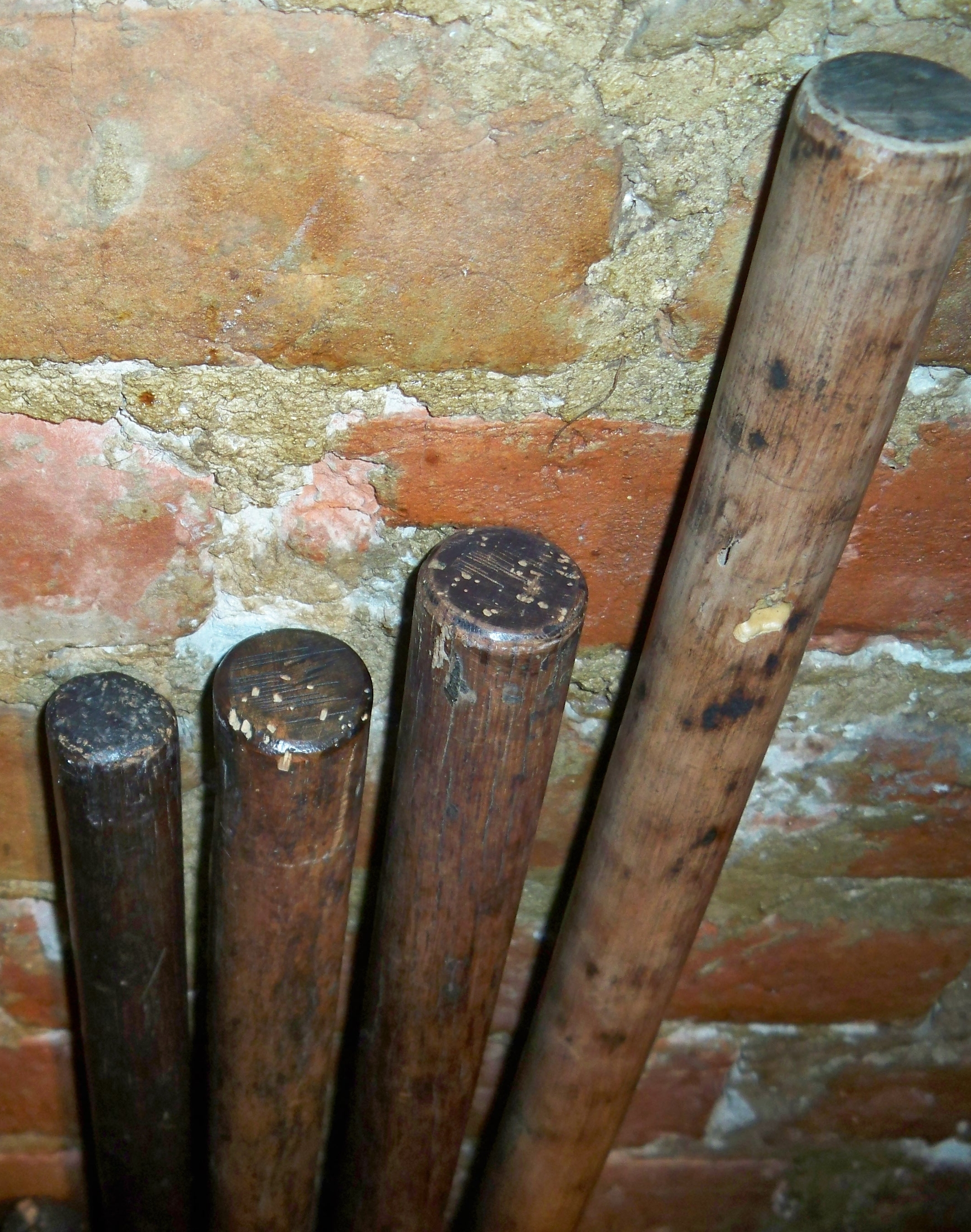
Various antique Japanese bo showing the kontei (end or tip)

== See also ==
- Arnis
- Bōjutsu
- Budō
- Gun (staff)
- Hanbō
- Jō
- Kanabō
- List of martial arts weapons
- Okinawan kobudō
- Quarterstaff
- Stick-fighting
- Tahtib
- Tanbō
- Yubi-bo
- Ruyi Jingu Bang
- Donatello
