= Tanbō =

Japanese staff weapon

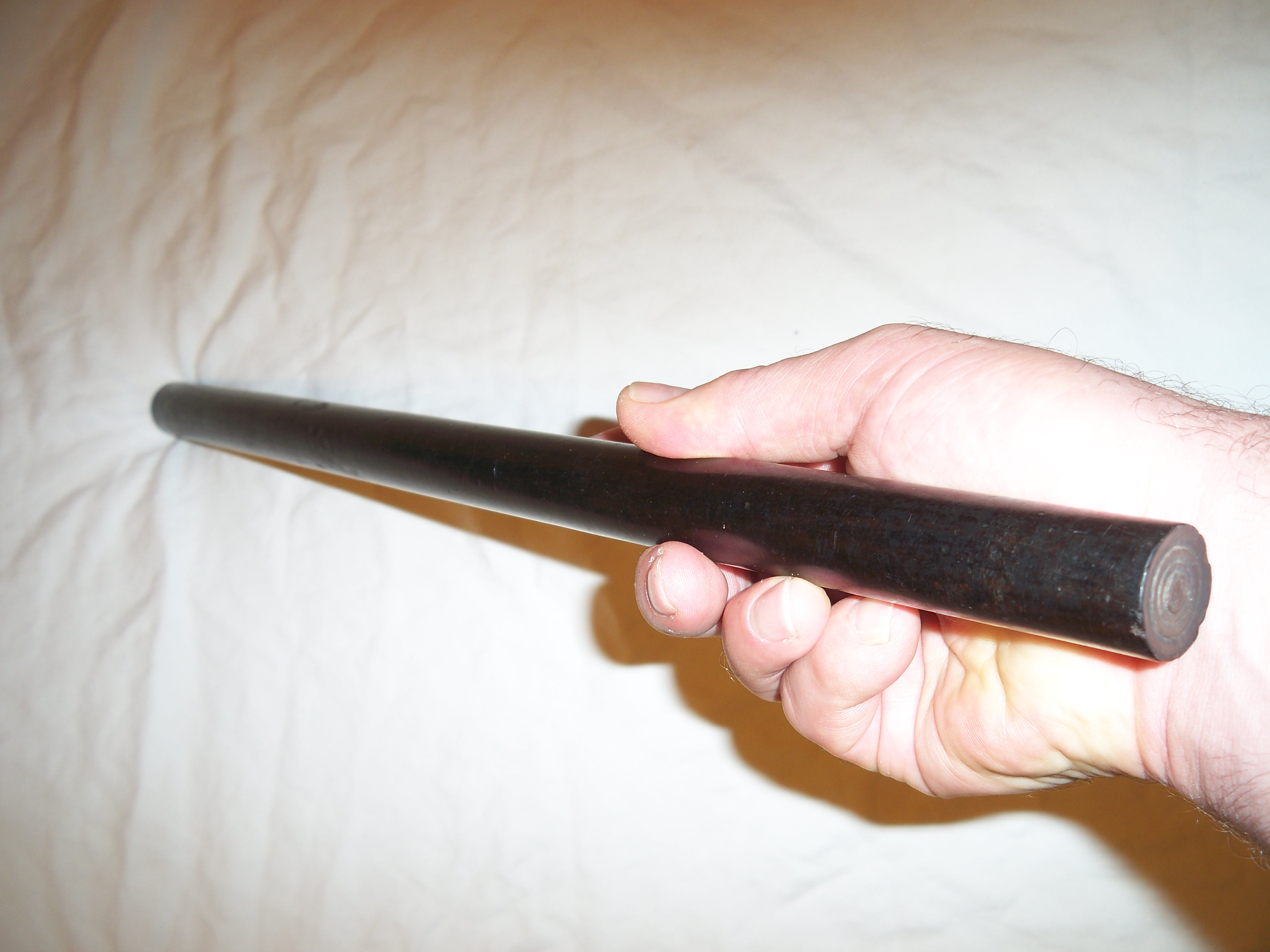
Antique Japanese tanbo, a 45cm-long hard wood martial arts weapon

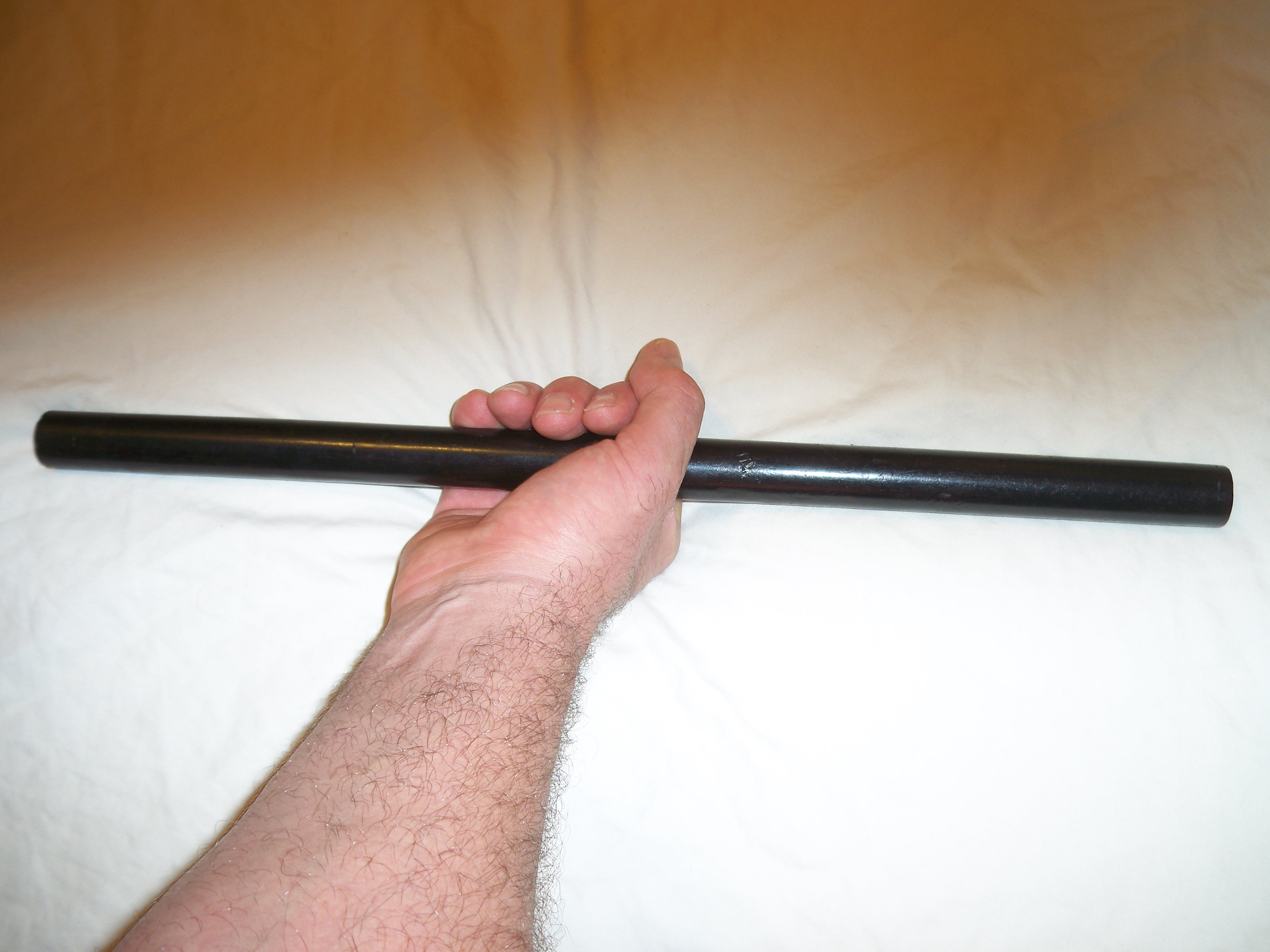

The tanbō (短棒, also tanjō; "short-staff") is a short staff weapon used in Okinawa and feudal Japan. Today the tanbō is used by various martial arts schools.

== Description ==
The tanbō is a short hardwood staff that is used in the same way as the approximately 1 m (3 ft 3 in) hanbō. Short staffs smaller than 1 m (3 ft 3 in) can be called tanbō. There is no official length for a tanbō as different ryū (martial arts schools) use tanbō of various lengths. Tanbō can be individually sized using variations of the "hand to elbow" method.

== Usage ==
The tanbō is used in several martial arts including: jujutsu, aikido, kobudo, hapkido, yoseikan budo, Cuong Nhu.

Tanbō are swung using the elbow and shoulder, or manipulated with the wrist. Many of the motions are similar to sword strokes. The tanbō can be deadly in skilled hands. The main use is to attack the outer edges of the human bones with speed and accuracy. Applying this concept, virtually every part of the target can be hit with this weapon. The tanbō can also be used in pairs.

To use this weapon effectively, the opponent may be imagined as a 2-dimensional object standing in front of the attacker, and the objective is to strike various targets (i.e. the top and back of the head, collarbone, hands, elbows, ribs, hip, kneecaps, and calves). Soft tissues can be targeted, and the attacker can then aim at the abdomen, throat, eyes, thighs and groin.

The tanbō can also be used for thrusting, checks or deflections, pummeling the enemy (with the ends), blocking strikes (while holding both ends), joint locks, chokes and parrying various sorts of attacks. Speed, distance, accuracy, timing and control are the key components in the successful use of this weapon.

== See also ==
- Okinawan kobudō
- Bō
- Budō
- Bujutsu
- Hanbō
- Jō
- Quarterstaff
- Yawara
- Kubotan
- Baston (weapon)

== Bibliography ==
- Nalda, Jose S. (1984). Tambo - jutsu. Spain: Editorial Alas. ISBN 84-203-0164-7.
