= Kubotan =

Self-defense keychain weapon

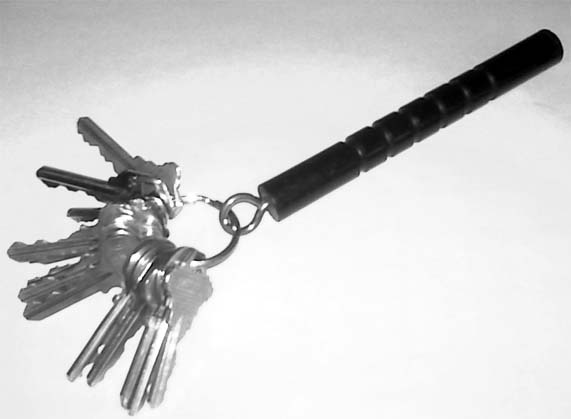
An original Kubotan keychain with keys attached

A Kubotan is a self-defense keychain weapon developed by Sōke Takayuki Kubota in the late 1960s. It is typically no more than 140 millimetres (5 1/2 inches) long and about 13 mm (1/2 in) in diameter, slightly thicker or the same size as a marker pen. The material is usually a hard high-impact plastic such as Lexan. The body of the Kubotan is lined with six round grooves with a screw eye or swivel and split ring attachment at one end for keys. The term is a portmanteau of Kubota (the creator's last name) and of the word Baton, and it is a genericized trademark.

== History ==
The Kubotan keychain was originally based on a small bamboo weapon called a "hashi stick", an invention by Kubota's father, Denjiro. Its popularity grew from 1969 to the 1970s when Kubota, at the request of California State Senator Edward M. Davis, the former Chief of the Los Angeles Police Department, created the weapon and began training female officers in its application.

== Concept ==
Applied as a weapon, some of its uses can be similar to that of the yawara stick, dulo-dulo or koppo stick. The principal targets in self-defence include bony, fleshy, and sensitive parts such as knuckles, forearms, bridge of the nose, shins, stomach, solar plexus, spine, temple, ribs, groin, neck, and eyes. It is 130–150 mm (5–6 in) long and easily concealable in the hand.

The Kubotan is usually held in either an icepick grip (for hammer fist strikes) or a forward grip (for stabbing, pressure point attacks, and seizing). Common uses include hardening the fist (fist load) for punching, attacking vulnerable parts of an assailant's body, and gaining leverage on an assailant's wrist, fingers, and joints. With keys attached, it can function as a flailing weapon. As a pressure point weapon, it can attack any point a finger can, but with greater penetration because of the smaller surface area at the ends.

For example, a law enforcement officer may wrap their arm around a suspect's neck while simultaneously digging the end of the Kubotan into the small of the attacker's back. The officer may also reach around the suspect's neck and underarm from behind and cause pain by stabbing the end of the Kubotan into the top of the pectoral muscle.

In other locking and compliance applications, the body of the Kubotan can be used to create pain. A typical pain compliance technique involves seizing an attacker's wrist and sealing both hands around it with the length of the Kubotan laid across the radius bone. Downward squeezing pressure is applied to the bone to take down the attacker.

== Legality ==
The Kubotan may appear as an innocuous key fob to the untrained eye. In some jurisdictions, however, it may be recognized and considered an offensive weapon. In the United States, there are few legal restrictions on Kubotans, with the notable exception that they are prohibited as carry-on items for air travelers. Whether a non-spiked Kubotan (i.e., a rod) is classed as an offensive weapon in the United Kingdom depends upon the circumstances of the case and is for a jury to decide. In April 2010, actor and entertainer Darren Day was found guilty of possessing an offensive weapon, namely a kubotan-style keyring, by a court in Edinburgh. In the Republic of Ireland, the "hollow kubotan, being a cylindrical container containing a number of sharp spikes" is prohibited under the Firearms and Offensive Weapons Act 1990.

Improvised versions of the Kubotan can be readily found and put to use. Because a Kubotan is just a rod made of a hard material, any restrictive regulation would most likely be ambiguous and undefined due to the ability for any common item to be used in a kubotan-like fashion. In this respect, the Kubotan can be substituted by everyday items such as hairbrushes, pens, markers, flashlights, small wooden dowels, and even electronic cigarettes. Metal pens (i.e., tactical pens) are sometimes marketed as substitutes for the Kubotan.

== Trademark ==
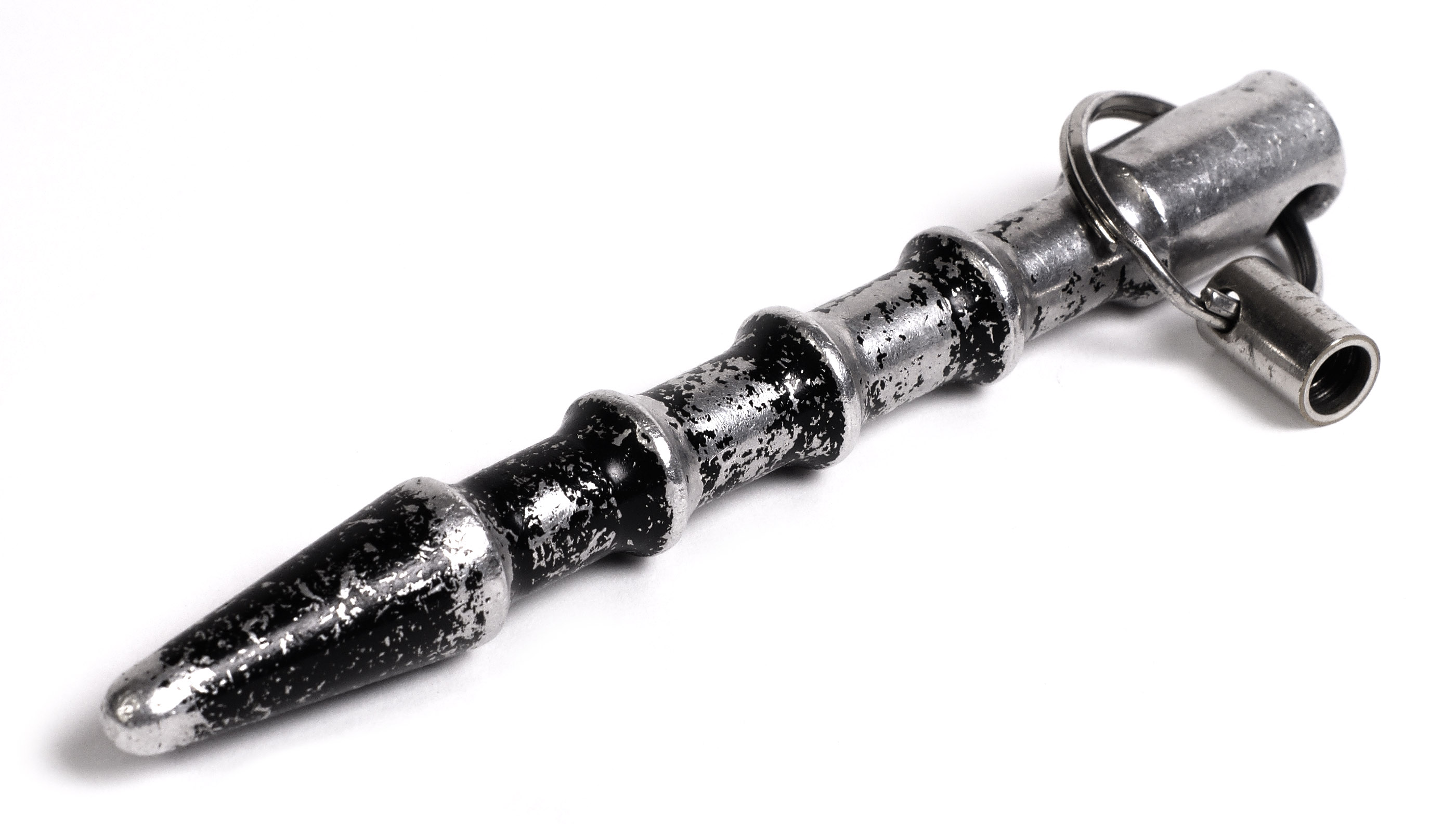
A generic Self-Defense Keychain Stick (SDKS) with tapered end

Over time the registered name "Kubotan" (sometimes erroneously spelled or marketed as "Kubaton") has been eroded and genericized to include many knockoffs and imitations of the original design (IE: Monadnock Persuader™). Some incorporate spikes, tapered ends, and other modifications that were not part of the original invention. "Ninja" keychain weapons, often enhanced with blades, hidden darts, and tear gas, have also been marketed and sold as Kubotans. However, they are copycats and are more properly classified as generic self-defence keychain sticks (SDKS) or generic self-defence pocket weapons. The term 'pocket stick' is also sometimes used to classify such hand weapons.

== Books ==
- Takayuki Kubota & John G. Peters, Jr.: "Official Kubotan Techniques", Reliapon Police Products, 1981, ISBN 0-923401-01-6
- Takayuki Kubota: Kubotan Keychain: Instrument of Attitude Adjustment, Dragon Books, 1985, ISBN 0-946062-09-9
- Takayuki Kubota: Kubotan Keychain, ISBN 0-86568-068-X
- Takayuki Kubota: Action Kubotan Keychain: An Aid in Self Defense: Key Chain – An Aid in Self Defense , Unique Publications, 1997, ISBN 0-86568-101-5
- Bill and Becky Valentine: "Self Defense for Life", Self-Defense Publications, 1991, ISBN 0-9629866-0-7
- Peter Weckauf and Irmengard Hanzal: S.D.S.-CONCEPT Das Buch (inkl. Kubotan), 2009, in German
- Sammy Franco: "Kubotan Power", Contemporary Fighting Arts, 2014, ISBN 978-0-9853472-6-0

== Films ==
- Takayuki Kubota: The Authentic Kubotan Self-Defense Keychain, Unique Publications, ISBN 0100000347
- Kubotan: The official Kubotan, Rising Sun Video Productions, ASIN B00011HJAW
- Georges Sylvain: The Persuader Kubotan & Yawara, Rising Sun Video Productions, ASIN B00065AXWE
- Peter Weckauf: SDS-Concept, BUDO International
