= Taiho-jutsu =

Japanese policing martial art

Taiho-jutsu (Japanese: 逮捕術, lit. 'arresting art') is a term for martial arts developed by Japan's feudal police to arrest dangerous criminals, who were usually armed and frequently desperate.

== History ==
While many taiho-jutsu methods originated from the classical Japanese schools of kenjutsu (swordsmanship) and jūjutsu (unarmed fighting arts), the goal of the feudal police officers was to capture lawbreakers alive and without injury. Thus, they often used specialized implements and unarmed techniques intended to pacify or disable suspects rather than employing more lethal means.

Japanese law enforcement officers trained in self-defense and arresting techniques primarily based on the unarmed fighting styles of jūjutsu. They also developed and perfected the use of a variety of non-lethal implements for capturing and restraining suspects such as jittejutsu (truncheon arts), toritejutsu (restraining arts), and hojōjutsu (binding and tying arts). Feudal era police officers became proficient in a variety of specialized techniques for arresting both armed and unarmed individuals.

Many traditional Japanese martial arts schools once included elements of taiho jutsu, although most have since been lost to history. A number of taiho jutsu techniques have survived, though, and are still taught and practiced in their original forms by specialists in jūjutsu as well as kenjutsu and iaido (swordsmanship).

== Development ==
The modern version of taiho-jutsu was created during the Allied occupation of post World War II Japan.

Japan was being demilitarized, the practice of the martial arts had been prohibited, and the Japanese police force was unable to cope with the outbreaks of violence during that period.

The Tokyo police bureau convened a technical committee headed by kendoist Saimura Goro; judoist Nagaoka Shuichi; Shimizu Takaji, the twenty-fifth headmaster of the Shindo Muso Ryu; Otsuka Hidenori, founder of the Wado Ryu; and Horiguchi Tsuneo, a pistol expert.

This committee reviewed the techniques of classical kenjutsu, jujutsu, and jojutsu, and adapted several techniques from each of these disciplines for police use; the committee also selected techniques from modern disciplines, such as jujutsu, karate, kendo, and judo, for incorporation into the proposed system of self-defense; and further ideas were gained from a study of Western boxing.

A system comprising these elements and called taiho-jutsu was created in 1947, and the Fundamentals of Taiho-jutsu (Taiho-jutsu Kihon Kozo) was published as an official manual for policemen.

Shimizu Takaji and Takayama Kenichi demonstrated jodo for the Police Technical Commission in 1927, and this resulted in the subsequent development of a police combat system using the short staff or jō, keijojutsu, which is still used by the Japanese riot police (although the staff used is somewhat heftier than that used in classical jodo).

Taiho-jutsu has had several revisions since 1947 and is still studied and examined to bring in refinements and adapt it to new conditions of street fighting. It makes great use of the short police baton (Japanese: 警棒, romanized: Keibo, lit. 'Police stick') in a range of techniques called Keibo-soho, as well as the extended baton (Japanese: 特殊警棒, romanized: Tokushu Keibo, lit. 'Special police stick') which was adopted by the Japanese police in 1966.

== In the United States ==
Taiho-jutsu was introduced to the U.S. when the Strategic Air Command began sending combative measures instructors to the Kodokan in Japan for eight-week training programs.

The course was a Japanese-designed mix of judo, karate, aikido and taiho-jutsu. Kodokan officials contacted the JKA to manage the karate instruction. The JKA responded by sending Nishiyama, Obata, Okazaki, and Terada. Judo instruction was provided by Kodokan greats Kotani, Otaki, Takagake, Sato, Shinojima, and Yamaguchi. Aikido instruction was led by Tomiki, along with Yamada and Inuzuka, while the instruction in taiho-jutsu was given by Hosokawa and Kikuchi.

The SAC airmen attended class at the dojo for 8 hours a day, 5 days a week, and at the end of the course had to compete against and be evaluated by ten black belts. Upon returning to the United States, these airmen became instructors at every SAC base where it was important to develop combatives courses for crewmen in training.

The Shudokan Ryu, Taiho Jutsu committee selected techniques that were effective, easy to use and could be adapted to meet the standards set by the California Peace Officer Standards and Training (POST). These same techniques were incorporated into the Shudokan Ryu, Taiho Jutsu system. All techniques taught in the Shudokan Ryu, Taiho Jutsu system are in compliance with the California POST, Use of Force Standard; and are the foundation for Arrest and Control/Defensive Tactics curricula. Techniques not applicable to current law enforcement methods were omitted from the Shudokan Ryu, Taiho Jutsu curricula to limit the potential of excessive force liability.

As military units have different force options and rules of engagement specific to the operation and branch of service, a separate but similar methodology was developed to instruct military members in the art of Shudokan Ryu, Taiho Jutsu. These techniques are taught to military members and units. The police and military curricula have separate focuses and objectives based upon the needs of the entities being instructed.

Current Shudokan Ryu, Taiho Jutsu instructors teach arrest and control tactics at police departments and police academies all over California as well as force options at military units all over the world.

== See also ==
- Judo
- Krav Maga
- Law enforcement in Japan
