= Hanbō =

Japanese staff weapon

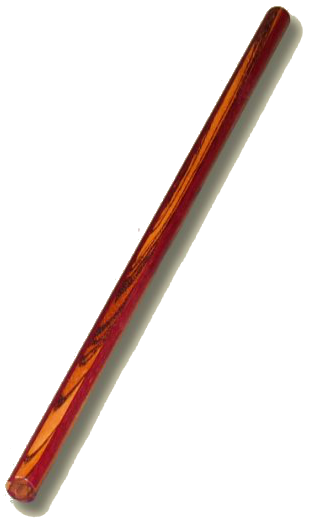

The hanbō (半棒, "half-staff") is a staff used in martial arts. Traditionally, the hanbō was approximately three shaku or about 90 centimetres (35 in) long, half the length of the usual staff, the rokushakubō ("six shaku staff"). Diameter was 2.4 to 3 centimetres (0.94 to 1.18 in). However, depending on the school the length and diameter varied.

As with any weapon, bearers would often find one best suited to their build, opting often for one that comes up to about waist/hip height.

== Usage ==
Hanbōjutsu, the art of wielding the hanbō, is a focus in several martial arts including the Kukishin-ryū koryū classical school of martial arts, and Kukishinden-ryū, one of the nine schools of Bujinkan Budo Taijutsu. Part of the importance in using this length is that it is approximately that of a walking cane. Although techniques with a cane in this ryū-ha utilize pulling or hooking and possess one rounded end, they invariably function the same as a hanbō in all other respects. The hanbō can be held toward one end, and be swung like a katana or a shinai (kendo sword). Additionally, it can be held in the middle like a staff and strike and block from either end.

The hanbō can be used as a means of striking, restraining or even throwing someone. It is useful to know because sticks are abundant and can be picked up if attacked. Masaaki Hatsumi says that one who wishes to be a swordsman should first master hanbō techniques, since it can be held and utilized in a similar fashion to a Japanese sword (but without the cutting edge). When utilized properly (parrying by deflecting the sword by striking the flat parts of the blade), it can be used against a katana.

== See also ==
- Bō
- Budō
- Bujutsu
- Jō
- Tanbō
- Quarterstaff
- Stick fighting
- Bujinkan
- Hontai Yōshin-ryū
- Kukishinden-ryū
- Yawara
