= Yawara =

Japanese weapon

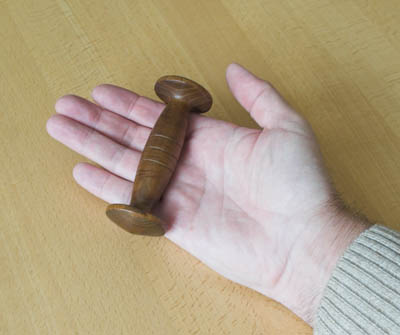
A single dumbbell-shaped yawara stick

The yawara is a Japanese weapon used in various martial arts. Numerous types of jujutsu make use of a small rod, made of wood, that extends somewhat from both ends of a person's fist which is known as a yawara. The yawara likely originated from the use of the tokkosho, a Buddhist symbolic object, by monks in feudal Japan. The tokkosho was used during the Edo period and it was made of brass. Sometimes a short rope or cord would be looped around the user's wrist to distract someone else while in combat. The methods of using a yawara may have been created by samurai that used tantojutsu, which was combat that made use of a short knife. According to another theory, a samurai might have fought with the scabbard "when a more deadly weapon was not necessary".

The yawara stick was popularized for police officers in the 1940s by Frank A. Matsuyama, who made his own version in 1937 or earlier. The upgraded yawara was made of Bakelite plastic and had golf shoe metal spikes on both ends. A yawara can be used by the general public for self-defense in some countries. A variation of the yawara is a kubotan which is about six inches long, made of plastic, weighs about two ounces, and has no sharp edges. The kubotan is used by police officers and the general public. It is considered to be a modern version of a yawara, which is "a little shorter and broader". In the United States, yawaras are not intrinsically illegal in any jurisdiction. In the UK it's illegal for any member of the public to carry a lethal or non-lethal self defence weapon.

== History ==
Numerous types of jujutsu make use of a small rod, made of wood, that extends somewhat from both ends of a person's fist which is known as a yawara. The shaft of a yawara is often "carved to fit a user's fingers and to improve grip". The yawara is around 15–25 cm (5.9–9.8 in) long. Either end of the yawara can "be used to strike or apply pressure to sensitive vital points on an opponent's body". Pressure points that can be easily struck with a yawara are "the forehead, bridge of nose, upper lip, chin, temple, jaw, bicep, solar plexus, elbow, forearm, kidney, wrist, hypocondrium, genitalia, testicles, and knee". When a yawara is "held across the palm", it can "be used to block strikes of blows, even knife and sword slashes". Sometimes a wielder would add a short "rope or cord" that would be looped around the user's wrist, allowing the yawara to be propelled as a distraction while in combat. With the cord setup, the user can easily retrieve the yawara and the cord itself can be used to capture the other person's "limb or weapon as well as to restrain an attacker after they had been subdued". The cord or hook were sometimes called torihimo or "bird rope".

It is believed by some historians that methods of using a yawara were created by samurai that used tantojutsu, which was combat with a short knife. A theory states that the scabbard of a short blade may have swelled from water, resulting in it being hard for a samurai to "draw the blade" from its scabbard. When that happened, the samurai started using the scabbard as a weapon. According to another theory, a samurai might have fought with the scabbard "when a more deadly weapon was not necessary". It is likely that the yawara was based on the tokkosho which was used by Buddhist priests, monks, and pilgrims for incantations and prayers. A tokkosho symbolized the Buddha's ability to destroy evil, but it could also be used in self-defense "as a hand-held weapon". A takkosho was used during the Edo period and it was made of brass. It was an object that was used in rituals.

Due to metal being expensive and requiring forging by tools, wood (of any type) was used to create a yawara. Because it is easy to carve and use a yawara, it has been used as part of multiple self-defense styles in the western world. In feudal Japan, some yawara included miniature claws on one end, allowing someone to "hook the opponent's clothing to pull the attacker off-balance and throw him". The claws could also be used to attack an opponent's face.

=== Police use ===
Assistants of the Japanese police force created various ways to capture a criminal with the rope of the yawara. Japanese immigrant Frank Matsuyama taught the Berkeley, California, police department how to use the yawara in the 1930s. Matsuyama later wrote the book How to Use the Yawara Stick for Police, which details the use of an upgraded yawara that he created in 1937 or earlier for police officers. The upgraded yawara was made of Bakelite plastic and had golf shoe spikes on both ends. The spikes, which were made of metal, were to discourage someone from taking the yawara from the police officer or to cause pain in order to stop a criminal. Matsuyama stated in his book of his upgrade of the yawara, "The Yawara stick is very effective, easy to carry, easy to learn how to use, and easy to remember. It is hard – in fact, almost impossible – for anyone to wrest it from an Officer's grasp. The Yawara stick is better appearing, very inconspicuous, and is not objectionable to the public – even when it is being used". While some yawara have ball bearings on each end, that version has been banned for most police officer usage due to how easily it can penetrate both flesh and bone. A 1985 manual by the University of Illinois titled Police Yawara Stick Techniques, Second Edition details "the advantages and disadvantages of the yawara stick as a weapon". The manual states how police officers can effectively use the yawara and it includes illustrations for each method of use.

=== General public use ===
The yawara has also been created by using hard nylon and aircraft-grade aluminum for use by the general public. Depending on the company, the yawara can be built as either hollow or solid. For self-defense, the yawara can be aimed at the neck, throat, temple, eyes, or nose. A yawabara is easy to hide and might also have an attachment for a keychain. For use by the general public, a yawabara is inexpensive. Martial artist Miguel Ibarra stated of a yawara, "It can give a person who might lack physical size, strength or highly developed technique an edge against an attacker". Martial artist Roy Goldberg said, "Stay away from the types of yawara that have knives or blades concealed inside them. If you practice right, you be very effective with the plain stick; you don't need the blade." Goldberg also said that "there is more risk of being prosecuted for carrying a concealed weapon if you have a yawara with a blade inside". The senior black belt demonstration division of the American Jujitsu Association can demonstrate how to use a yawara among other weapons.

A variation of the yawara is a kubotan which is "about six inches long, made of plastic, weighs about two ounces, and has no sharp edges. The kubotan is used by police officers and the general public. It is considered to be a modern version of a yawara, which is "a little shorter and broader".

== Etymology ==
The kanji for yawara and ju in jujutsu or judo is the same (柔). The kanji also translates to "flexibility" or "giving way". Another term for yawara is tenouchi which translates to "inside the hand".

== Legality ==
In the United States, yawaras are not intrinsically illegal in any jurisdiction.

== See also ==
- Baston (weapon)
- Hanbō
- Kubotan
- List of martial arts weapons
