= Jō =

Wooden staff used in some Japanese martial arts

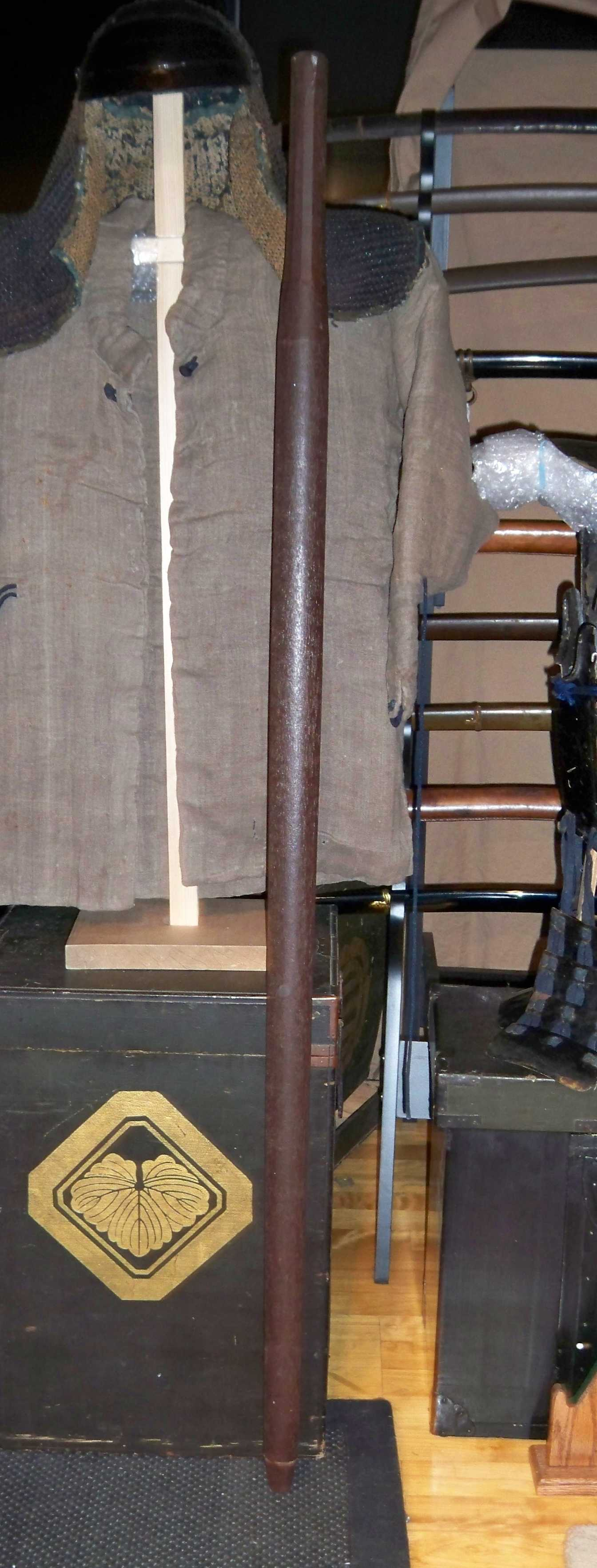
Japanese jō, 127.6 cm (50.2 in) tall and 15 cm (5.9 in) in circumference, made in the form of a large walking stick

A jō (杖(じょう)) is an approximately 1.27-metre (4.2 ft) wooden staff, used in some Japanese martial arts. The martial art of wielding the jō is called jōjutsu or jōdō. Also, aiki-jō is a set of techniques in aikido which uses the jō to illustrate aikido's principles with a weapon. The jō staff is shorter than the six-foot rokushakubō. Today, the jō is still used by some Japanese police forces.

== Legendary origin ==
The techniques for jō were reportedly invented by Musō Gonnosuke Katsuyoshi (夢想 權之助 勝吉, fl. c.1605, date of death unknown) after he was defeated by the famous swordsman, Miyamoto Musashi (宮本 武蔵, 1584–1645). They fought each other in a duel sometime between 1608 and 1611, according to Kenji Tokitsu. The record mentioning this duel, the Nitenki (二天記), recounts:

When Musashi was in Edo, he met an adept named Musō Gonnosuke, who asked to fight him. Gonnosuke used a wooden sword. Musashi was in the process of making a small Bō; he picked up a piece of firewood. Gonnosuke attacked him without even bowing, but he received a blow from Musashi that made him fall down. He was impressed and left.

A different text, the Kaijo Monogatari (dated to 1666) differs considerably from the Nitenki version. In it, Gonnosuke is a boastful and brash warrior who duels Musashi intending to see how Musashi compares with Musashi's father in swordsmanship. The fight occurs in Akashi, not Edo, and Gonnosuke wields a staff four shaku in length and reinforced with steel rings. After his defeat, he then went to Mount Hōman-zan in Chikuzen (near Fukuoka), where he practiced considerably, changing his preferred weapon to four shaku and two sun in length – 1.27 m (4 ft 2 in) as compared to 1.21 m (4 ft 0 in).

The school he founded to transmit his techniques has some old records which claims that Gonnosuke, struck by his defeat, went into solitary meditation until he received divine inspiration in a dream; he then invented techniques to fight against Musashi's two swords using only a stick, and defeated Musashi on their next encounter. Assuming the records are accurate and genuine, this would be the only time Musashi was defeated, as the vast majority of documentation states that Musashi was never defeated.

== Subsequent history ==
Two jō

Several traditional Japanese koryū ("old schools" of martial arts) used the jō like a sword. The added length of the jō was meant to give it an advantage over the sword. Further, its wood construction allowed a fighter to improvise a jō quickly from a tree, branch, or other pole.

== See also ==
- Bō
- Bokken, a type of waster used in budō.
- Hanbō
- Quarterstaff
- Shinai
- Tanbō
