= Jukenpo =

Japanese martial art

Jūkenpo 柔拳法
- Focus: Empty handed/open-handed striking and stand up grappling
- Country of origin: Japan
- Parenthood: Jūjutsu, Aikinojutsu, Quan fa
- Olympic sport: No

Jūkenpo (柔拳法, jūkenpo or sometimes jūkempo) is a Japanese martial art. Its name can be translated as "the Way of the soft fist" or "the soft boxing".

== History ==
Jukenpo is thought to draw its origins from a combination of Jūjutsu, Aikinojutsu principles and the Chinese boxing arts. It was one of the fighting arts used by the horsemen to unseat their enemies and for close range combat.

As Jukempo became tactically less interesting, it moved to a ground fighting method.

== Jukenpo today ==
Jukenpo is actually part of the Takeda Ryu Nakamura Ha Sobudo and is considered a complement to the Aikido taught in this school. Jukenpo strikes are used to divert an opponent before a decisive action such as a sword cut, a throw or a joint break.

The combination of Aikido and Jukenpo is often named Jūjutsu Kenpo (柔術拳法).

=== Technical aspects ===
Jukenpo uses strikes, throws, locks and chokes. As a descendant of the Chinese boxing, punches and kicks are fundamental in this art.

The basic punches are:

- Tate Ken Tate Uchi: "hammer" blow to the top of the fontanel.
- Tate Ken Yoko Uchi: "hammer" blow to the temple.
- Tate Ken Gyaku Yoko Uchi: cross "hammer" blow to the temple.
- Tate Ken Yoko Uchi: "hammer" blow to the ribs.
- Tate Ken Gyaku Yoko Uchi Chudan: cross hammer blow to the ribs.
- Tate Ken Jodan Tsuki: punch to the face with the hand in a vertical position.
- Tate Ken Chudan Tsuki: punch to the abdomen with the hand in a vertical position.
- Yoko Ken Jodan Tsuki: punch to the face with the hand in an horizontal position.
- Yoko Ken Chudan Tuski: punch to the abdomen with the hand in a horizontal position.
- Yoko Ken Yoko Uchi: punch to the temple, similar to an hook in boxing.
- Yoko Ken Age Uchi: punch to the chin, similar to an uppercut.
- Uraken Mukae Uchi: reverse punch to the nose.
- Uraken Age Uchi: reverse punch to the jaw.

The basic kicks are :

- Ate Geri Chudan: front kick to the abdomen.
- Harai Geri Gedan: low lateral kick to the knee.
- Harai Geri Chudan: lateral kick to the ribs.
- Ori Geri Gedan: pushing kick to the kneecap.
- Ori Geri Chudan: pushing kick to the abdomen.

There are several other strikes such as Higi Uchi (elbow strikes), Hiza Geri (knee kicks) that are not included in the basic techniques and considered as Koryu Waza.

Jukenpo relies on relaxed movements to increase speed and allow faster sequences. The tension exists only during the impact. This principle is opposite to the "one hit, one kill" philosophy of Karate.

=== Teaching methods ===
The Kihon Waza (basic techniques) are designed to acquire the basic principles of the techniques. The first approach is to repeat the hits and blocks alone. In order to improve the basics, the techniques are then practised with a partner. One of the partners is the attacker and the other one the defender. This training is scheduled and conventional.

After that, the training focuses on Kaeshi Waza to develop the Sen no Sen feelings. These exercises aim to hit the attacker exactly at the moment he takes the initiative.

At mid-level, Kumite Randori (free partner sparring) is practiced in the form of Ju Ippon Kumite (soft, one hit, free sparring) and Ju Kumite (soft free sparring). Shiai Kumite is another part of the teaching. Shiai Kumite is a way to train as close as possible of a real fight. The opponents wear at least hands, feet and teeth protectors to avoid injuries.

The highest and most advanced level of technique is Koryū Waza. Koryū Waza are ancient techniques, designed for maximal efficiency and damages with a minimal effort. They originate from battlefields.
