= Shinto (disambiguation) =

Shinto is the native religion and former state religion of Japan that is characterized by a veneration of nature spirits, or kami.

Shinto or Shintō may also refer to:

- Shintō, Gunma, a village in Gunma Prefecture, Japan
- Shinto (character) or Tenshinhan, a character in Dragon Ball media
- A Javanese spelling of the Hindu goddess Sita.

== See also ==
- Shinto gods or kami
- Shinto in Taiwan
- Shinto music
- Shintō Musō-ryū
- Shintō Musō-ryū Jo Kata
