= Shugijutsu =

Japanese martial art

Shugijutsu 手木術
- Also known as: Tanbojutsu
- Focus: Weaponry
- Country of origin: Japan
- Parenthood: Jōjutsu
- Olympic sport: No

Shugijutsu (Tanbojutsu) is a Japanese martial art which uses short sticks. It is a part of jōdō. The techniques were used by farmers in Kai Province (today Yamanashi Prefecture), the land of the Takeda clan, when they had to fight against thieves and bandits. They picked up any stick available and defended themselves. Very efficient locks for throwing the opponent to the ground, strikes and blocks also comprise this martial art.

It is thought that the actual shugi was developed to imitate the shape of the tantō scabbard which was used in close combat.

In Takeda Ryu Nakamura Ha Sobudo, shugijutsu uses at least two short sticks with an oval section. The special geometry of the sticks increase the pain during locks and blocks. On some occasions, sticks can be used as throwing weapons.

The martial art practiced by the Athosians in the science-fiction program Stargate: Atlantis is based on this discipline.
