= Hōten-ryū =

Japanese martial art founded in 1600 CE

Hōten-ryū 法典流
- Ko-ryū
- Tachibana Kujuuin Hoten - 14th Headmaster.

Foundation
- Founder: Takizawa Minokami Hōten
- Date founded: c. 17th century
- Period founded: Sengoku period

Current information
- Current headmaster: Tachibana Kujuuin Hoten

Arts taught
- Art: Description
- Kenjutsu: Sword art
- Iaijutsu: Sword-drawing art
- Hibuki & Kobuki: Hidden & old weapons
- Jojutsu: Short-staff art
- Kusari & Kusarifundo: Chain&Weighted-chain
- Jutte, Tessen & Kodachi: Truncheon, Iron-fan&Short Sword
- Sasumata: Two-horned polearm
- Nagehari: Throwing spikes
- Sōjutsu: Spear art
- Kusarigama: Weighted-chain and sickle
- Tekken: Iron-fist

Hōten-ryū (法典流) is a Japanese martial art founded in 1600 CE. It is a school based on the use of the sword; however it has several different kobuki (old weapons) in its curriculum. It is also notable for its hidden weapons (hibuki) or items that appear to hide among everyday things.

== History ==
According to legend, Hōten-ryū was created by a Takizawa Minokami Hōten in the Kii mountain range (Nanzen) of Japan at the end of the Sengoku era. Takizawa was a bushi of the Tachibana family and allegedly a friend of Sesshusai Yagyū of Yagyū Shinkage-ryū fame. Takizawa had learned the martial arts taught in his han (prefecture) and then went to Mount Kiso Ontake to better study himself. He made a pilgrimage to Ontake Shrine and Ontake waterfall in an attempt to purify his spirit and body. At Ontake it is believed that Takizawa decided to become a mountain priest. He then created the techniques for Hōten-ryū based on Shintō teachings and Shugendō practices, conforming his methods to the "laws of nature" to which the mountain ascetics adhered. The school was taught privately in a shrine near the Kiso-Ontake until the 13th inheritor Totsugawa Hōten made his way to Kyōto and found a student in a very young Kazuo Taniguchi. Totsugawa, the 13th Sōke, became frail with age and Kazuo succeeded him as the 14th Sōke when he was 19 years old, just before being conscripted into the Japanese military during World War II. As the Sōke of Hōten-ryū, Kazuo took on the name Tachibana Kujuuin Hoten and resided in Kyōto, Japan where he had been teaching Hōten-ryū and Shodō since the end of World War II until his death in May 2013.

== Curriculum and weaponry ==
Hōten-ryū first focuses on training with the sword, but there are many kobuki (old weapons) and hibuki (hidden weapons). There are several primary categories which introduce multiple sub-categories and in effect creates a large curriculum. However, the techniques for each "sub-category" weapon are simple and interchangeable because the heihō (strategy) of the ryū is transmitted with each primary weapon. A short list of the armament techniques include: Jo (short staff), Ken (sword), Kusari (chain- flexible weapons), Kusarifundo (weighted chain-flexible weapons), Jutte (truncheon), Tessen (iron fan), Sasumata (two-horned polearm), Nagehari (thrown weapons), Sōjutsu (spear), Kusarigama (sickle and chain), Tekken ("iron fist" similar to Western brass-knuckles) and Taijutsu (unarmed defense), among others. A notable category is the sanki or "three tools" (also called sandogu) which are generally affiliated with the early Japanese police.

== Training ==
The training methods for Hōten-ryū focus on striking and mechanics of the weapons, which is done in solo practice at first, utilizing natural targets. Afterwards, the kata themselves are then done in pairs as an extension of the solo practice. There are 10 steps in teaching, each based on the progression of the weapons and the skill level of the practitioner with them.

The hidden weapons of Hōten-ryū are concealable and tough, generally handmade (outside of the sword and tessen) out of rough iron or natural materials. So, the creating of weapons is in fact part of the training and tradition of the ryū. For example, the jō (short staff) is made using tree branches, which makes it different from most other ryūha that use milled or machine-made versions. That is to say, the jo is rough, and usually bent; the curvature of the wood is part of the techniques used within the school, so there is a unique shape that is sought after, one that is found in nature. Many other weapons made of wood require flexibility/pliability so there is a method to finding the right wood and creating them. The use of natural rope is also a part of the ryū, so skill in finding materials and making it is required. A basic understanding of traditional iron working is necessary; however the advent of modern machinery has sped up the process. Filing and other methods (such as design) are still taught and used, and traditional tools are also taught, though modern methods are faster and get better results. Many of the weapons are concealed as everyday objects (or resembled the everyday objects of their era) so the altering and use of "existing" objects is also important.

Shōdo is also part of the training regimen and the writing and understanding of old kanji is essential. This coincides with okuden (verbal teachings) of the ryū and it is essential to transmit the heiho (strategy) within the school.

== Documents and scrolls ==
Hōten-ryū is and was a private school. None of the previous headmasters felt the need to list their names in encyclopedias of the martial arts or to join large martial arts organizations in the mid-twentieth century. Therefore, not much was known or recorded about the school outside the school itself until the 1940s, when the 14th Sōke began teaching publicly and accepting more than the customary handful of students at any one time. Most of the techniques of Hōten-ryū are simple and conform to the mechanics of the weapon being used. Therefore, no major Densho (scrolls describing the techniques) were clearly recorded. The use of the weapons is handed down orally, in the form of kuden (oral teachings). Despite this tradition, there are three primary scrolls concerning Hōten-ryū: Hōten Ryū Yuraisho (Hōten-ryū founding and history), Nancho Hokucho (secrets of the imperial family/history of the Southern and Northern court wars), and Gōdaigen (strategy and philosophy of the ryū). In the Gōdaigen, the majority of the techniques are encrypted for the ryū, naming and outlining basic principles that are taught along with the oral teachings.

== Weapons ==
There are a number of weapons taught in the school. The primary weapon is the sword, but there are many other weapons. In particular, the curriculum includes a large number of flexible weapons.

A partial list of weapons includes:

- Bladed Weapons
  1. Katana (Sword)
- Blunt weapons
  1. Tsue or Jo (Walking Stick)
  2. Rokushakubo (Staff)
  3. Tetsujo (Iron Truncheon)
  4. Tessen (Iron Fan)
  5. Te-Sasumata (Handheld Forked Weapon)
  6. Tekken (Knuckledusters)
- Flexible weapons
  1. Nichokusari (Double-Weighted Chain)
  2. Himofundo (Weighted Rope)
  3. Momiji (Rope with Serrated Weight - a subset of the Himofundo)
  4. Nichojobin (Chains with Handles - Paired)
  5. Nikon (Flail, similar to Ryukyu nunchaku)
  6. Tebyou (Short Double-Weighted Chain)
  7. Bo-Kusari (Chain with Handle)
  8. Shakuri (Light chain with handle)
  9. Kusarigama (Weighted-chain with Sickle)
- Thrown Weapons
  1. Nagebari (Throwing Needles)
