= Takeda Ryu Nakamura Ha =

- Nippon Sobudo Rengokai logo
- Date founded: 1978
- Country of origin: Japan
- Founder: Nakamura Hisashi
- Current head: Nakamura Shuji
- Arts taught: Sobudo (Complete Martial Way): Aikido/Iaido/Jodo/Jukenpo/Tachi-Kendo/ Shugijutsu/Shurikenjutsu
- Official website: Nippon Sobudo Rengokai Takeda Ryu Nakamura Ha

Takeda Ryu Nakamura Ha (literally, "the Nakamura descendant of the Takeda school") is a gendai (modern) martial art developed by Nakamura Hisashi in the mid to late 20th century.

== Takeda Ryu history ==
The genyōsha (society of the Dark Ocean) was founded by Hiraoka Kotarō (1851–1906) and Toyama Mitsuru (1855–1944), and other former samurai of the Fukuoka domain as the "Koyōsha", it agitated for a return to the old feudal order with special privileges and government stipends for the samurai class. The Koyōsha participated in the various ex-samurai uprising against the early Meiji government.

In 1881, the Koyōsha changed its direction. This time, the declared aims of the Genyōsha were honorable and noble: "to honor the Imperial Family, respect the Empire" and "to guard the rights of the people". However the real aim of genyōsha was the expansion of Japan.

The first head martial arts teacher of the Genyosha dojo was Takeda Tadakatsu (descendant of Takeda Shingen's father, Takeda Nobutora), and 41st generation of Takeda. In consequence, the martial arts taught at the Genyosha dojo were: Aiki no Jutsu and Ju Jutsu from the Takeda Family, Ken Jutsu (Shinto Ryu), Jo Jutsu (Muso Shinto Ryu, Uchida Ryu), Tessen Jutsu (variation of Ikkaku Ryu jutte jutsu & Isshin Ryu Kusarigama Jutsu).

At Takeda Tadakatsu's death, Nakamura Aikisai Okichi (born Nakamura Yoshitoshi) received the Takeda's Makimono and became the 2nd head martial art teacher of the Genyosha dojo. In 1935, Oba Ichio (Oba Sachiyuki), sponsored by Toyama Mitsuru, became the 3rd head teacher of the Genyosha in Fukuoka prefecture.

After the end of the War and Toyama's death Oba opened the Dojo (1948) to general public and called its teaching "Takeda Ryu". The ryu was established on the basis of several schools in which Oba Ichio had a menkyo kaiden (Takeda family's aiki no jutsu and ju jutsu, Muso Shinto ryu, Kukishin ryu). He was also involved in the Zen Nihon Butoku Kai (formerly Dai Nippon Butoku Kai) in 1930's and he established the Nihon Budo Renren in 1950s.

== Takeda Ryu Nakamura-Ha history ==
Nakamura Hisashi born 18 March 1932 in Nagano and went in his aunt home in 1949. He entered in 1950 the Yamagura Dojo of Oba that had been opened to general public for one year. The arts thought by Oba where: Aiki no Jutsu, Ju Jutsu Kenpo, Ken Jutsu, Batto Jutsu, Jo Jutsu, Shugi Jutsu and Shuriken Jutsu.

In 1953 Nakamura Hisashi was accepted as uchi deshi. In 1956, Nakamura Hisashi went to Tokyo to help Oba in the Seibuden dojo in replacement of Moritomo Kazuo.

Oba died in 1959, and appointed Moritomo Kazuo as successor. Moritomo declined the position and appointed Nakamura Hisashi as the next Soke.

Nakamura developed a new way of teaching Aiki no jutsu and called it Aikido (not to be confused with the more common aikido of Morihei Ueshiba).

In 1961, Nakamura established the first Aikido dojo at Rikkyo University (Tokyo) and, in 1962, the second Aikido dojo at Nihon University. In 1963 he established the Japanese Federation for Aikido (Nihon Aikido Renmei). Nakamura believed that randori (free exercises) and shiai (competition) were able to increase physical and mental strength. He organized the first All Japan Aikido Championship (Aiki Yusho Taikai). In 1970, Nakamura changed the name of its organization from Nihon Aikido Renmei to Nihon Sobudo Rengokai. In 1978, Nakamura registered its way of teaching and its budo system as Takeda Ryu Nakamura-Ha.

In 1990, Morimoto Kazuo died, leaving Nakamura as the last teacher of Koryu do Takeda Ryu Bujutsu.

Nowadays, Takeda Ryu Nakamura Ha is taught in Japan by Nippon Sobudo Rengokai (NSR).

And Worldwide through the NSR (Nippon Sobudo Rengokai) Europe Africa led by Okuden Shihan Debo Ohgen Minamoto no Harumitsu (Valmy Debot), under the lead of Nakamura.

In Europe, several other groups have split from the original line: Maroto Ha, Kobilza Ha.

== Takeda Ryu Nakamura Ha Sobudo ==
Seven disciplines are taught inside the Takeda Ryu Nakamura Ha Sobudo. These disciplines are Aikido, Jukenpo, Iaidō, Jōdō, Shugijutsu, Tachikendo and Shurikenjutsu.

Techniques are divided in kihon waza (basic techniques), henka waza (variations) and koryū waza (old techniques). The school uses competitions (shiai) and randori as a way of teaching, it is the only way to be close to the true fighting situation. In aikido, the shiai and the randori exist in two different forms. The first one is called sogo and the second tori waza.

In Japanese, sogo means integrated. In this form of practice, opponents wear a leather glove (uchi kote) on ONE hand and hit freely with that hand. They are also allowed to throw and to lock. The tori waza is a technical match where opponents take alternatively the role of uke and tori.

=== Ranking System ===
There are two ranking systems in Takeda Ryu Nakamura Ha Sobudo, Kyudaho System and Menkyo System.

==== Kyudaho System (Kyu/Dan ranks) ====
This ranking system uses colored belts and Dan (rank) black belts.

Belt Color	Rank
White	8th Kyu
	7th Kyu
	6th Kyu
	5th Kyu
	4th Kyu
Brown	3rd Kyu
Brown	2nd Kyu
Blue	1st Kyu
Black	1st Dan
	2nd Dan
	3rd Dan
	4th Dan
	5th Dan
	6th Dan
	7th Dan
	8th Dan
	9th Dan (only an honorary title)

==== Menkyo System ====
The Menkyo is not a rank, it is a teaching licence delivered by Nakamura to individuals.

Menkyo Name	Title
Shoden Menkyo	Shoden Kyohan
Chuden Menkyo	Chuden Kyohan
Joden Menkyo	Joden Shihan
Okuden Menkyo	Okuden Shihan
Kaiden Menkyo	Kaiden Shihan

=== Danshinsa (examinations) ===
Every discipline has particular rules for examination but there are always two steps :

- The first step is a playoff Shiai : all the candidates are required to participate to the playoff. To be allowed to go to the final test, the candidate should obtain three wins or at least two wins and one draw against opponents of the same rank. The successful candidates are then admitted to the next event.
- The second step is the technical test : the groups of kata are drawn at random within the related rank's kata. In this test, the main criteria are precision, quality of execution, dynamic and spirit. If the presentation meets these criteria, the candidates are promoted to higher.
