= Hōzōin In'ei =

Japanese Buddhist teacher and monk

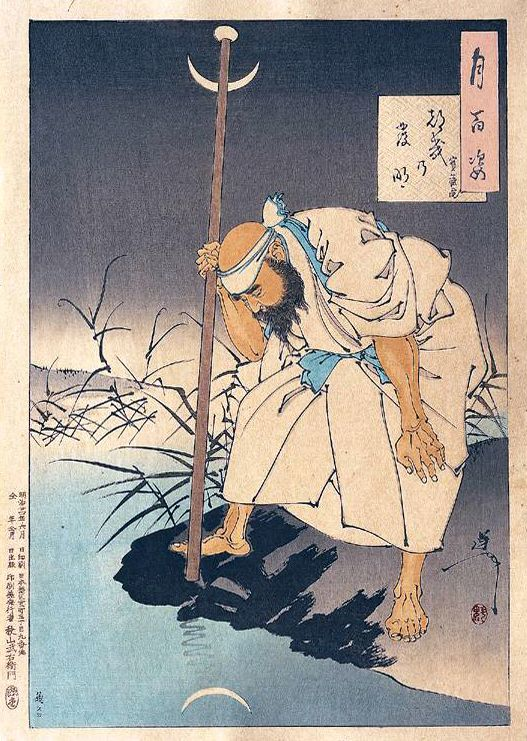
In'ei watching the reflection of the moon. One Hundred Aspects of the Moon, by Yoshitoshi

Hōzōin Kakuzenbō In'ei (宝蔵院覚禅房胤栄; 1521 – 16 October 1607) was a Buddhist monk and sōhei, abbot of Hōzōin temple, and guardian of all the temples of Nara. In the 1560s he founded Hōzōin-ryū, a school which taught the art of the spear, also known as Sōjutsu.

In'ei was born in the first year of Daiei (1521) as the second son of Nakamikado Tajima Inei who was a warrior monk of the Kōfuku-ji. In'ei was a monk of Kōfuku-ji Temple in Nara, Japan. He adored martial arts and trained in the sword martial arts of Nen-ryū under Toda Yosaemon and Tenshin Shōden Katori Shintō-ryū under Izasa Ienao. At the same time, he was coached and mentored by Daizendayū Moritada, a master of the spear. Under this master's guidance, In'ei honed his spearmanship. According to legends, at dawn of the 12th day of the first month of 22nd year of Tenbun (1553) the 33 year old In'ei was initiated to two secret techniques by Moritada, thought to be the incarnation of Marishi-Ten. In'ei was noted for having arranged the meeting between Kamiizumi Nobutsuna and Yagyū Munetoshi, being the catalyst for the creation of Yagyū Shinkage-ryū.

It is said that one evening, on seeing the reflection of the crescent moon shining on Sarusawa pond in Kōfuku-ji, he was inspired to create a spear with a cross-shaped spearhead. He imagined this style of spear would be more effective in fighting. With this new type of spear (known as jumonji-yari (十文字槍)), he founded the Hōzōin-ryū, based on the teachings of the Shintōryū and the Shinkageryū.

The development of the Sōjutsu of Hōzōin-ryū was very successful, until in 1585 Hashiba Hidenaga became lord of Kōriyama castle and ordered the temples and Shintō shrines as well as the ordinary people of the province of Yamato to surrender all weapons. The pressure led to an abandonment of martial arts training in temples and shrines. In 1586 the highest Buddhist title of Hōin was bestowed on the 75 year old In'ei. At this time he was requested by Konparu Dayū Yasuteru to instruct his son Shichirō Ujikatsu. Because of Konparu's reputation and influence (even on Tokugawa Ieyasu), at the age of 75 revived the Sōjutsu training. From then on the number of his disciples increased in a way that people said "the number of those training in this art not only fills a platoon but fills a whole army". In 1604, young Miyamoto Musashi immediately went to Nara and visited the 84 years old In'ei. Due to the old age of the first headmaster of the Hōzōin-ryū and due to the youth of his successor (Inshun was only 16) the man who met Musashi's challenge was Okuzōin Dōei. The legend of Musashi and his visit increased the fame of the school, often mentioned in the stories about Musashi, from Eiji Yoshikawa's novel Musashi to the manga Vagabond.

One year prior to his death (in 1607) In'ei forbade sōjutsu training. This should have led to the extinction of at least the monastery line of the school. However, after In'ei's death, his nephew, Hōzōin Inshun restarted his trainings and lifted the order. Inshun continued the monastery line and further trained his disciples who became masters of the secular line, still alive today. In'ei and his successors (including Inshun) are buried in the graveyard of the temple Byakugōji in Nara, where modern Hozoinryu members still venerate them and care for the graves. The school also cares for other memorials, Marishiten boulder (embodiment of the deity Marishiten from the Hōzōin temple to which In'ei prayed), and the memorial stone on the grounds of the Hōzōin.

== Bibliography ==
- Frederic, Louis (2002). Japan Encyclopedia. Cambridge, Massachusetts: Harvard University Press.
- De Lange, William. Famous Swordsmen of the Sengoku Period.
