= Zen Nihon kendō renmei Jōdō =

Zen Nihon Kendō Renmei Jōdō, or Seitei Jōdō in short, is a modern form of jōdō created by Japanese martial artist Shimizu Takaji and presented to the All Japan Kendo Federation in 1968.

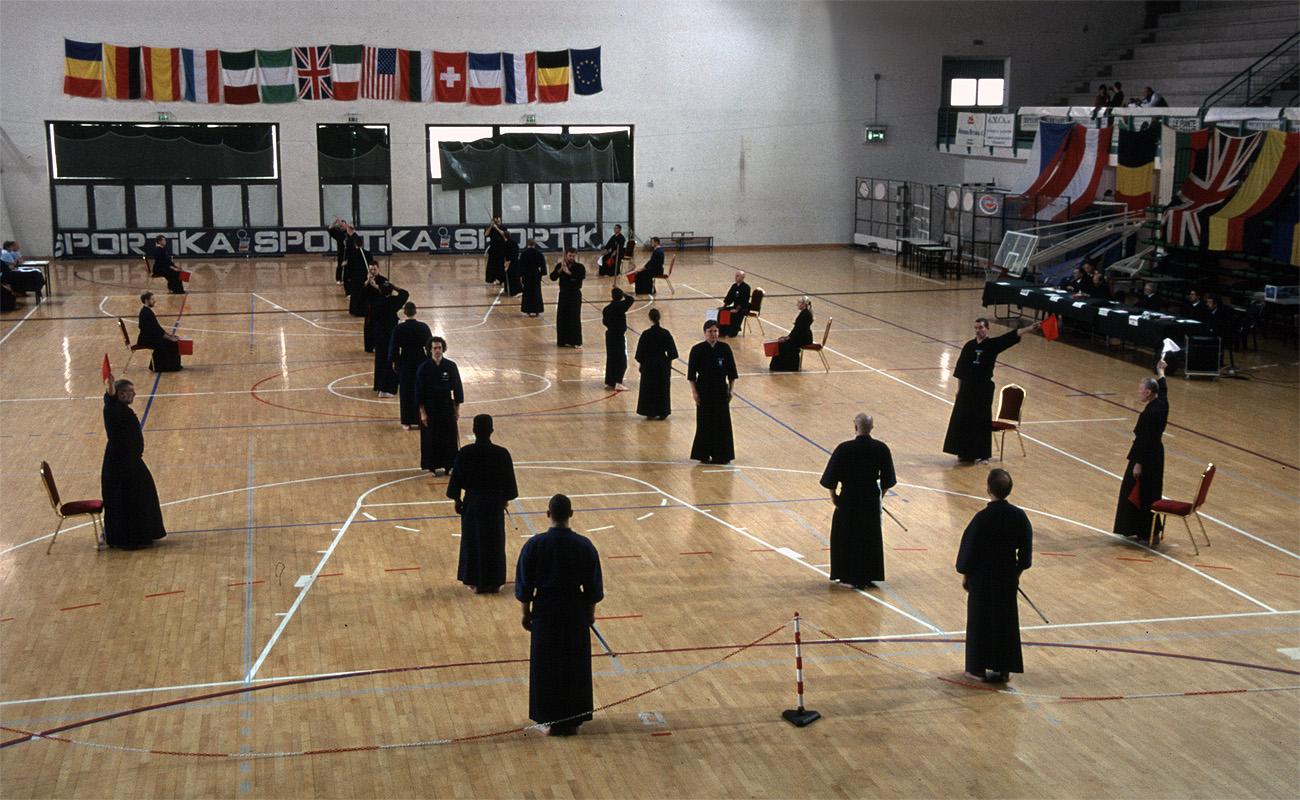
European Jōdō Championship, jodo shiai. Place Bologna Italia EJC-2005.

== Seitei Jodo ==
The art contains twelve forms (kata) and were developed in part by Shimizu Takaji and by a committee tasked with the creation of a compact Jōdō system to be taught mainly in Kendo dojos. The result was the Zen Ken Renmei Seitei Jōdō system containing twelve forms (kata)and twelve basic techniques (kihon). As such, Seitei is a simple form of jodo, compared to the Koryu styles, (kata), for example compared to Shintō Musō-ryū for instance, which has 64 techniques

Both the basic techniques and forms are drawn primarily from the koryu martial art Shinto Muso-ryu. The kata were chosen from the three first series of SMR, Omote, chudan and Ran ai as they were seen to best represent the art. Ten of these kata were taken from the existing SMR kata but with minor modifications as to better suit the requirements of the Kendo Federation. The two other kata was created specifically for the new Seitei Jōdō system and was not part of the original SMR-system. Seitei Jodo is today taught as a part of the Zen Nihon Kendo Renmei (All Japan Kendo Federation).

=== Kata and Kihon ===
Kihon	Kata
12 basic techniques practiced solo (Tandoku dosa) and in pairs (Sotai dosa)	12 slightly modified kata drawn from Shinto Muso-ryu Jōdō including 2 kata created specifically for Seitei Jodo
1. Honte Uchi; 2. Gyakute Uchi; 3. Hiki Otoshi Uchi; 4. Kaeshi Zuki; 5. Gyakute Zuki; 6. Maki Otoshi; 7. Kuri Tsuke; 8. Kuri Hanashi; 9. Tai Atari; 10. Tsuki Hazushi Uchi; 11. Dobarai Uchi; 12. Tai Hazushi Uchi (left and right side)	1. ipponme (Tsuki Zue); 2. nihonme (Suigetsu); 3. sanbonme (Hissage); 4. yonhonme (Shamen); 5. gohonme (Sakan); 6. ropponme (Monomi); 7. nanahonme (Kasumi); 8. hachihonme (Tachi Otoshi); 9. kyuhonme (Rai Uchi); 10. jupponme (Seigan); 11. jūipponme (Midare Dome); 12. jūnihonme (Ran Ai)

== Grades ==
Seitei Jōdō is essentially a gendai martial art with modern grades attached to the All Japan Kendo Federation. The dan/Kyū system is used for everyone. The koryu training licenses as found in SMR (Oku-iri, Shomokuroku, Gomokuroku and Menkyo Kaiden) are not used in Seitei Jōdō. The Seitei-system includes renshi, kyoshi, and hanshi ranks, although a Seitei Jodo practitioner can of course achieve the older ranks in SMR assuming they are trained in it specifically.

== Competitions ==
Unlike the original art, Seitei Jōdō holds competitions in which the performance of the uchidachi (sword) and shidachi (jo) is evaluated by a panel of judges giving points for proper execution of techniques.

== Training gear ==
=== Jō - The Staff ===
- The Jō is featured in several Japanese martial arts. For more information see the Jōdō article.

A Jō made of red oak, approx 128 cm long.

The All Japan Kendo Federation specifies that the Jō should be 128 cm (50 in) in length, with a diameter of 2.4 cm (0.94 in) and be made from red or white oak.

According to legend, Muso Gonnosuke, the founder of the original art of Shintō Musō-ryū, was inspired to create and use the Jo from a divine vision some time after he was defeated by Miyamoto Musashi in a duel. In this vision, a divine being in the form of a child appeared, brandishing a stick (or log in one version) and proclaiming "know the solar plexus [of your opponent] with a round stick". The jō, however, as a simple staff or walking-stick cannot be claimed to have a single inventor and would have existed long before Gonnosuke.

The jo, like its larger sibling the Bō (long staff), was never an effective weapon on the battlefield in comparison to the sword, spear and bow just to name a few. Although the jo and most other staves could be used to lethal effect when thrust at vital points of the body, when faced with a fully armoured opponent those vital points would in most cases be covered by armoured plating. As a result, there were very few ryu dedicated to the staff-arts in the warring era. There are several ryu that include jo-techniques in its system. One example is the jo-tradition found in the koryu art Tendo-ryu Naginatajutsu, founded in 1582. In Tendo-ryu, which uses the Naginata as the primary weapon, there are techniques with the jo that simulates a scenario where the naginata has been cut in two and the wielder has to defend himself with the staff-portion only.

With the onset of peace with the start of the Edo period (1603–1867), the conflicts with heavily armed and armoured warriors became a thing of the past. In this era, the jo-art would come into its own against non-armoured samurai and other opponents.

Various other martial arts also include elements of jōjutsu not necessarily related to Shinto Muso-ryu. One of the most famous promoter of the jo outside of Shinto Muso-ryu in modern times, and indeed in the martial arts community as a whole, was the founder of Aikido, Morihei Ueshiba. Ueshiba trained in a variety of ryu including Yagyu swordsmanship, but is not known to have trained in Shintō Musō-ryū. It is believed that Ueshiba used his training in sojutsu (spear) to create a set of techniques for the jo. (Ueshiba also used the longstaff bō to perform the same techniques.)

=== Tachi (Ken) - The sword ===
- The Ken is featured in several Japanese martial arts. For more information see the Kenjutsu article. A regular bokken (or bokuto), the wooden practice sword used in several martial arts including Shintō Musō-ryū.

The All Japan Kendo Federation specifies that the Tachi used in seitei Jodo should be 101.5 cm (40.0 in) in length, and made from white oak. The length of the tsuka, or hilt, should be 24.2 cm (9.5 in).

The Japanese sword, with its long history and many variations, has a prominent role in Shintō Musō-ryū. In the early Edo period the katana and the shorter wakizashi were the weapons of choice for samurai during their regular duties. On the battlefield, the slightly longer and more curved tachi would be used. In SMR the katana is the weapon used, but for training purposes a bokken (wooden sword) is used to minimize risk of injuries. Every training sequence (kata) starts with the swordsman, called Uchidachi, attacking the defender (shidachi), who in turn defeats his opponent.

Unlike the main Shintō Musō-ryū system, Seitei Jodo does not hold any kata that uses the kodachi (short sword) and it is not used during training. The kata hissage uses a kodachi in SMR but is substituted in SJ with the regular odachi (katana).

=== Clothing ===
In the majority of dojos today, the jodoka essentially uses the same clothing as practitioners of kendo, minus the armour and other protective padding: A blue/indigo uwagi (jacket), an obi (belt, often the same type as used in iaido), a blue or black hakama (wide trousers used by samurai). The type of clothing worn is not universal for all SMR dojos. In some dojos, which in addition to jodo may also have aikido practitioners, the white keikogi and regular white trousers are allowed. All-white keikogi and hakama are also used in various dojos and/or on special occasions such as public demonstrations or competitions

== See also ==
- Iaido
