= Hōzōin-ryū =

Traditional school of Japanese martial arts

Hōzōin-ryū (宝蔵院流)
- Ko-ryū
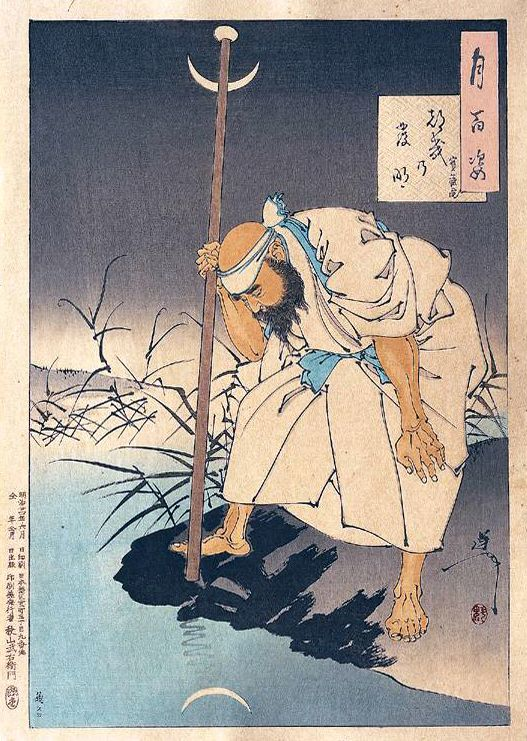
- In'ei watching the reflection of the moon. One Hundred Aspects of the Moon, by Yoshitoshi

Foundation
- Founder: Hōzōin Kakuzenbō In'ei (宝蔵院 覚禅房 胤栄, 1521–1607)
- Date founded: c.1560
- Period founded: Sengoku period (mid-15th century–mid-17th century)
- Location founded: Nara, Yamato Province

Current information
- Current headmaster: Komakita Manabu
- Current headquarters: Nara, Nara

Arts taught
- Art: Description
- Sōjutsu: Spear art

Descendant schools
- Daitō-ryū Aiki-jūjutsu • Shindō Yōshin-ryū

Hōzōin-ryū (宝蔵院流) is a traditional school (koryū) of Japanese martial arts that specializes in the art of spearmanship (sōjutsu). Hōzōin-ryū was founded by Hōzōin Kakuzenbō In'ei (宝蔵院 覚禅房 胤栄, 1521–1607) in c. 1560. In'ei was a Buddhist monk of Kōfuku-ji Temple in Nara, Japan. He adored martial arts and trained in the art of swordsmanship. At the same time, he was coached and mentored by Daizendayū Moritada (大膳太夫盛忠), a master of the spear. Under this master's guidance, In'ei honed his spearmanship.

It is said that one evening, on seeing the reflection of the crescent moon shining on Sarusawa pond in Kōfuku-ji, he was inspired to create a spear with a cross-shaped spearhead. He imagined this style of spear would be more effective in fighting. With this new type of spear (known as jumonji-yari (十文字槍)), he founded the Hōzōin-ryū.

Later, the teachings of the Hōzōin-ryū sōjutsu were passed down to other Buddhist monks of his order, with the next masters Hōzōin Inshun, Hōzōin Insei, Hōzōin Infū, Hōzōin Inken who constituted the monasterial line of the school ending on Inken, and Nakamura Naomasa and then Takada Matabei Yoshitsugu, who started the secular line of the school. The three best disciples of Takada went to Edo, present day Tokyo, to promote the art. Its reputation spread nationwide and the number of disciples increased. As martial art of Hōzōin-ryū sōjutsu was passed down from generation to generation, various new techniques as well as new dojo were created.

At the end of the Tokugawa shogunate, (around the middle of the 19th century) there were many masters of Hōzōin-ryū sōjutsu employed at the shogunate's martial arts training center. In the 19th century, the school was revived and updated thanks to Takeda Sokaku. He introduced the use of bamboo practice swords (shinai).

Eventually in 1976, Hōzōin-ryū sōjutsu returned to Nara. In 1991 Kagita Chubei (鍵田 忠兵衛) was appointed the 20th headmaster and has been leading the Hōzōin-ryū sōjutsu school until his death on 16 December 2011. His successor and 21st headmaster is Junzo Ichiya (一箭 順三).

An ancient Japanese poem expresses the spear of Hōzōin-ryū sōjutsu:

"It can be a spear to thrust. It can be a naginata to cleave. It can be a Kama to slash. In any case, it never fails to hit the target."

== Genealogy of the Hōzōin-ryū ==
The Hōzōinryū as practiced today follows the tradition of the secular line of the Hōzōinryū Takadaha, named after its founder Takada Matabee Yoshitsugu. As with many other Japanese schools, the headmasters keep the memory of tradition and line of their masters up to the beginning. As Hōzōin Kakuzenbō Inei was the founder of the Hōzōinryū and master of Takada and Nakamura, he is listed in the secular line as the first master too. Asterisks indicate uncertain readings.

The monasterial line:

- Hōzōin Kakuzenbō Inei (founder of the Hōzōinryū)
- Hōzōin Zeneibō Inshun (1589-1648)
- Hōzōin Kakushunbō Insei (1624-1689)
- Hōzōin Kakuzanbō Infū (1682-1731)
- Hōzōin Jōshikibō* Inken (1746-1808)

Masters of the secular line:

- Hōzōin Kakuzenbō Inei (founder of the Hōzōinryū)
- Nakamura Ichiemon Naomasa (founder of the Nakamuraha)
- Takada Matabee Yoshitsugu (founder of the Takadaha)
- Takada Matabee Yoshimichi
- Takada Yoshitoshi
- Takada Michiakira*
- Takada Yoshitaka
- Takada Matabee Yoshitora
- Takada Matabee Yoshichika
- Takada Magoichi Yoshitake
- A certain Endō
- Yamazato Tadahiro
- Sasaki Yasuzō
- Waku Kinzō
- Ishida Kazuto
- Nishikawa Gennai
- Kagita Chūbee
- Ichiya Junzō
- Komakita Manabu
