= One Hundred Aspects of the Moon =

Collection of Japanese art prints

One Hundred Aspects of the Moon, or Tsuki no Hyakushi (月百姿) in Japanese, is a collection of 100 ōban-size ukiyo-e woodblock prints by Japanese artist Tsukioka Yoshitoshi printed in batches, starting in 1885 until 1892. It represents one of Yoshitoshi's later works. The woodblock prints feature various famous figures, both historical and literary characters, each in a moonlit scene as well as occasional references to poetry.

== History ==
This series of 100 prints was published in 1885–92 by Akiyama Buemon. The subjects are drawn from various sources in Japanese and Chinese history and literature, Kabuki and Noh theatre, and even contemporary Edo (modern Tokyo), linked only by the presence of the Moon in each print. The creation of mood according to the phase of the Moon was exploited for its poetic and expressive possibilities. This was the most successful and still the most famous of Yoshitoshi's print series. People would queue before dawn to buy each new design and still find the edition sold out.

== List of prints ==
#	Image	Name	Description
Index page			
Title page			
1		By now you must be near Komakata, a cuckoo calls — Takao 君は今駒かたあたりほとゝきす たか雄; Kimi wa ima / Komakata atari / hototogisu — Takao	Takao was a name used by eleven courtesans in the Yoshiwara district of Edo. Here is the 6th Takao, known for her literary talents and dressed by the fashion of the late 17th century. The haiku in the cartouche describes her longing for her lover: "By now you must be near Komakata, a cuckoo calls".
2		The Gion District 祇園まち; Gionmachi	The district of Gion.
3		Chang'e flees to the Moon 嫦娥奔月; Joga hongetsu	The goddess of the Moon, Chang'e.
4		Rising moon over Mount Nanping 南屏山昇月; Nanpeizan shogetsu	Cao Cao viewing the Red Cliffs.
5		Under a full moon, the shadows of pine trees on the tatami — Kikaku 名月や畳の上に松の影 其角; Meigetsu ya / tatami no ue ni / matsu no kage — Kikaku	"Under a full moon, the shadows of pine trees on the tatami — Kikaku", haiku poetic verse by Takarai Kikaku.
6		The village of the Shi clan on a moonlit night — Nine-Dragon Tattoo 史家村月夜 九紋竜; Shikason tsukiyo — Kyumonryu	Shi Jin from the Water Margin, featuring his Nine-Dragon Tattoo.
7		Moon at Mount Inaba 稲葉山の月; Inabayama no tsuki	The Siege of Inabayama Castle.
8		Moonlight Patrol 月下の斥候 斎藤利三; Gekka no sekko — Saito Toshimitsu	Saitō Toshimitsu at the Battle of Yamazaki.
9		Moon of pure snow at Asano River — Chikako, the filial daughter 朝野川晴雪月 孝女ちか子; Asano-gawa seisetsu no tsuki — Kojo Chikako	Chikako was the daughter of Zeniya Gohei, who was wrongfully imprisoned.
10		Cooling off at Shijo 四条納涼; Shijo noryo	
11		Mountain moon after rain — Tokimune 雨後の山月 時致; Ugo no sangetsu — Tokimune	Soga Tokimune viewing a moonlit mountain after rainfall.
12		Mount Yoshino midnight moon — Iga no tsubone 吉野山夜半月 伊賀局; Yoshino-yama yowa no tsuki — Iga no tsubone	Scene of Iga no Tsubone, daughter-in-law of Kusunoki Masashige, confronting the ghost of the courtier Sasaki Kiyotaka on Mount Yoshino.
13		I listen to the sound of cloth being pounded / as the moon shines serenely / and believe that there is someone else / who has not yet gone to sleep — Tsunenobu から衣うつ音きけは月きよみ またかぬ人を空にしるかな 経信; Karakoromo / utsu koe kikeba / tsuki kiyomi / mada nenu hito o / sora ni shiru kana — Tsunenobu	The scene depicts a story where the courtier Minamoto no Tsunenobu was watching the autumn moon and composed the following verse based on Tang dynasty poetry: I listen to the sound of cloth being pounded / as the moon shines serenely / and believe that there is someone else / who has not yet gone to sleep Whereupon, a massive demon appeared and replied with a poetic verse from Li Bai: In the northern sky, geese fly across the Big Dipper; to the south, cold robes are pounded under the moonlight.
14		Moon above the Sea at Daimotsu Bay — Benkei 大物海上月 弁慶; Daimotsu kaijo no tsuki — Benkei	Benkei, warrior monk and servant of Minamoto no Yoshitsune, is attacked by the ghosts of the Taira clan in a violent storm at sea.
15		The cry of the fox 吼噦; Konkai	Hakuzōsu is the kitsune who pretended to be a Buddhist priest.
16		The moon glimmers like bright snow, and plum blossoms appear like reflected stars, ah! The golden mirror of the moon passes overhead, as fragrance from the jade chamber fills the garden — Sugawara no Michizane 月輝如晴雪 梅花以照星 可憐金鏡転 庭上玉房馨 菅原道真; Tsuki kagayakite seisetsu no gotoshi / baika wa shusei ni niru / awaremubeshi kinkyo tenzu / teijo gyokubo no kaori — Sugawara Michizune	Poetic verse by Sugawara no Michizane.
17		The moon of Ogurusu in Yamashiro 山城小栗栖月; Yamashiro Ogurusu no tsuki	The Moon at Ogurusu in Yamashiro, featuring Akechi Mitsuhide.
18		A cauldron on a moonlit night — Kobuna no Gengo and Shimaya Hanzo 月夜釜 小鮒の源吾 嶋矢伴蔵; Tsukiyo no kama — Kobuna no Gengo Shimaya Hanzo	
19		Suzaku Gate moon — Hakuga Sanmi 朱雀門の月 博雅三位; Suzakumon no tsuki — Hakuga Sanmi	Hakuga Sanmi (Minamoto no Hiromasa) playing the yokobue outside Suzaku Gate.
20		Faith in the crescent moon — Yukimori 信仰の三日月 幸盛; Shinko no mikazuki — Yukimori	Crescent-shaped decoration of Yamanaka Yukimori's kabuto (helmet).
21		Itsukushima moon — a Muro courtesan いつくしまの月 室遊; Itsukushima no tsuki — Muro no yujo	A scene from The Tale of the Heike in which Taira no Kiyomori meets a prostitute composing waka poems on a small boat during his pilgrimage to Itsukushima Shrine.
22		Moon and smoke 烟中月; Enchu no tsuki	Contemporary scene depicting a firefighter in Tokyo.
23		Chikubu Island moon — Tsunemasa 竹生島月 経正; Chikubu-shima no tsuki — Tsunemasa	Taira no Tsunemasa (平経正) at Chikubu Island.
24		The Yugao chapter from The Tale of Genji 源氏夕顔巻; Genji Yugao maki	The ghost of Yugao (named for the morning glory vine), a lover of Prince Genji in The Tale of Genji.
25		Cassia-tree moon — Wu Gang つきのかつら 呉剛; Tsuki no katsura — Gobetsu	Scene depicting the Chinese Taoist master Wu Gang with his axe. For abusing his power, he had been punished by the gods to forever chop the cassia trees on the Moon, only for them to immediately regenerate themselves.
26		Gravemarker moon 卒塔婆の月; Sotoba no tsuki	The famous poetess and lady of the court, Ono no Komachi, much later in her life—after her legendary beauty had faded—filled with regret for past choices.
27		Moon at the Yamaki Mansion 山木館の月 景廉; Yamaki yakata no tsuki — Kagekado	Kato Kagekado tries to kill Yamaki Kanetaka using his helmet as bait in the Battle of Ishibashiyama.
28		Moon of the pleasure quarters 廓の月; Kuruwa no tsuki	Moonlit nights in Yoshiwara.
29		The Moon through a crumbling window 破窓月; Haso no tsuki	The legendary Indian-Buddhist monk Bodhidharma was said to have journeyed to China to bring Zen teachings, and was reputed to have meditated in front of a wall for years until his arms and legs atrophied and fell off.
30		Mount Jiming moon — Zifang 鶏鳴山の月 子房; Keimeizan no tsuki — Shibo	Zifang (Zhang Liang) on Mount Jiming (modern-day Mount Zifang, Jiangsu) the night before a battle, playing songs from the enemy's homeland.
31		Kitayama moon — Toyohara no Muneaki 北山月 豊原統秋; Kitayama no tsuki — Toyohara no Muneaki	Toyohara no Muneaki (豊原統秋), a master instrumentalist, blows his shō to escape the wolves.
32		Dawn moon of the Shinto rites 神事残月; Shinji no zangetsu	Floats at the Sannō Matsuri.
33		The moon's inner vision — Te no Yubai 心観月 手友梅; Shinkan no tsuki — Te no Yubai	The blind Te no Yubai fights hard against the Mōri clan's army.
34		Mount Otowa moon — Sakanoue no Tamuramaro 音羽山月 田村明神; Otowayama no tsuki — Sakanoue no Tamuramaro	The spirit of Sakanoue no Tamuramaro appears at the Kiyomizu-dera.
35		Takakura moon — Hasebe Nobutsura 高倉月 長谷部信連; Takakura no tsuki — Hasebe Nobutsura	Hasebe Nobutsura watches as Prince Mochihito, disguised as a woman, leaves to escape his Taira clan pursuers.
36		The Moon of the Milky Way 銀河月; Ginga no tsuki	Scene depicting the star-crossed lovers of the Qixi Festival in China, and the Tanabata festival in Japan.
37		A glimpse of the Moon — Kahoyo 垣間見の月 かほよ; Kaimami no tsuki — Kahoyo	Kahoyo Gozen, wife of Enya Takasada (塩冶高貞), in a scene from Kanadehon Chūshingura.
38		How hopeless it is / it would be better for me to sink beneath the waves / perhaps then I could see my man from Moon Capital — Ariko はかなしや波の下にも入ぬへし つきの都の人や見るとて 有子; Hakanashiya / nami no shita nimo / irinubeshi / tsuki no miyako no / hito ya miru tote — Ariko	A scene from Genpei Jōsuiki depicts Ariko, a shrine maiden at Itsukushima Shrine, who falls in love with Tokudaiji Sanesada and despairs of their unfulfilled love because of their different status.
39		Theater-district dawn moon しはゐまちの暁月; Shibaimachi no akatsuki	
40		On the coast at Kiyomi even the sky bars the way / the moon is blocked by the Miho pine groves きよみかた空にも関のあるならば 月をとゝめて三保の松原; Kiyomi gata / sora nimo seki no / arunaraba / tsuki o todomete / Miho no matsubara	Takeda Shingen during his invasion of Suruga Province.
41		In the midst of glimmering whiteness / among the night's moon-shadows / I part the snow and pluck plum blossoms - Kinto しらしらとしらけたる夜の月かけに 雪かきわけて梅の花折る 公任; Shirajira to / shiraketaru yo no / tsukikage ni / yuki kakiwakete / ume no hana oru — Kinto	Fujiwara no Kinto, considered one of the preeminent poets and calligraphers of the Heian period, who helped compile official poetry anthologies in his capacity as advisor to the Emperor, picks a plum blossom.
42		I wish I had gone to bed immediately / but now the night has passed / and I watch the moon descend やすらはて寝なましものを小夜ふけて かたふく迄の月を見しかな yasurawade / nenamashi mono o / sayo fukete / katabuku made no / tsuki o mishi kana	Akazome Emon was an accomplished poet during the late Heian period of history; this scene depicts a verse from one of her poems where she waited overnight for her lover in vain: I wish I had gone to bed immediately; but now the night has passed and I watch the moon descend.
43		Inamura Promontory moon at daybreak 垣間見の月 かほよ; Inamuragasaki no akebono no tsuki	Nitta Yoshisada offering a tachi to the kami of the sea and praying for success in breaking through Inamuragasaki and invading Kamakura.
44		Hazy-night moon — Kumasaka 垣間見の月 かほよ; Oboroyo no tsuki — Kumasaka	A scene from the Noh play Oborozukiyo shows the legendary bandit Kumasaka Chōhan (熊坂長範).
45		Bon Festival moon 盆の月; Bon no tsuki	
46		Moon of the enemy's lair — Prince Ousu 賊巣の月 小碓皇子; Zokuso no tsuki — Ousu no miko	Prince Ousu (Yamato Takeru) disguised himself as a girl to assassinate the brothers of the Kumaso leader.
47		Huai River moon — Wu Zixu 淮水月 伍子胥; Waisui no tsuki — Goshisho	Chinese general Wu Zixu's escape from Chu on the Huai river.
48		Like reflections in the rice-paddies / the faces of streetwalkers in the darkness / are exposed by the autumn moonlight — Hitotose 田毎ある中にもつらき辻君の かほさらしなや運の月かけ 一とせ; Tagoto aru / naka nimo tsuraki / tsujigimi no / kao Sarashina ya / aki no tsukikage — Hitotose	
49		The Moon and the helm of a boat — Taira no Kiyotsune 舵楼の月 平清経; Daro no tsuki — Taira no Kiyotsune	Taira no Kiyotsune (平清経) plays his flute on the ship before the battle, ready to die.
50		Lady Gosechi 五節の命婦; Gosechi no myobu	A scene from Jikkinshō (十訓抄) depicts Minamoto no Tsunenobu and others who are moved to tears by the sound of a koto played by a former court lady who has abandoned the world to live in seclusion in a dilapidated house.
51		Mount Tobisu dawn moon — Toda Hanbei Shigeyuki 鳶巣山暁月 戸田半平重之; Tobisuyama gyogetsu — Toda Hanbei Shigeyuki	A scene from Jōzan Kidan (常山紀談), showing Toda Hanbei Shigeyuki at the Battle of Nagashino.
52		Sumiyoshi full moon — Lord Teika 住よしの名月 定家卿; Sumiyoshi no meigetsu — Teikako	This scene depicts the famous poet and compiler of the Ogura Hyakunin Isshu, Fujiwara no Teika, falling asleep on the veranda of the Sumiyoshi Shrine. The shrine was devoted to the patron deity of poets, and according to tradition, while Teika slept, he dreamt of a deity visiting him in the form of a ghostly old man.
53		The night is full and a hundred flowers are fragrant in the western palace / she orders the screen to be rolled up, regretting the passing of spring / with the yunhe across her lap she gazes at the moon / the colours of the trees are hazy in the indistinct moonlight — Wang Changling 西宮夜静百花香 欲捲珠簾春恨長 斜抱雲和深見月 朧々樹色隠照陽 王昌齢; Seikyu yoru shizukanishite hyakka kaoru / gyokuren o makan to hosshite haru no takaru o uramu / naname ni unwa o idakite fukaku tsuki o miru / roro to shite jushoku shoyo o kakusu — Oshorei	Poetic verse by Wang Changling.
54		The full moon / coming with a challenge / to flaunt its beautiful brow — Fukami Jikyu 名月や来てみよかしのひたい際 深見自休; Meigetsu ya / kite miyo gashi no / hitai giwa — Fukami Jikyu	Fukami Jikyu (Fukami Juzaburo), a ronin.
55		Usually I dislike a cloudy sky / tonight I realise that a cloudy sky / makes me appreciate the light of the moon — Gen'i 常にこそ曇もいとへと今宵そと おもふは月の光なりけり 玄以; Tsune ni koso / kumori mo itoe / koyoi koso / omou wa tsuki no — Gen'i	Maeda Gen'i.
56		Reading by the moon — Zilu 読書の月 子路; Dokusho no tsuki — Shiro	Zilu (Zhong You), a disciple of Confucius and one of the Twenty-four Filial Exemplars.
57		Does the cuckoo also / announce its name from above the clouds? / Yorimasa extemporises: / I only bent my bow / and the arrow shot itself ほとゝきすなをも雲ゐに上るかな 頼政とりあへす 弓張月のいるにまかせて; Hototogisu / nao mo kumoi ni / aguru kana / Yorimasa toriaezu / yumiharizuki no / iru ni makasete	A scene from The Tale of the Heike, describing how after the master archer Minamoto no Yorimasa killed the yōkai Nue, silence returned and the cuckoo's call could be heard.
58		In the moonlight under the trees, a beautiful woman comes 月明林下美人来; Getsumei rinka bijin majiru	
59		Received back into Moon Palace — The Bamboo Cutter 月宮迎 竹とり; Gekkyu no mukae — Taketori	This print depicts the last scene from the famous tale of the Bamboo Cutter's Daughter, as Kaguya-hime (かぐや姫) is escorted back to her home on the Moon, reluctantly leaving her adoptive parent behind.
60		Gojo Bridge moon 五條橋の月; Gojobashi no tsuki	Minamoto no Yoshitsune fighting Benkei at Gojo Bridge.
61		Moon of Enlightenment 悟道の月; Godo no tsuki	This scene depicts one of the Seven Luck Gods, Hotei, pointing at the Moon, in reference to the Zen aphorism that pointing at the Moon is not the Moon itself.
62		The moon of the moor — Yasumasa 原野月 保昌; Harano no tsuki — Yasumasa	A scene from Konjaku Monogatari in which the bandit Hakamadare tries to attack Fujiwara no Yasumasa (藤原保昌), who is playing the flute, but is unable to do so because of the intimidating atmosphere Fujiwara exudes.
63		As I look into the vast expanse / can this be the same moon / that I saw rise in Kasuga behind Mount Mikasa? あまの原ふりさけみれば春日なる 三笠の山に出し月かも; Ama no hara / furisake mireba / Kasuga naru / Mikasa no yama ni / ideshi tsuki kamo	Abe no Nakamaro was a member of an official delegation to China from Japan, and stayed for years before returning home. Viewing the Moon here is a possible allusion to poem number 7 of the hyakunin isshu anthology.
64		Katada Bay moon — Saito Kuranosuke 堅田浦の月 斎藤内蔵介; Katadaura no tsuki — Saito Kuranosuke	Saitō Kuranosuke (Saitō Toshimitsu), who fled after being defeated at the Battle of Yamazaki.
65		Moon of the Southern Sea 南海月; Nankai no tsuki	Southern Sea Avalokiteśvara, a form of Guanyin.
66		Seson temple moon — Captain Yoshitaka 世尊寺の月 少将義孝; Sesonji no tsuki — Shosho Yoshitaka	Heian period courtier Fujiwara no Yoshitaka seated outside Seson temple (世尊寺家).
67		Shizu Peak moon — Hideyoshi 志津か嶽月 秀吉; Shizugatake no tsuki — Hideyoshi	Toyotomi Hideyoshi at the Battle of Shizugatake.
68		Joganden moon — Minamoto no Tsunemoto 貞観殿月 源経基; Joganden no tsuki — Minamoto no Tsunemoto	Minamoto no Tsunemoto kills a sika deer that sneaks into the court with his yumi.
69		Lunacy - unrolling letters 月のものくるひ 文ひろけ; Tsuki no monogurui — fumihiroge	The scene depicts a distraught Ochiyo, lover of Toyotomi Hideyoshi, after learning that he has died. It is said that after receiving the news, she went mad rolling and unrolling his letters until she died.
70		Moon of the filial son — Ono no Takamura 孝子の月 小野篁; Koshi no tsuki — Ono no Takamura	
71		Moon of the Red Cliffs 赤壁月; Sekiheki no tsuki	Su Shi writing poems on a boating trip to the Red Cliffs (东坡赤壁) on the Yangtze River.
72		Shinobugaoka moon — Gyokuensai 忍岡月 玉渕斎; Shinobugaoka no tsuki — Gyokuensai	A scene from a senryū poem by Mizutani Ryokutei (水谷緑亭). When a man named Gyokuensai went to Ueno to see the cherry blossoms, he brushed the petals from the sleeves of his kimono and was mocked by the drunken guests who said, "You wouldn't mind the flowers falling on your kimono if it were so shabby. The man replied with an extemporaneous and brilliant tanka poem.
73		Rainy moon — Kojima Takanori 雨中月 児嶋高徳; Uchu no tsuki — Kojima Takanori	Kojima Takanori (児島高徳) praying under a cherry tree.
74		Mount Ashigara moon — Yoshimitsu 足柄山月 義光; Ashigarayama no tsuki — Yoshimitsu	Minamoto no Yoshimitsu teaches the son of his deceased shō teacher a song on Mount Ashigara.
75		Mount Miyaji moon — Moronaga 宮路山の月 師長; Miyajiyama no tsuki — Moronaga	Fujiwara no Moronaga playing the biwa on Mount Miyaji (宮路山).
76		Ishiyama moon 石山月; Ishiyama no tsuki	
77		Jade Rabbit — Sun Wukong 玉兎 孫悟空; Gyokuto — Songoku	Sun Wukong fights the Moon Rabbit.
78		The bottom of the bucket / which Lady Chiyo filled, has fallen out / the moon has no home in the water 千代能かいたゝく桶の底抜けて みつたまらねは月もやとらす; Chiyodono ga / itadaku oke no / soko nukete / misu tamari tewa / tsuki mo yadorazu	This scene depicts a haiku by the famous poetess, Kaga no Chiyo: The bottom of the bucket, which Lady Chiyo filled has fallen out; the moon has no home in the water.
79		Did I ever imagine that / as the clouds of the high autumn sky cleared / I would view the moon through a bamboo lattice window — Hidetsugu おもひきや雲ゐの秋のそらならて 竹あむ窓の月を見んとは 秀次; Omoikiya / kumoi no aki no / sora harete / take amu mado no / tsuki o min to wa — Hidetsugu	Toyotomi Hidetsugu, imprisoned by Toyotomi Hideyoshi in Mount Kōya.
80		Frost fills the camp and the autumn air is still / lines of returning geese cross the moon of the third hour — Kenshin 霜満軍営秋気清 数行過雁月三更 謙信; Shimo gunei ni michi shūki kiyoshi / sugyo no hengan tsuki sanko — Kenshin	Uesugi Kenshin was a major warlord during the Warring States period.
81		As I am about to enter the ranks of those who disobey / ever more brightly shines / the moon of the summer night — Akashi Gidayu 弓取の数に入るさの身となれは おしまさりけり夏夜月 明石儀太夫; Yumitori no / kazu ni irusa no / mi to nareba / terimasarikeri / natsu no yo tsuki — Akashi Gidayu	Akashi Gidayu, a retainer to Akechi Mitsuhide writing his death poem before committing seppuku.
82		Cloth-beating moon — Yugiri きぬたの月 夕霧; Kinuta no tsuki — Yugiri	A scene from the Noh play Kinuta. It depicts the sadness of a wife who protects her husband's house while he is away.
83		Moon of the Lonely House 孤家月; Hitotsuya no tsuki	Legend of onibaba who lives in Asajigahara (浅茅ヶ原の鬼婆).
84		How noisy, the sound of insects calling in the meadow / as for me, I make no sound but think of love かしかまし野もせにすたく虫の音よ 我たになかくものをこそおもへ; Kashigamashi / nomose ni sudaku / mushi no ne yo / waredani nakade / mono o koso omoe	
85		Moon of Kintoki's mountain 金時山の月; Kintokiyama no tsuki	Kintoki (Kintarō) refereeing a match between a monkey and a rabbit.
86		Pleasure is this / to lie cool under the moonflower bower / the man in his undershirt, the woman in her slip たのしみは夕顔たなのゆふ涼 男はてゝら女はふたのして; Tanoshimi wa / yugaodana no / yusuzumi / otoko wa tetera / me wa futa no shie	A man and a woman cool off for the evening (夕涼み, yūsuzumi) under a trellis of calabash (夕顔, yūgao).
87		Horin temple moon — Yokobue 法輪寺の月 横笛; Horinji no tsuki — Yokobue	Yokobue, an attendant of the empress Kenreimonin, weeping at Horin temple. In the Tale of the Heike, her lover Tokiyori became a monk at the temple, unable to marry her.
88		Kazan temple moon 花山寺の月; Kazanji no tsuki	Emperor Kazan goes to the temple to be ordained.
89		Dawn moon and tumbling snow — Kobayashi Heihachiro 雪後の暁月 小林平八郎; Seppu no gyogetsu — Kobayashi Heihachiro	Kobayashi Heihachiro (小林平八郎) fought as a samurai on Kira Yoshinaka's side against 47 ronin in the famous "Forty-seven rōnin" Akō incident.
90		Chofu village moon 調布里の月; Chofu sato no tsuki	
91		The moon's invention — Hozoin つきの発明 宝蔵院; Tsuki no hatsumei — Hozoin	The scene depicts how Hōzōin In'ei, the founder of the Hōzōin-ryū, was inspired by the crescent moon reflected on the surface of the water and invented the crescent moon-shaped yari (Japanese spear).
92		The moon's four strings — Semimaru 月の四の緒 蝉丸; Tsuki no yotsu no o — Semimaru	This scene depicts the famous poet and musician, Semimaru, tuning the strings of his lute at a mountain cottage.
93		Since the crescent moon I have been waiting for tonight — Old man 三日月の頃より待し今宵哉 翁 Mikazuki no koroyori machishi koyoi kana — Okina	The haiku poet Matsuo Bashō is said to have come upon two farmers celebrating the full moon, whereupon he composed the following verse:
94		Cherry trees blossom by the Sumida river / boats fade from view in the gathering dusk / at Sekiya as I view the moon — Mizuki Tatsunoke 桜さくすみたの川にこくふねも くれて関屋に月をこそ見れ 水木辰の助; Sakura saku / Sumida no kawa ni / uku fune mo / kurete Sekiya ni / tsuki o koso mire — Mizuki Tatsunosuke	Mizuki Tatsunosuke, popular Kabuki actor of the Genroku era.
95		Saga Moor moon 嵯峨野の月; Sagano no tsuki	Kogō no Tsubone, daughter of Emperor Takakura, was an accomplished koto player. After surviving an assassination attempt, she fled to Saga. The emperor dispatched Minamoto no Nakakuni to find her, who recognized her by her exquisite koto playing. In this scene, he joins her with his flute and convinces her to return to the capital.
96		The moon and the abandoned old woman 姥捨月; Obasute no tsuki	
97		A Buddhist monk receives cassia seeds on a moonlit night 梵僧月夜受桂子; Bonso tsukiyo ni keishi o uku	One of the Buddhist arhats, the Buddha's original disciples, is shown collecting magic seeds from the cassia trees on the Moon, thereby attaining immortality.
98		Musashi Plain moon むさしのゝ月; Musashino no tsuki	
99		Monkey-music moon 猿楽月; Sarugaku no tsuki	A scene depicting the morning of the Tokugawa Shogun's celebration from the building side of Edo Castle. Only on this day was the chōnin class allowed to enter the South Garden of Edo Castle to watch the Noh play.
100		The moon at high tide いてしほの月; Ideshio no tsuki	A scene from the Noh play Takasago.
