= Shintō Musō-ryū Jo Kata =

Kata (型 or 形 literally: "form"?) is an old way of teaching traditional martial arts in Japan. Kata are used in many modern and koryū martial arts as a way of teaching advanced techniques and maneuvers using a series of scripted movements and actions against an opponent. In many of the older koryū martial arts, kata are at the center of what is taught with little or even no sparring as compared to more modern martial arts such as kendo and/or judo

The modern Shintō Musō-ryū system holds approximately 64 jō kata divided into several series. All forms are normally taught in sequence. In some SMR dojos, new students begin their kata training by learning one or more kata from the Seitei Jodo-curriculum due to their relative technical simplicity.

As a comparison, the compact Seitei Jodo created by Shimizu Takaji contains 12 forms. Ten of these kata are drawn from the existing SMR kata with minor modifications, and 2 other kata created specifically for Seitei Jodo. The two specific Seitei jodo are taught in various SMR dojos outside the main series of Kata.

As Shinto Musō-ryū has no current single leader, there exists no strict consensus regarding which order the kata should be taught, though the traditional order when applied is Omote, chudan, ran ai, kage, samidare Gohon (not in every dojo), okuden and hiden gokui. The kata-series Gohon no midare was created by Shimizu Takaji in the late 1930s and is not taught by every Dojo. The number of kata in each series is also not strictly defined by any single organisation. The Chudan series counts twelve kata plus one variant thus pushing the actual number of kata performed to thirteen.

The list of kata series below is mainly from the Shimizu Takaji-line of Shinto Musō-ryū Jodo.

== Omote ==
Omote (表) is the first earliest^{1} series of kata taught to new students. The two Seitei Jodo kata are taught in some dojos before Tachi Otoshi, although not always. Tzuki Zue is also sometimes used as a first kata taught to new students.

(1) Tsuki Zue (In some dojos)
(2) Suigetsu (In some dojos)
(3) Shamen (In some dojos)

1. Tachi Otoshi (太刀落)
2. Tsuba wari (鍔割)
3. Tsuki Zue (著杖)
4. Hissage (引下) – Short sword
5. Sakan (左貫)
6. Ukan (右貫)
7. Kasumi (霞)
8. Monomi (物見)
9. Kasa no shita (笠の下)
10. Ichi rei (一礼)
11. Neya no uchi (寝屋内)
12. Hoso michi (細道)

== Chudan ==
Chudan (中段) is the second earliest^{1} series of Jo-kata.

1. Ichi riki (一力)
2. Oshi zume (押詰)
3. Midare dome (乱留)
4. Ushiro zue (zen)/(go) (後杖) – Two variants
5. Taisha (待車)
6. Kengome (間込) – Two-sword kata
7. Kiri kake (切縣)
8. Shin shin (真進)
9. Rai uchi (雷打)
10. Yokogiri dome (横切留)
11. Harai dome (払留)
12. Seigan (清眼)

== Ran ai ==
Ran ai (乱合) a new series of Jo-kata, created in the bakumatsu period (1850–1867). It is taught as the third series in most SMR-dojos today. The series was developed in one of the three lines of SMR of the time. The series contain two kata, both nearly identical in movements but performed with the long and short sword respectively.

1. Ran ai odachi (大太刀) – longsword
2. Ran ai kodachi (小太刀) – shortsword

== Kage ==
Kage (影) is the third earliest^{1} series of jo-kata (though taught as the fourth series in most SMR-dojos today). Holds the same names as the omote series. The variants are variously called zen/go or omote/ura

1. Tachi otoshi (太刀落)
2. Tsuba wari (鍔割)
3. Tsuki zue (著杖)
4. Hissage (引下)
5. Sakan (左貫)
6. Ukan (右貫)
7. Kasumi (霞)
8. Monomi (物見)
9. Kasa no shita (笠の下)
10. Ichi rei (zen)/(go) (一礼) – Two variants
11. Neya no uchi (zen)/(go) (寝屋内) – Two variants
12. Hoso michi (細道)

== Samidare / Satsuki Ame ==
Samidare (五月雨)The fourth earliest^{1} series of jo-kata. The number of kata in this series are sometimes counted as having five kata plus one variant.

1. Ichi monji (一文字)
2. Ju monji (十文字)
3. Kodachi otoshi (小太刀落)
4. Mijin (omote) (微塵)
5. Mijin (ura) (微塵)
6. Gan tsubushi (眼潰)

== Gohon no midare ==
Gohon no midare (五本の乱) is a new series of jo-kata created and added to the SMR-system by Shimizu Takaji around 1939. The series is taught as number six in the total of eight kata-series in most SMR-dojos today. Gohon is not part of the traditional system though it is being taught by most SMR-groups.

1. Tachi otoshi no midare (太刀落の乱)
2. Sakan no midare (左貫の乱)
3. Kengome no midare (間込の乱)
4. Kasumi no midare (霞の乱)
5. Shamen no midare (斜面の乱)

== Okuden / Shiaikuchi ==
Okuden/Shiaikuchi (奥) Fifth earliest^{1} series of Jo-kata, taught as series number seven in most SMR-dojos today. This list is shown in the order taught by Shimizu Takaji and many of his students today, though not necessarily by all SMR-groups. This series is the last one taught openly to an advanced student and only dedicated and mature students are allowed to study it.

1. Sengachi (先勝)
2. Tsuki dashi (突出)
3. Uchi tsuke (打附)
4. Kote dome (小手留)
5. Hiki tsute (引捨)
6. Kote garami (小手搦)
7. Jutte (十手)
8. Mikaeri (身替)
9. Aun (阿吽)
10. Uchiwake (打分)
11. Suigetsu (水月)
12. Sayu dome (左右留)

== Hiden Gokui ==
The sixth traditional (eighth in the system taught by Shimizu Takaji and many of his students & descendants today) and last earliest known^{1} series of jo-kata, or secret forms, of the SMR system. After the first kata is taught the student receives a Menkyo scroll. When all five kata have been taught the student is issued a full License of Total Transmission Menkyo Kaiden.

1. Yamiuchi (闇打)
2. Yumemakura (夢枕)
3. Murakumo (村雲)
4. Inazuma (稲妻)
5. Dobo (導母)

== See also ==
- Bujutsu/Budō – The "Way of War" or the "Way of the warrior".
- Daimyō – The aristocratic samurai landowners of feudal Japan. Samurai themselves, they employed other lesser samurai as warriors and keepers of orders to expand and police the Daimyō's domains. This arrangement lasted until the Meiji restoration in the late 1860s and the later abolition of the feudal system.
- Iaidō/Iaijutsu – Martial Art – The art of drawing the Japanese sword.
- Ko-ryū – Japanese martial arts created before the 1868 Meiji restoration. Any art created that was created post-1868, such as Judo, Karate, Aikido, Taidō, are considered to be Gendai budō. Karate, although preceding 1868, does not qualify as koryū due to the fact it did not evolve in Japan but on the Ryukyu Islands (modern Okinawa Prefecture) which did not become a part of Japan until the 17th century.
- Samurai – The warrior elite of feudal Japan. The Samurai caste was abolished in the Meiji restoration's aftermath.
- Seitei Jōdō – Modern, compact version of SMR with 12 kata taught in the Zen Nihon Kendo Renmei.

== Footnotes ==
- ^1 "Early" in this case refers to the Jo-kata that are present in the Shinto Musō-ryū Densho, (earliest scrolls of transmission with list of kata and lineage). Over time other SMR-jo practitioners have added newer series of Jo-kata such as Gohon-no-midare and Ran ai to the curriculum without adding it to the written densho.
