= Jōdō =

Japanese martial art

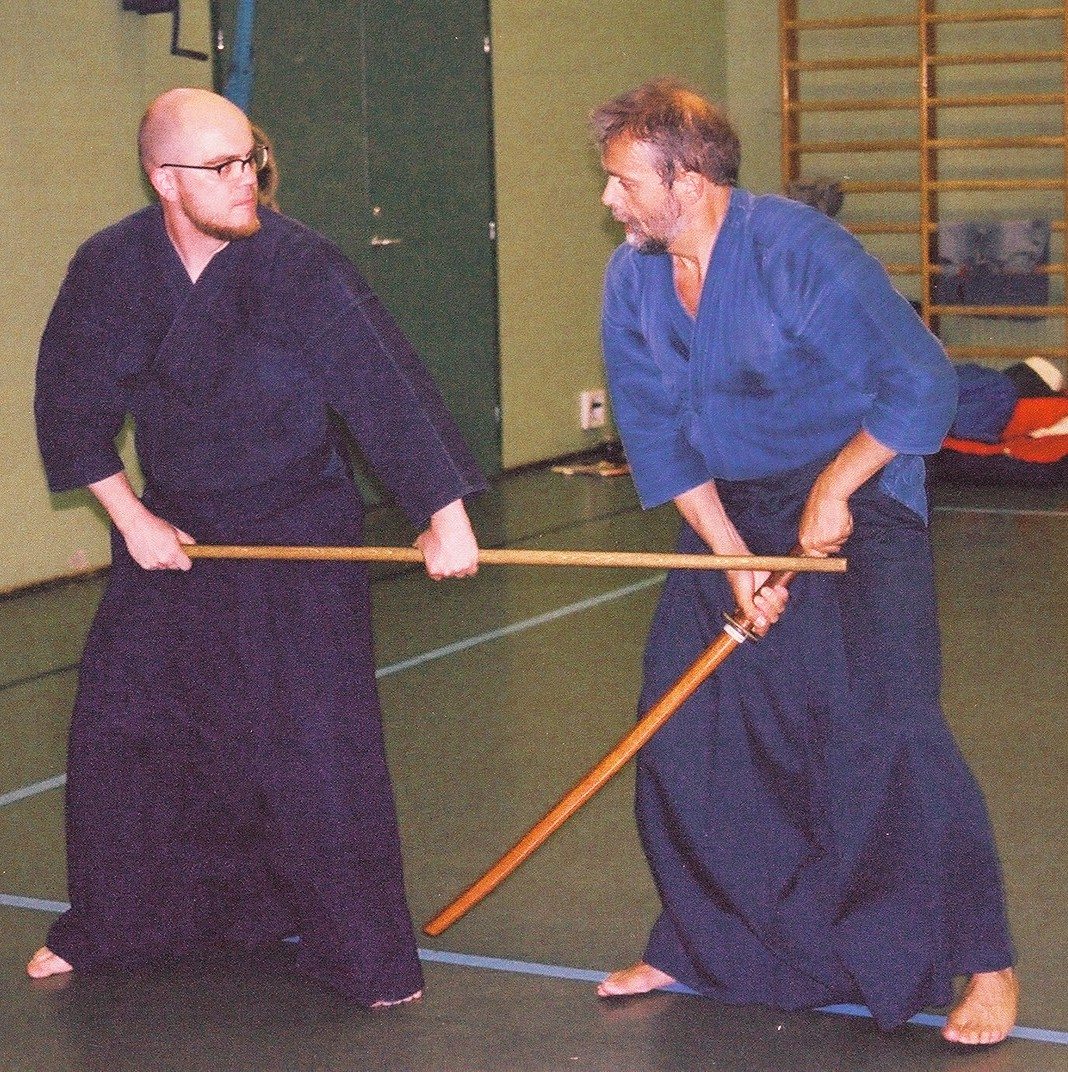
- Also known as: Way of the staff Art of the staff
- Focus: Weaponry
- Country of origin: Japan
- Creator: Musō Gonnosuke
- Olympic sport: no

Jōdō (杖道), meaning "way of the jō", or jōjutsu (杖術), meaning "art of the jō", is a Japanese martial art using a short staff called jō. The art is similar to bōjutsu, and is strongly focused upon defense against the Japanese sword. The jō is a short staff, usually about 3 to 5 feet (0.9 to 1.5 m) long.

== Legendary origins of Jōjutsu ==
Shintō Musō-ryū jōjutsu (sometimes known as Shintō Musō-ryū jōdō - "Shindō" is also a valid pronunciation for the leading characters) is reputed to have been invented by the great swordsman Musō Gonnosuke Katsuyoshi (夢想 權之助 勝吉, fl. c.1605, date of death unknown) about 400 years ago, after a bout won by the famous Miyamoto Musashi (宮本 武蔵, 1584–1645). According to this tradition, Gonnosuke challenged Musashi using a bō, or long staff, a weapon he was said to wield with great skill. Although other accounts of this first duel disagree, according to the oral tradition of Shintō Musō-ryū, Musashi caught Gonnosuke's bō in a two-sword "X" block (jūji-dome; 十字止め). Once in this position, Gonnosuke could not move in such a way as to prevent Musashi from delivering a counterattack, and Musashi elected to spare his life.

Gonnosuke's wanderings then brought him to Mount Hōman in Chikuzen (modern-day Fukuoka) where, after a period of purification, meditation, and training, Gonnosuke claimed to have received a divine vision from a small child who told him: "holding a round stick, know the solar plexus" ("maruki wo motte, suigetsu wo shire"「丸木を以って、水月を知れ」). By shortening the length of the bō from roughly 185 to 128 cm (73 to 50 in) (or, in Japanese measurement units, four shaku, two sun and one bu), he could increase the versatility of the weapon, giving him the ability to use techniques created for the long staff, spear fighting and swordsmanship. The length of the new weapon was longer than the tachi (long sword) of the period, but short enough to allow the reversal of the striking end of the jō in much tighter quarters than the longer bō. Gonnosuke could alter the techniques he used with the jō stick, depending on the opponent he faced, to provide himself with many different options of attack. He named his style Shintō Musō-ryū and challenged Musashi again. This time, when Musashi attempted to use the jūji-dome block on the jō staff, Gonnosuke was able to wheel around the other end of the staff (because of the reduced length), forcing Musashi into a position where he had to concede defeat. Returning the courtesy he received during their previous duel, Gonnosuke spared Musashi's life.

This may be an embellished story of the creation of jōjutsu, as the oral tradition of Shintō Musō-ryū is the only mention of this second duel, or for that matter, a person defeating Musashi in combat. Witness accounts of Musashi's life, as well as his own writings, insist he retired from dueling undefeated. Furthermore, while this legend is the most well-known tale to include the use of the jō, Gonnosuke cannot be credited as the sole creator of the jō as a number of other schools from the same period and with no links to Shintō Musō-ryū also include jōjutsu in their curriculum (Suiō-ryū, Tendō-ryū, Hōten-ryū, Takenouchi-ryū). What is known about Gonnosuke after his alleged second duel is that he eventually became the martial arts instructor for the Kuroda clan of northern Kyūshū, where jōjutsu remained an exclusive art of the clan until the early 1900s, when the art form was taught to the general public.

== Modern practice ==
The modern study of jōdō has two branches.

One is koryū, or "old school" jōdō. This branch is further subdivided into a number of different schools which include jōdō or jōjutsu in their curriculum (Shintō Musō-ryū, Suiō-ryū, Tendō-ryū, Hōten-ryū, Kukishin-ryū, Takenouchi-ryū, etc.). These schools also teach the use of other weapons such as the sword, the naginata, the short staff (tanjō), the chained sickle (kusarigama), the truncheon (jutte), and jūjutsu (close combat for defeating an opponent in which one uses either a short weapon or none). Most practitioners specialise in only one school.

The other branch is called Seitei Jōdō and is practiced by the All Japan Kendō Federation (全日本剣道連盟 Zen Nippon Kendō Renmei). Seitei is a simpler form of jōdō, compared to the Koryū styles, with only 12 pre-arranged forms (kata), compared to Shintō Musō-ryū for instance, which has 64 In addition to these 12 kata the student will also study their koryū.

Jōjutsu has also been adapted for use in the Japanese police force, who refer to the art as keijō-jutsu (警杖術), or police stick art.

Aiki-jō is the name given to the set of martial art techniques practiced with a jō according to the principles of aikido, taught first by Morihei Ueshiba then further developed by Morihiro Saito, one of Ueshiba's most prominent students.

== List of martial arts that include Jodo/Jojutsu ==
- Aikidō
- Yoshida ha Shidare Yanagi ryū
- Hapkido includes similar short staff and cane techniques.
- Hōten-ryū - jōjutsu
- Kukishin-ryu
- Niten Ichi-ryū
- Shintō Musō-ryū
- Suiō-ryū - Koryū whose curriculum includes jōjutsu
- Takenouchi-ryū
- Takeda Ryū Nakamura Ha
- Tendō-ryū bujutsu
- Tendō-ryu Aikidō
- Toda-ha Bukō-ryū
- Yanagi-ryū Tuite
- Muhi Muteki ryū jōjutsu

== See also ==
- Banshay
- Bataireacht
- Jogo do pau
- Kalarippayattu stick-fighting
- Kendo
- Krabi–krabong
- Pugil stick
- Silambam
- Silambam Asia
- Stick fighting
- Tahtib
- World Silambam Association
