= Yari =

Japanese straight-headed spear

Yari (槍)
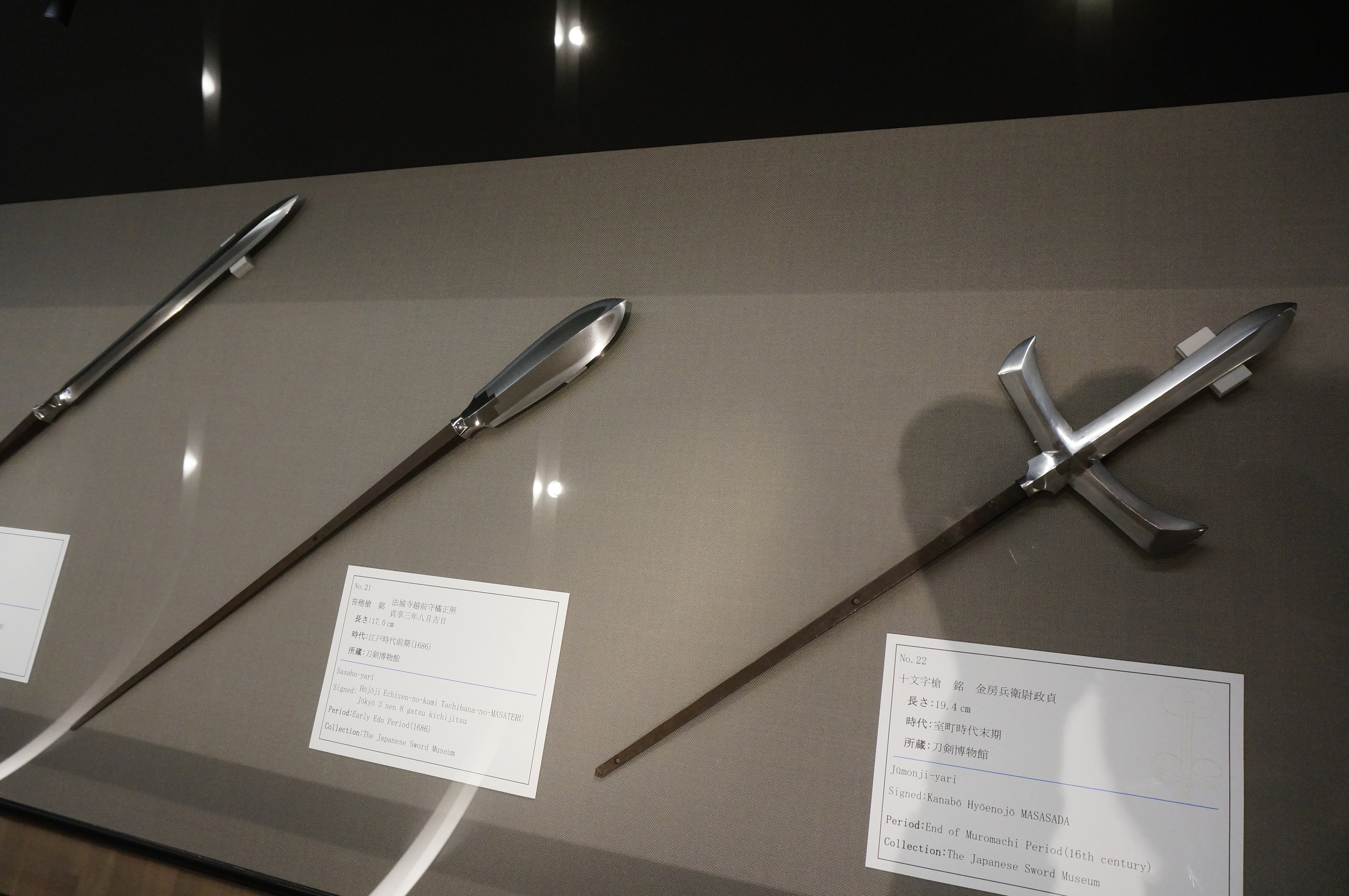
- Yari forged by Echizen Kanenori, 17th century, Edo period (left), sasaho yari forged by Tachibana no Terumasa, 1686, Edo period (middle), and jūmonji yari forged by Kanabo Hyoeno jo Masasada, 16th century, Muromachi period (right)
- Type: Spear
- Place of origin: Japan

Production history
- Produced: Nara period (710–794) for hoko, Muromachi period (1333–1568) for yari, since 1334

Specifications
- Mass: 1.27 kg (2.8 lb)
- Length: 1–6 m (3 ft 3 in – 19 ft 8 in)
- Blade length: 15–60 cm (5.9–23.6 in)
- Blade type: multiple blade shapes
- Hilt type: Wood, horn, lacquer
- Scabbard/sheath: Lacquered wood

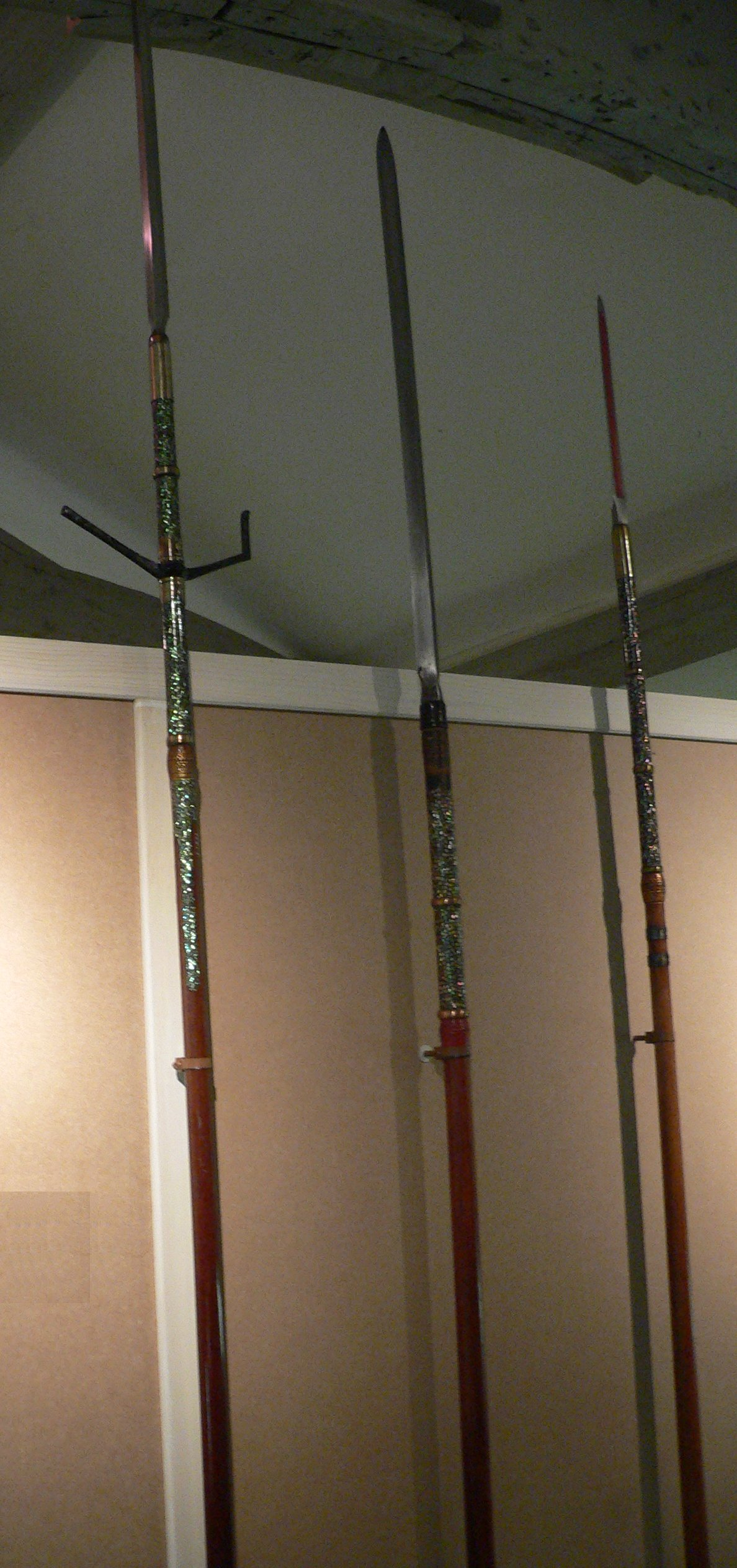
Three yari (Kagi yari, omi yari, and su yari) mounted in koshirae, including one with an asymmetrical crossbar (hadome)

Yari (槍) is the term for a traditionally-made Japanese sword (日本刀, nihontō) in the form of a spear, or more specifically, the straight-headed spear. The martial art of wielding the yari is called sōjutsu.

== History ==
The forerunner of the yari is thought to be the hoko, a lance derived from the qiang (Chinese spear). These hoko are thought to be from the Nara period (710–794). Another polearm, the naginata (glaive), became important in the late Heian.

The term yari appeared for the first time in written sources in 1334, but this type of spear did not become popular until the late 15th century. The original warfare of the bushi was not a thing for commoners; it was a ritualized combat usually between two warriors, who would challenge each other via mounted archery. In the late Heian, battles on foot began to increase, and naginata, a bladed polearm, became a main weapon along with the yumi (Japanese longbow).

The attempted Mongol invasions of Japan in 1274 and 1281 provoked a shift in weaponry and in warfare. The Mongols employed Chinese and Korean footmen wielding long pikes and fought in tight formations. They moved in large units to stave off cavalry. Polearms were of much greater military use than swords due to their significantly longer reach, lighter weight per unit length (though overall a polearm would be hefty), and excellent piercing ability.

In the Nanboku-chō period, battles on foot by groups became the mainstream, and the naginata appeared. However, yari were not yet the main weapon. However, after the decade-long Ōnin War (1467-77) in the Muromachi period, large-scale group battles started, employing ashigaru (peasant foot troops), who fought on foot and in close quarters, and the yari, yumi, and, after 1543, the tanegashima (Japanese matchlock) quickly became the most utilised weapons.

This shift made the naginata and traditional tachi (sabre) styles obsolete on the battlefield. These were often replaced with the tachi known as the nagamaki (long-handled sword) and the short, lightweight katana.

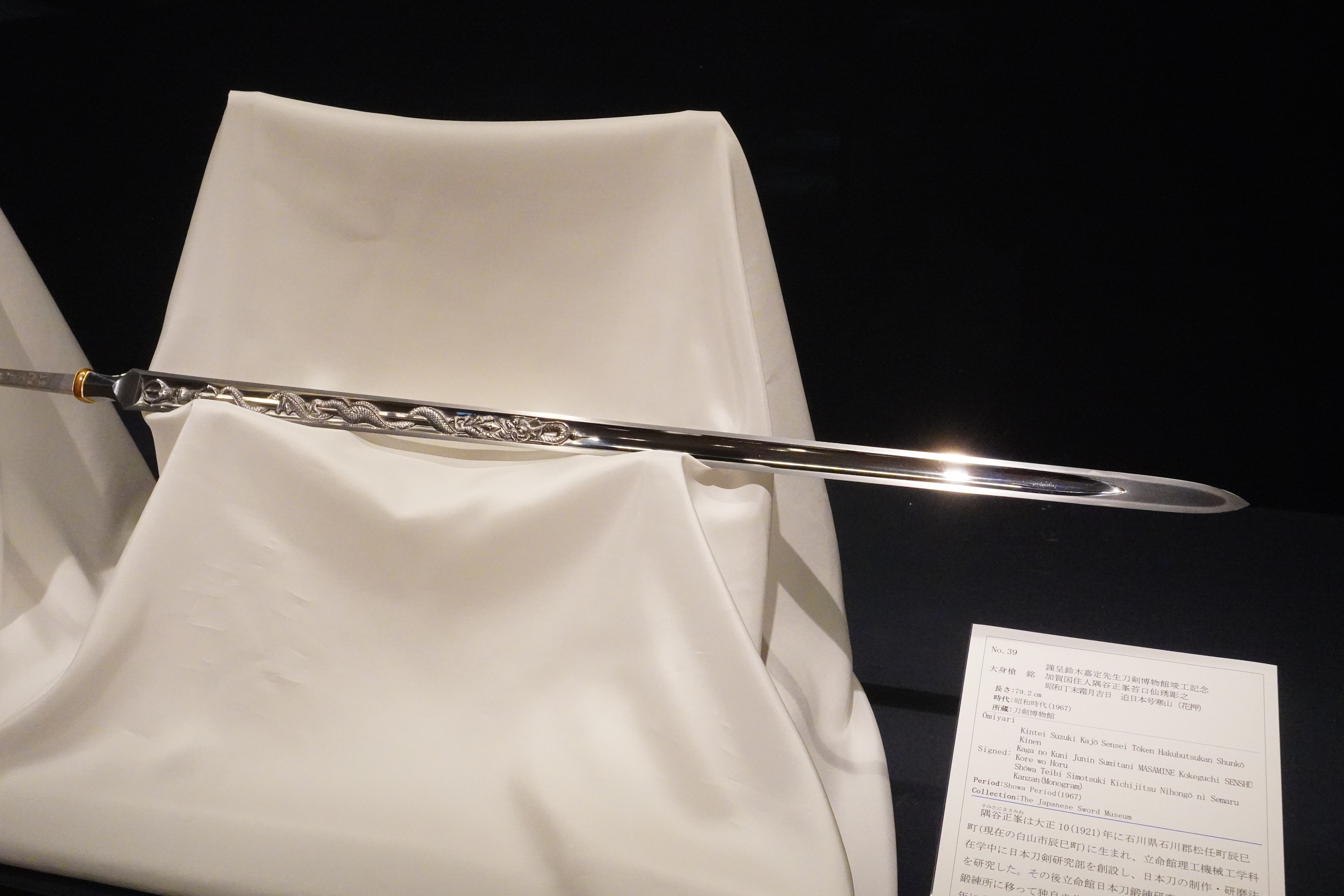
A reproduction of the Nihon-go, one of the Three Great Spears of Japan. Forged in 1967 by Living National Treasure Masamine Sumitani and engraved with a horimono by Sensyū Kokeguchi.

Around the latter half of the 16th century, ashigaru wielding pikes (nagae yari) with a length of 4.5 to 6.5 m (15 to 21 ft) became the main forces in armies. They formed lines with soldiers bearing Tanegashima and short spears. Pikemen formed a two- or three-row line and were trained to move their pikes in unison under command.

Not only ashigaru but also samurai fought on the battlefield, using the yari as one of their main weapons. For example, Honda Tadakatsu was famous as a master of one of the Three Great Spears of Japan, the Tonbokiri (蜻蛉切). One of the Three Great Spears of Japan, the Nihongō (ja:日本号)) was treasured as a gift, and its ownership changed to Emperor Ōgimachi, then the Shoguns Ashikaga Yoshiaki, Oda Nobunaga, Toyotomi Hideyoshi, Fukushima Masanori, and so on, and has been handed down to the present day.

In the Edo period, the yari fell into disuse. Greater emphasis was placed on small-scale, close-quarters combat, so the convenience of swords led to their dominance, and polearms and archery lost their practical value. During the peaceful Edo, yari were still produced (sometimes by renowned swordsmiths), although they were primarily used as ceremonial or police weapons.

== Description ==
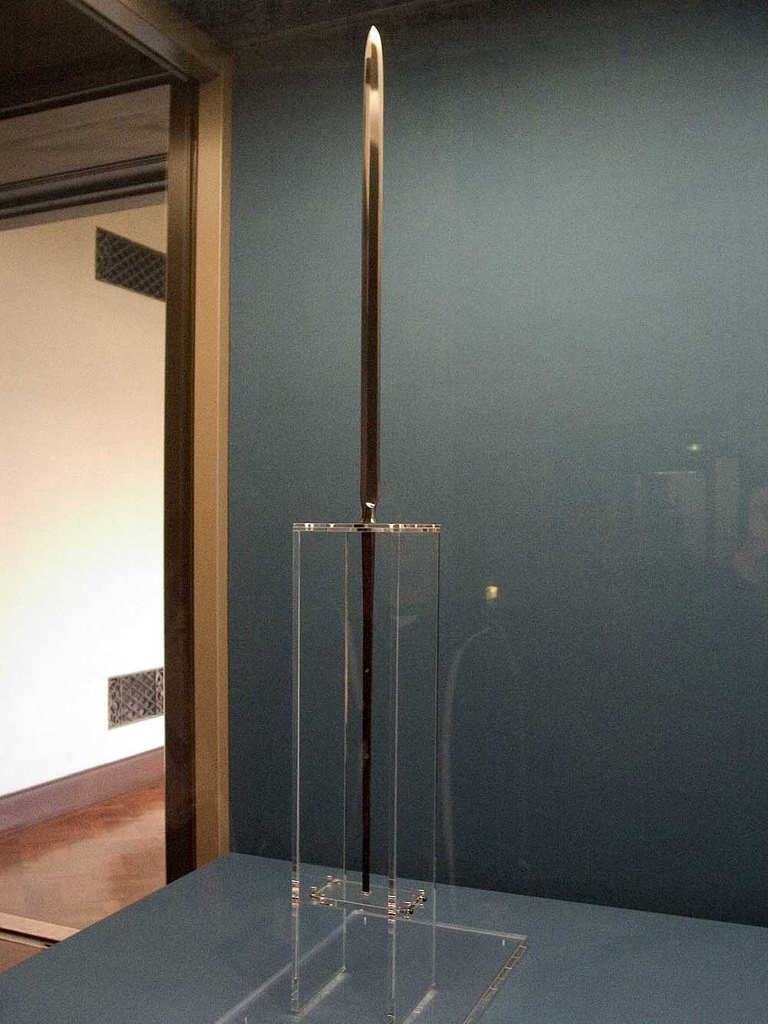
Omi yari (large spear), Tokyo national museum

Yari were characterized by a straight blade that could be anywhere from several centimeters to 3 feet (0.91 m) or more in length. The blades were made of the same steel (tamahagane) from which traditional Japanese swords and arrowheads were forged, and were very durable. Throughout history many variations of the straight yari blade were produced, often with protrusions on a central blade. Yari blades often had an extremely long tang (nakago; 中心); typically it would be longer than the sharpened portion of the blade. The tang protruded into a reinforced hollow portion of the handle (tachiuchi or tachiuke) resulting in a very stiff shaft making it nearly impossible for the blade to fall or break off.

The shaft (nagaye or ebu) came in many different lengths, widths, and shapes; made of hardwood and covered in lacquered bamboo strips, these came in oval, round, or polygonal cross section. These in turn were often wrapped in metal rings or wire (dogane), and affixed with a metal pommel (ishizuki; 石突) on the butt end. Yari shafts were often decorated with inlays of metal or semiprecious materials such as brass pins, lacquer, or flakes of pearl. A sheath (saya; 鞘) was also part of a complete yari.

== Variations of yari blades ==
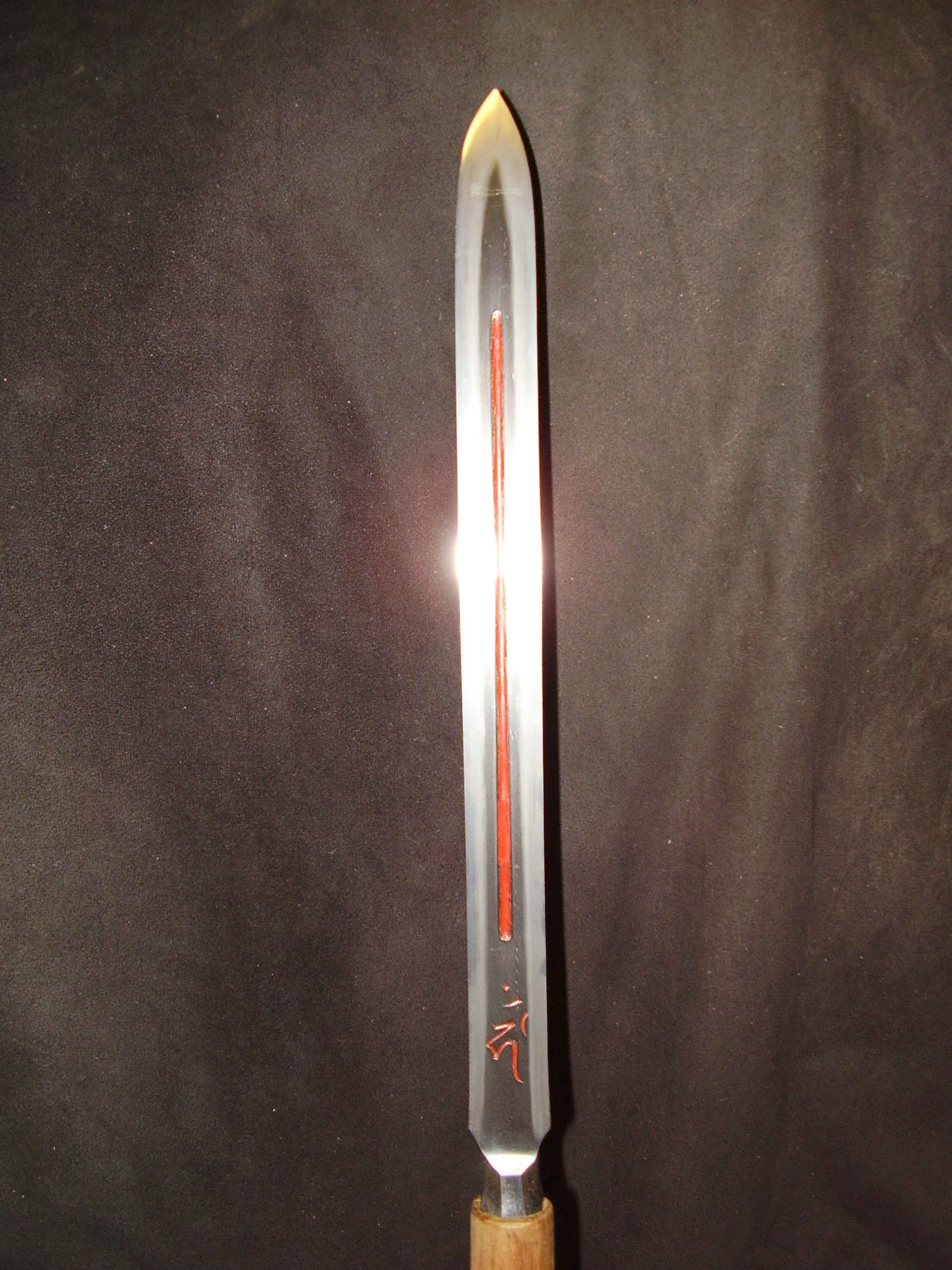
Straight yari (su yari), detail view. Blade is about 1 shaku (approx. 30 cm (12 in) in length).

Various types of yari points or blades existed. The most common blade was a straight, flat design that resembles a straight-bladed double edged dagger. This type of blade could cut as well as stab and was sharpened like a razor edge. Though yari is a catchall term, the simple su yari (choku-sō) or straight spear is distinguished from the kama yari, which can have additional horizontal blades. Yari can also be distinguished by the types of blade cross-section: the triangular sections were called sankaku yari and the diamond sections were called ryō-shinogi yari.

- Sankaku yari (三角槍, "triangle spear") have a point that resembles a narrow spike with a triangular cross-section. A sankaku yari therefore had no cutting edge, only a sharp point at the end. The sankaku yari was thus best suited for penetrating armor, even armor made of metal, which a standard yari was not as suited to. There are two types of sankaku yari: sei sankaku yari, yari blades with a triangular, equilateral cross section, and hira sankaku yari, yari with a triangular, isosceles-shaped cross section.
- Ryō-shinogi yari, a blade with a diamond shaped cross section.
- Fukuro yari (袋槍, "bag" or "socket spear") were mounted to a shaft by means of a metal socket instead of a tang. The socket and blade are forged from a single piece.
- Kikuchi yari (菊池槍, "spear of Kikuchi") were one of the rarest types of yari, possessing only a single edge. This could be used to hack at foes and closely resembled a tantō. Kikuchi yari are the only yari which use a habaki.
- Yajiri nari yari (鏃形槍, "spade-shaped spear") had a very broad, "spade-shaped" head. Yajiri nari yari often had a pair of holes centred between the two ovoid halves.

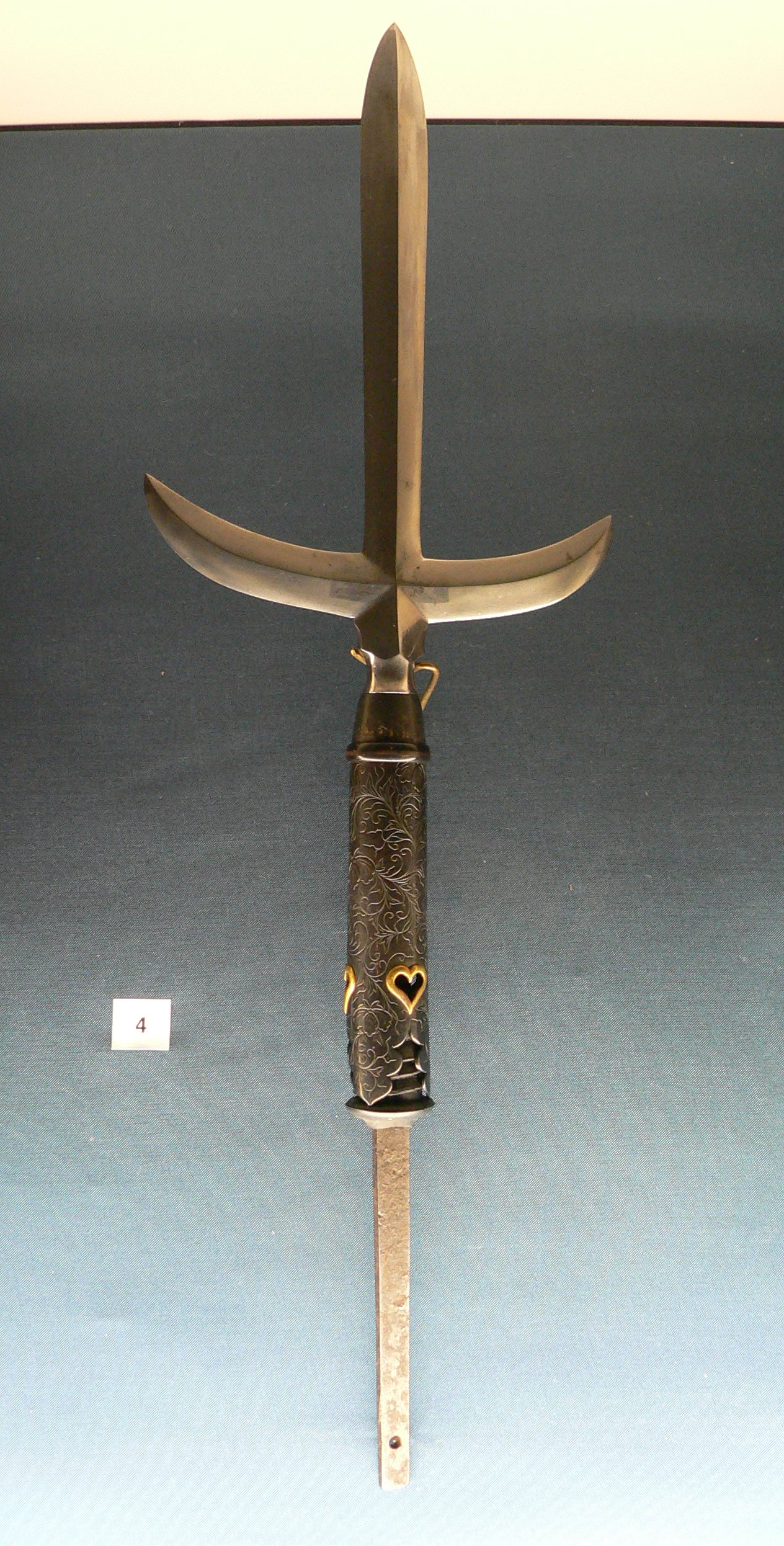
Jumonji yari spearhead with metal collar; note the long tang, approximately equal to the blade-length

- Jūmonji yari (十文字槍, "cross-shaped spear"), also called magari yari (曲槍, "curved spear"), looked something similar to a trident or ranseur, and brandishing two curved side blades pointing upward. It is occasionally referred to as maga yari in modern weaponry texts.
  - Jogekama yari, a jūmonji yari with one side blade pointing downward and one side blade pointing upward.
  - Karigata yari, a jūmonji yari with the two side blades pointing downward.
  - Gyaku yari, a jūmonji yari with the two side blades resembling a pair of buffalo horns.
- Kama-yari (鎌槍, "sickle spear") gets its name from a peasant weapon or tool called kama (lit. "sickle" or "scythe").

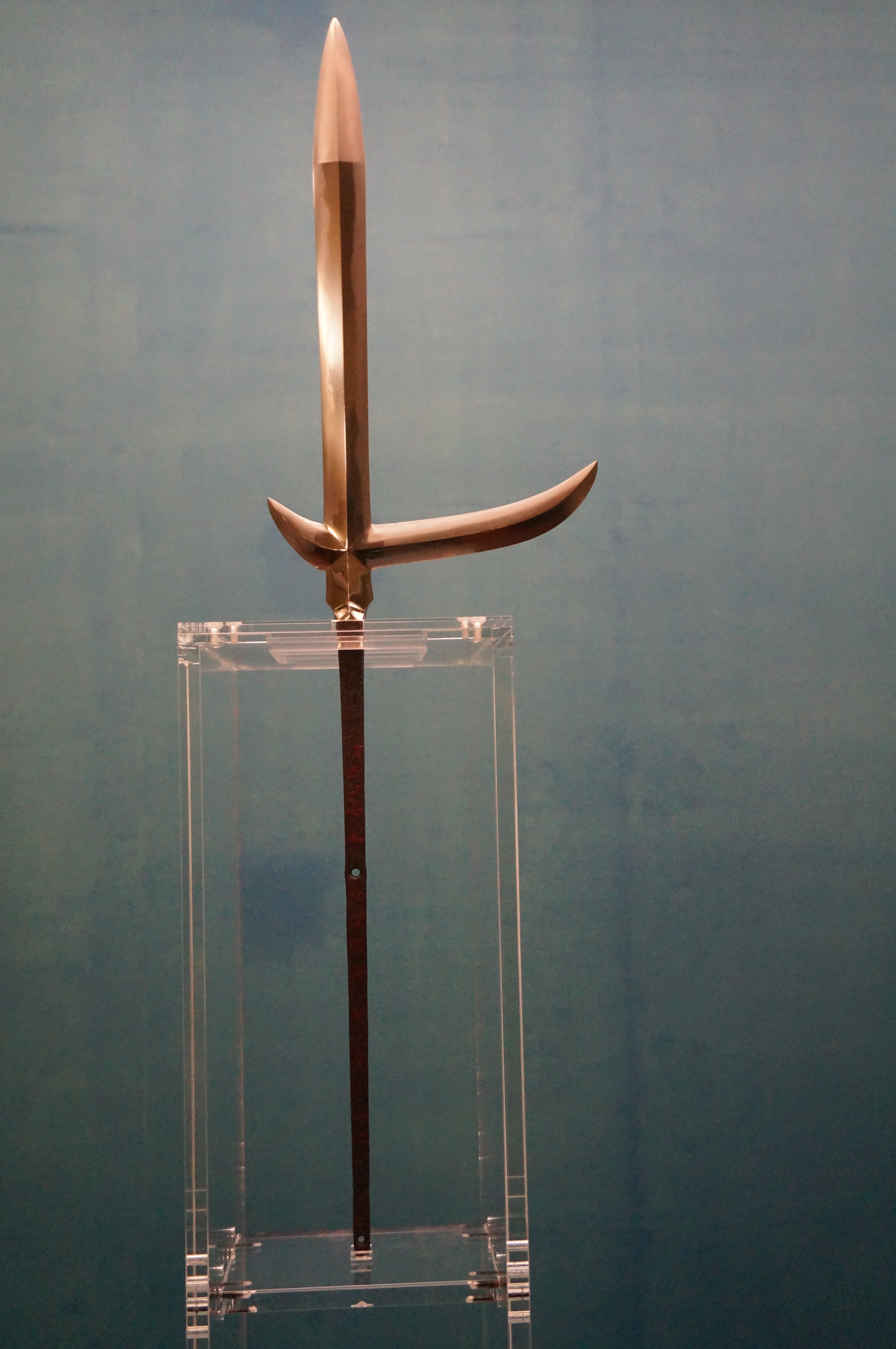
Katakama yari spearhead owned by Kato Kiyomasa. Muromachi period, 16th century, Tokyo National Museum

- Kata kamayari (片鎌槍, "single-sided sickle spear") had a weapon design sporting a blade that was two-pronged. Instead of being constructed like a military fork, a straight blade (as in su yari) was intersected just below its midsection by a perpendicular blade. This blade was slightly shorter than the primary, had curved tips forming a parallelogram, and was offset so that only 1/6 of its length extended to the opposite side, forming a rough L-shape.
- Tsuki nari yari (月形槍, "moon-shaped spear") barely looked like a spear at all. A polearm that had a crescent blade for a spearhead, which could slash and hook.
- Kagi yari (鉤槍, "hook spear") was a key-shaped spear with a long blade with a side hook much like that found on a fauchard. It could be used to capture another weapon or even to dismount cavalry.
- Bishamon yari (毘沙門槍) possessed some of the most ornate designs for any spear. Running parallel to the long central blade were two crescent-shaped blades facing outward. They were attached in two locations by short cross bars, making the head look somewhat like a fleur-de-lis.
- Hoko yari, an old form of yari possibly from the Nara period (710–794), a guards spear with 6 ft (1.8 m) pole and 8 in (200 mm) blade either leaf-shaped or waved (like keris); a sickle-shaped horn projected on one or both sides at the joint of blade. The hoko yari had a hollow socket like the later period fukuro yari for the pole to fit into rather than a long tang.
- Sasaho yari (笹穂槍), a broad yari described as being "leaf-shaped" or "bamboo leaf-shaped".
- Su yari (素槍, "simple spear") (also known as sugu yari), a straight double edged blade.
- Omi no yari (omi yari), an extra long su yari blade.
- Makura-yari (枕槍, "pillow spear")
- Choku-yari (直槍, straight spear")

== Variations of yari shafts ==
A yari shaft can range in length from 1–6 metres (3 ft 3 in – 19 ft 8 in), with some in excess of 6 metres.

- Nagae yari ("long shafted spear"): 16.4 to 19.7 ft (5.0 to 6.0 m) long, a type of pike used by ashigaru. It was especially used by Oda clan ashigaru beginning from the reign of Oda Nobunaga; samurai tradition of the time held that the soldiers of the rural province of Owari were among the weakest in Japan. Kantō was a chaotic place; Kansai was home to the Shogunate, and the Uesugi, Takeda, Imagawa, and Hojo clans, as well as pirate raiders from Shikoku. Additionally, Kyushu was home of one of the most warmongering clans in Japan, the Shimazu clan. Because of this, Nobunaga armed his underperforming ashigaru soldiers extra-long pikes in order for them to be more effective against armoured opponents and cavalry, and fighting in groups and formations.
- Mochi yari (持ち槍, "hand spear"), a long spear used by ashigaru and samurai.
- Kuda yari (管槍, "tube spear"). The shaft goes through a hollow metal tube that allowed the spear to be twisted during thrusting. This style of sojutsu is typified in the school Owari Kan Ryū.
- Makura yari (枕槍, "pillow spear"). A yari with a short simple shaft that was kept by the bedside for home protection.
- Te yari (手槍, "hand spear"). A yari with a short shaft that was used by samurai and police to help capture criminals.

== Gallery ==
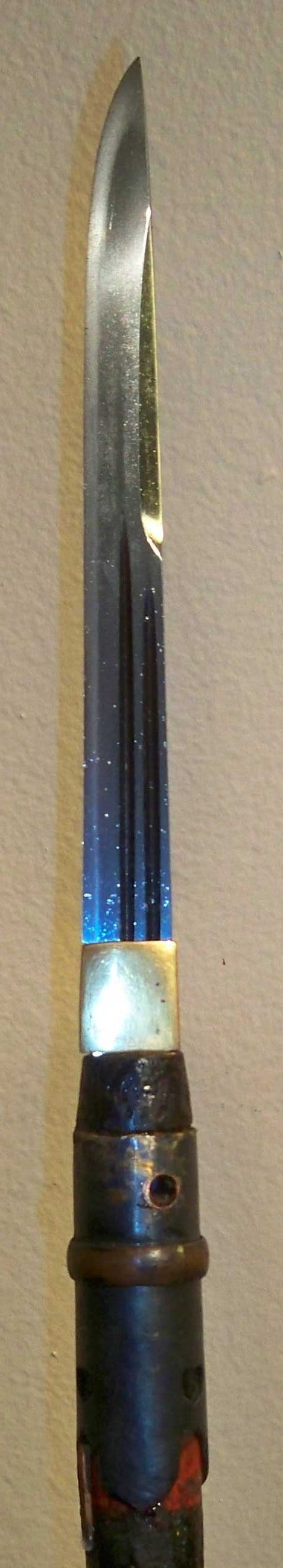
Kikuchi yari

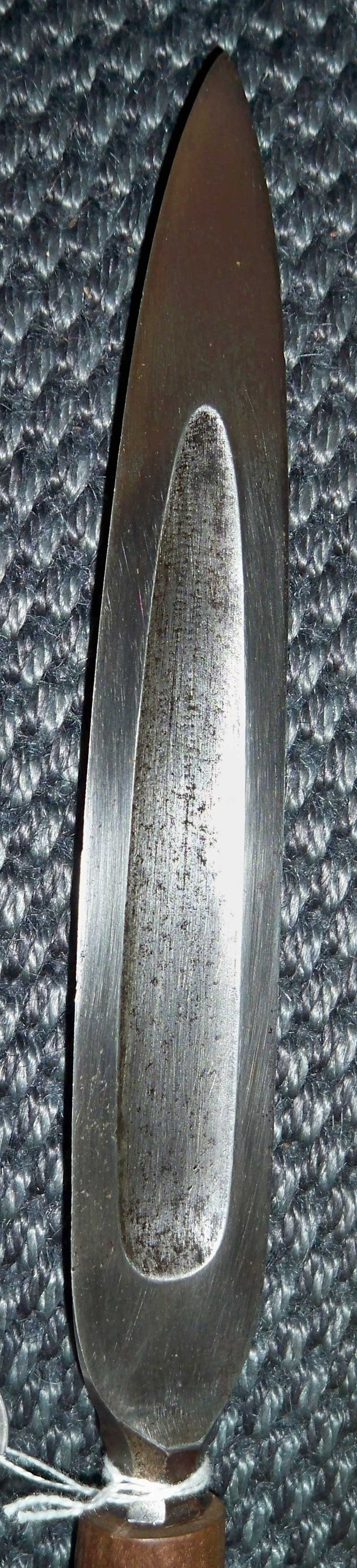
Sasaho yari

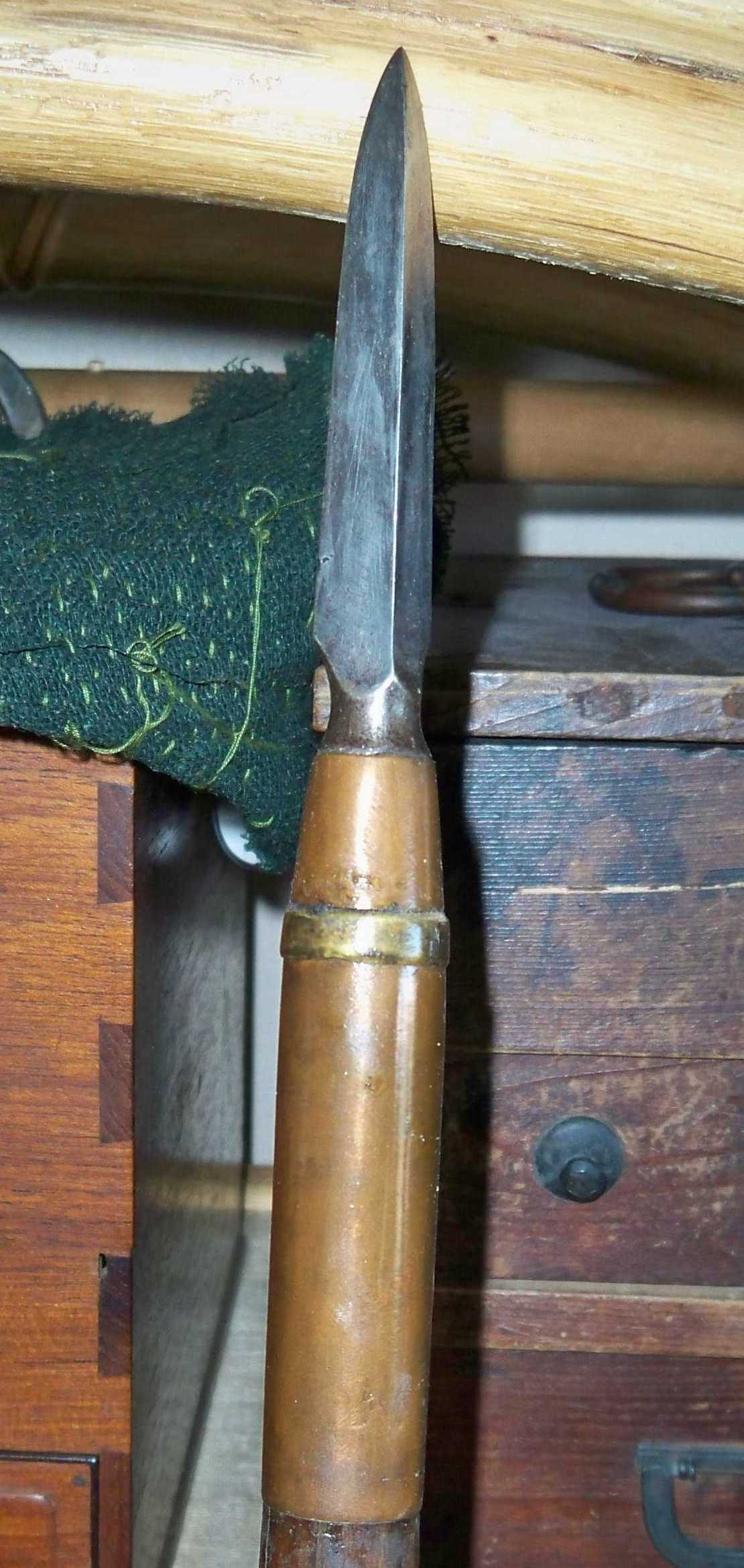
Sankaku yari

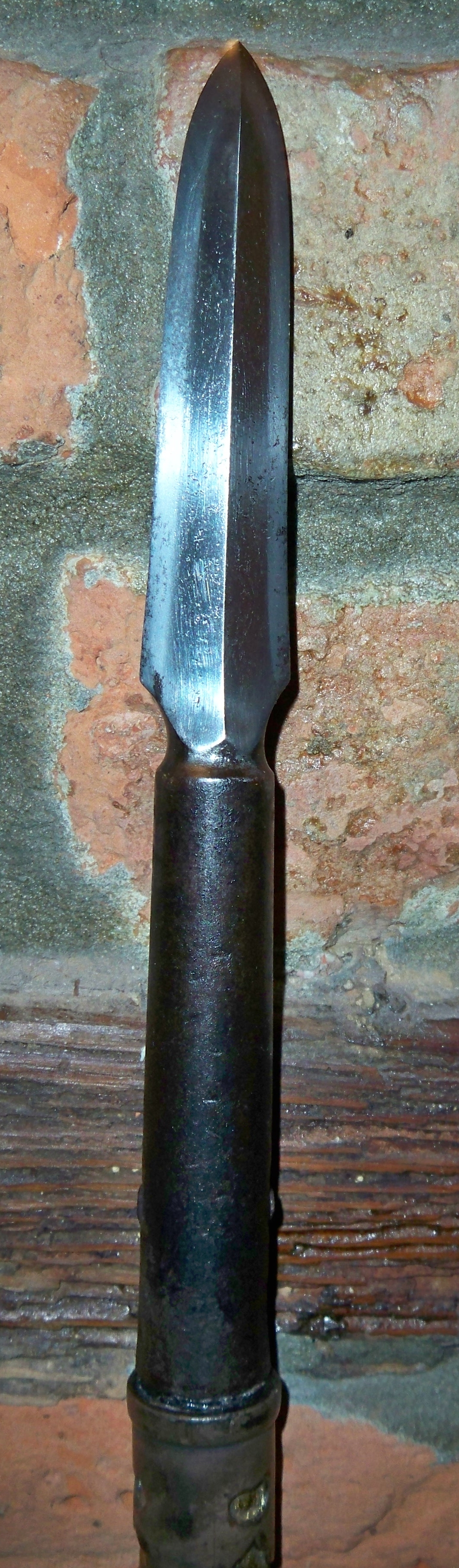
Ryo shinogi fukuro yari

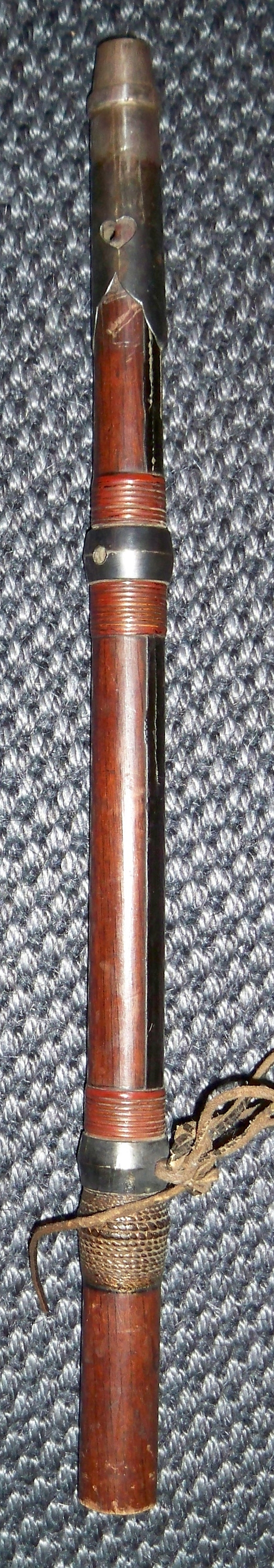
Tachiuchi or tachiuke, the reinforced upper part of the shaft

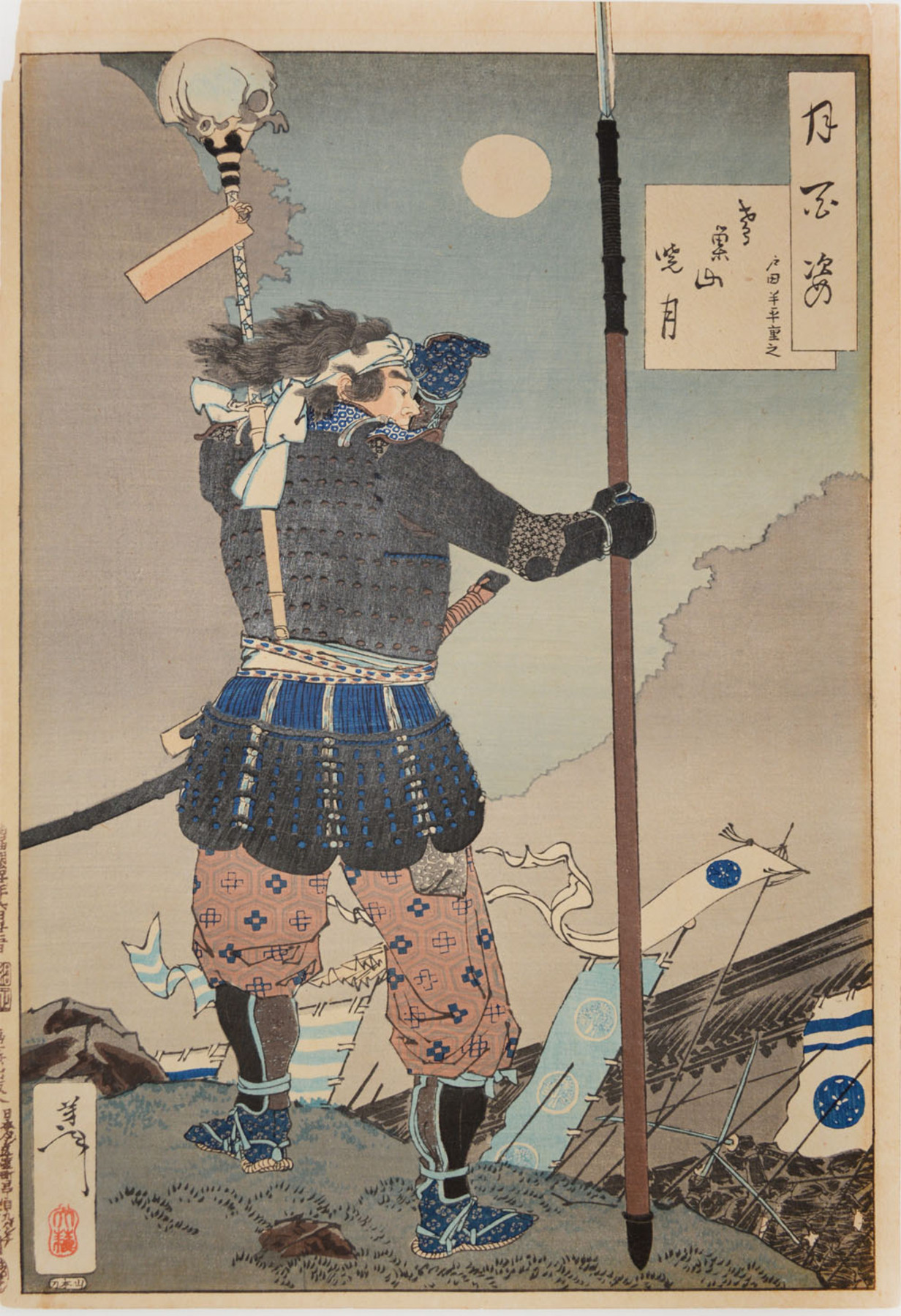
Ukiyo-e print of a samurai general holding a yari in his right hand

== See also ==
- Japanese sword
- Three Great Spears of Japan
- Nunti Bo
- Naginata
