= Kihon =

Japanese term for basic budō techniques

Kihon (基本, きほん) is a Japanese term meaning "basics" or "fundamentals." The term is used to refer to the basic techniques that are taught and practiced as the foundation of most Japanese martial arts.

The practice and mastery of kihon is essential to all advanced training, and includes the practice of correct body form and breathing, while practicing basics such as stances, punches, kicks, blocks, and thrusts, but it also includes basic representative kata.

Kihon is not only practicing of techniques, it is also the budōka fostering the correct spirit and attitude at all times.

Kihon techniques tend to be practiced often, in many cases during each practice session. They are considered fundamental to mastery and improvement of all movements of greater complexity. Kihon in martial arts can be seen as analogous to basic skills in, for example, basketball. Professional NBA players continue to practice dribbling, passing, free throws, jump shots, etc. in an effort to maintain and perfect the more complex skills used during a basketball game.
