= Sōjutsu =

Form of Japanese martial art

Sōjutsu (槍術)
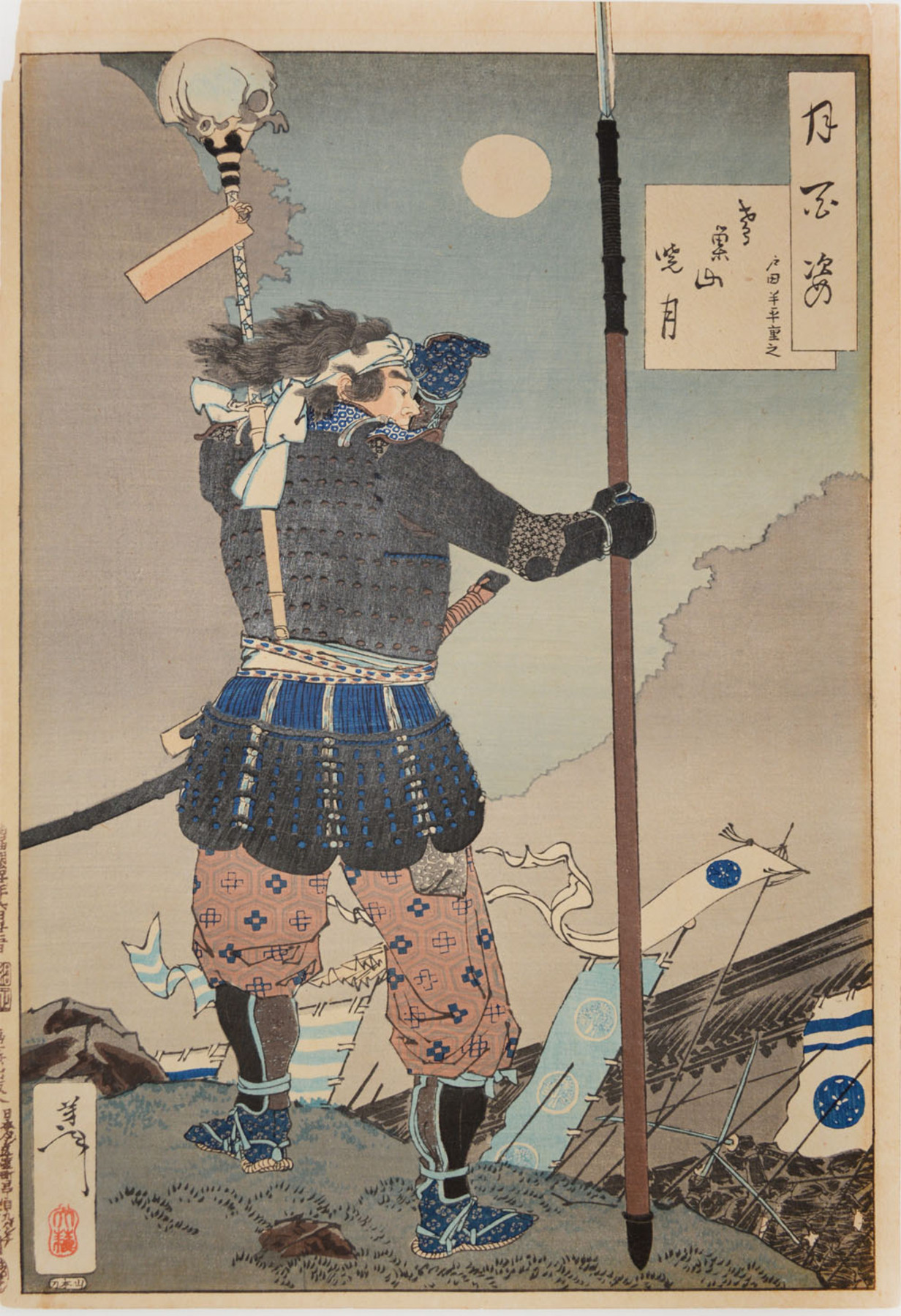
- Sengoku period samurai with a spear (yari). One Hundred Aspects of the Moon, by Yoshitoshi
- Focus: Weaponry (yari/Spear)
- Hardness: Non-competitive
- Country of origin: Japan
- Creator: Manemu Jiefu
- Parenthood: Historical
- Olympic sport: No

Sōjutsu (槍術), meaning "art of the spear", is the Japanese martial art of fighting with a Japanese spear (槍, yari).

== Origins ==
Although the spear had a profound role in early Japanese mythology, where the islands of Japan themselves were said to be created by salt water dripping from the tip of the spear Ame-no-Nuhoko (Heavenly jeweled spear), as a weapon the first spear prototypes were brought from mainland Asia. These early versions were not seen as suitable by the Japanese, who later redesigned them once technology permitted.

== Use and popularity ==
The Yari was a popular weapon throughout the feudal period of Japan, being cheaper to produce and requiring less training than other contemporary battlefield weapons, and lending itself to close formations of ashigaru troops, in conjunction with firearms upon their adoption in Japan. The height of sōjutsu's popularity was immediately after the Mongol invasions of the 13th century, who themselves used spearmen in great numbers.

The Japanese ultimately modified the heads of their spears into a number of different variations, leading to the use of the spear both on foot and from horseback, and for slashing as well as the primary use of attacking with thrusts.

== Modern practice ==
Sōjutsu is typically only a single component of curriculum in comprehensive traditional (koryū) schools. The still extant Tenshin Shōden Katori Shintō-ryū claims to be the first school to include sōjutsu in its formal curriculum, and another very well known school of sōjutsu is the Hōzōin-ryū. While today there are very few schools still teaching sōjutsu, at one time there were as many as 450.

== See also ==
- Aikido
- Jō
- Jūkendō
- Naginata
