= All Japan Iaidō Federation =

Zen Nippon Iaidō Renmei (ZNIR) 全日本居合道連盟
- Founded: 1948
- Type: Martial Arts organization
- Members: 20000+
- Official language: Japanese
- President: Fukui Masato
- Key people: Ikeda Hayato, Kōno Hyakuren, Ikeda Seikō

All Japan Iaidō Federation (全日本居合道連盟, Zen Nippon Iaidō Renmei (ZNIR)), or abbreviated Zen Nichi I (全日居) or Zen I Ren (全居連), is a national non-governmental organization in Japan, founded in 1948 by Ikeda Hayato (later Prime Minister of Japan). The ZNIR was officially formed and registered with the government on May 5, 1954, by Iaido practitioners from multiple styles. The ZNIR is Japan's oldest and largest Iaidō-only specialist organization. It holds yearly National Kyoto Iaidō Event in Kyoto, Japan typically from May 3 to May 5 and Hamamatsu National Iaidō Competition Tournament in Hamamatsu city in October. ZNIR also holds many other regional Iaidō tournaments regularly throughout the years.

== History ==
The All Japan Iaido Federation was founded in 1948, and recognized officially as an organization with the Japanese Government in 1954.

In 1956, the ZNIR established 全日本居合道連盟刀法 (Zen Nippon Iaidō Renmei Tōhō) in an effort to unify practitioners and create a common set to fairly grade each practitioner from varying styles.

== Structure ==
ZNIR has ten Chiku Renmei (district federations):

- Kantō region
- Kinki region
- Chūbu region
- Tōkai region
- Chūgoku region
- Shikoku region
- Kyushu/Okinawa region
- Hokuriku region
- Tōhoku region
- Hokkaido region

== Styles ==
The All Japan Iaido Federation contains multiple traditional styles, in no particular order:

- Musō Jikiden Eishin-ryū
- Sekiguchi-ryū
- Shinkage-ryū
- Musō Shinden-ryū
- Mugai-ryū
- Shinden-ryū
- Hōki-ryū
- Araki Muninsai-ryū
- Shindō Munen-ryū
- Hokushin Itto-ryū

=== Shared Techniques, or Tōhō (刀法) ===
Due to the varying styles in the All Japan Iaido Federation, a set of common techniques, or waza, was created in 1956 to examine a practitioner's skill in a fair manner, each borrowed from five major styles in the Federation.

This set is known collectively as "Tōhō" (刀法):

1. Mae-giri from Musō Jikiden Eishin-ryū, founded during the late Muromachi period - ca. 1590
2. Zengo-giri from Mugai-ryū, founded in 1695
3. Kiri-age from Shindō Munen-ryū, founded in the early 1700s
4. Shihō-giri from Suiō-ryū, founded during the early Edo period - ca. 1615
5. Kissaki-gaeshi from Hōki-ryū, founded during the late Muromachi period - ca.1590

== Events ==
Other than the Kyoto Iaidō Taikai(tournament) in May, the ZNIR also holds a Zenkoku Kyōgi Taikai in the fall of every year. Each Chiku Renmei(district) also hold their own local Iaidō tournament and exam.

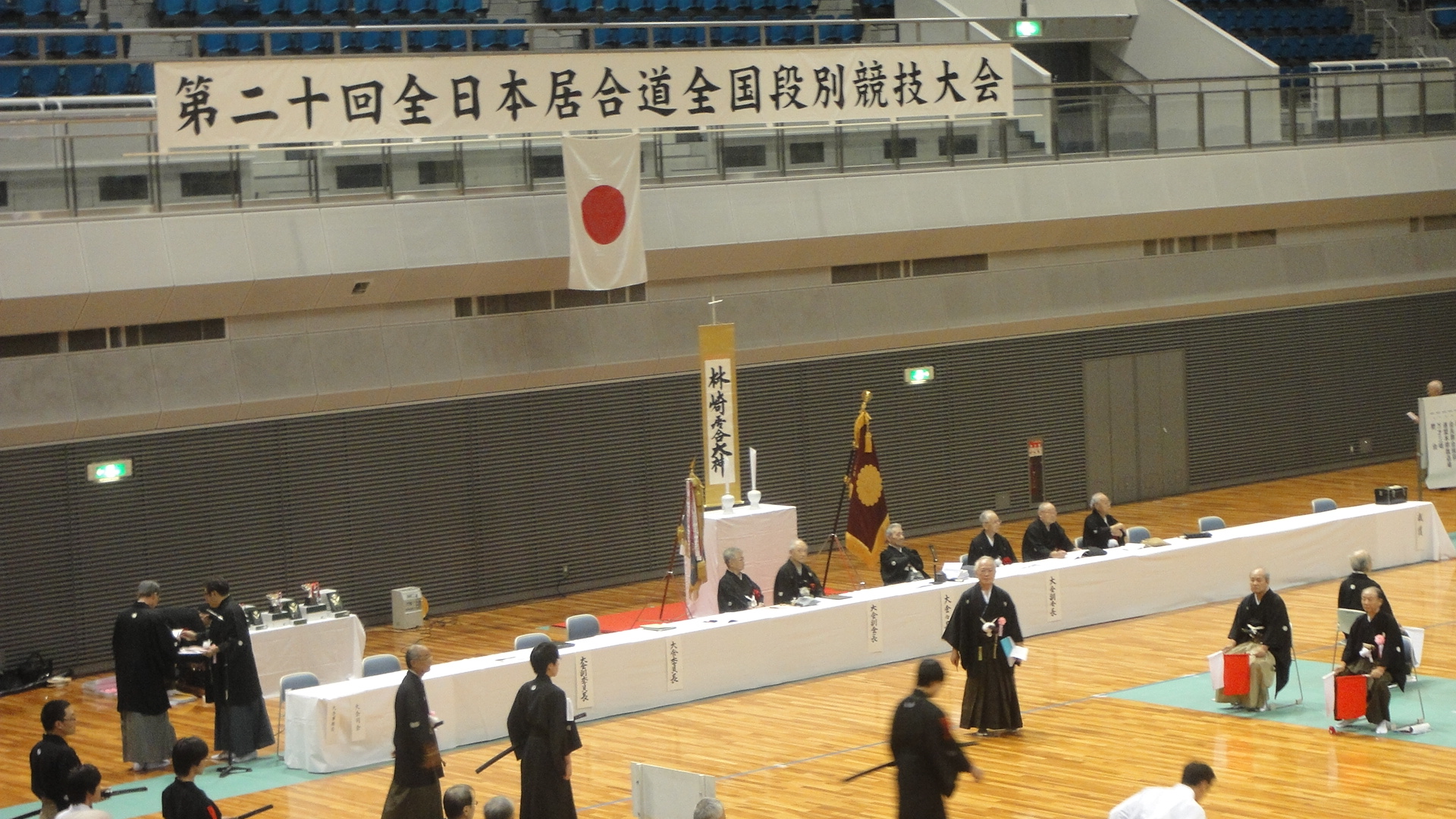
All Japan Iaidō Federation Tournament

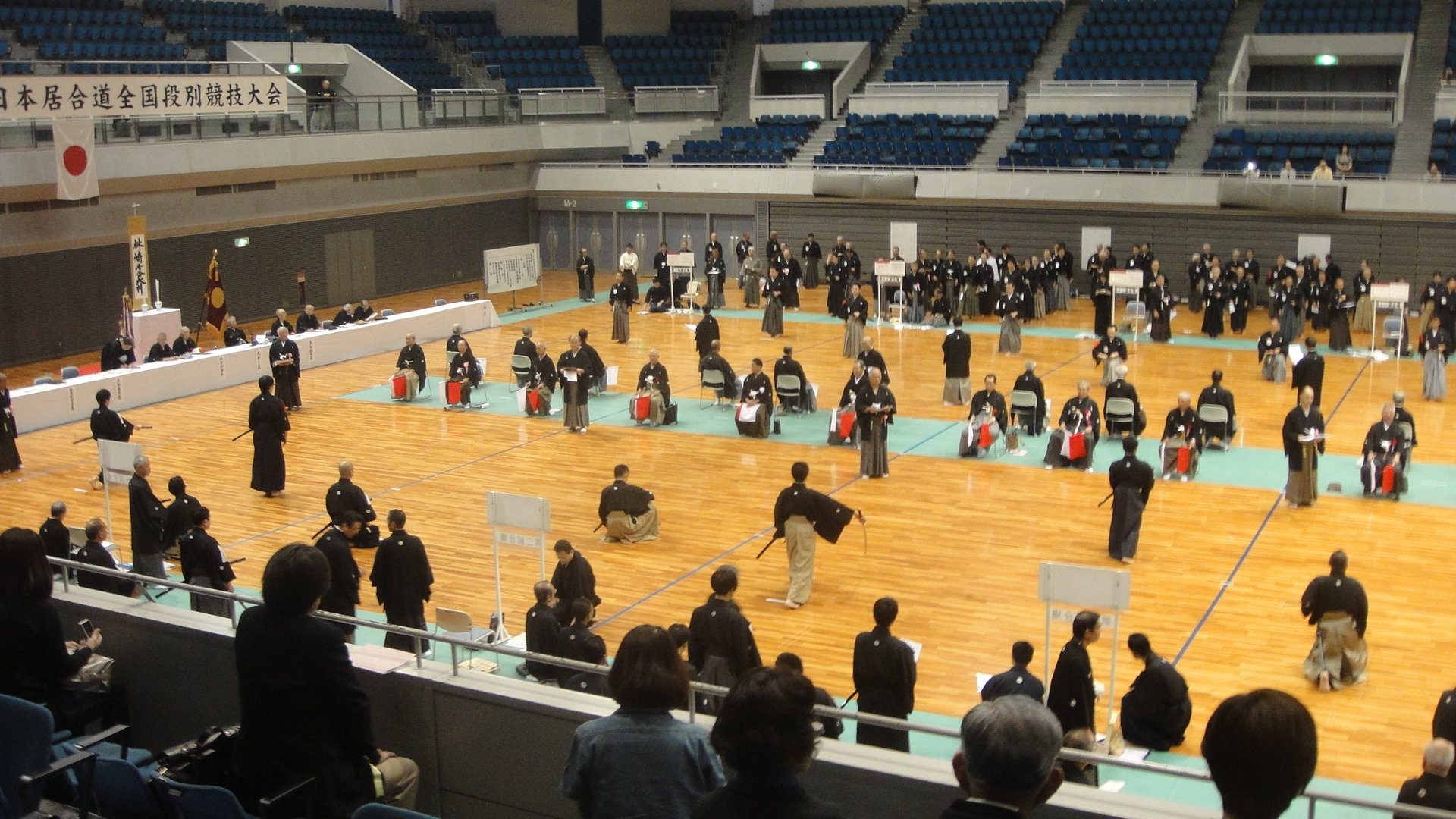
All Japan Iaidō Federation Tournament

== Ranking System ==
The All Japan Iaidō Federation grants ranks similarly to other Japanese martial arts organizations, with Dan and Shōgō (titles) both granted to practitioners once they reach certain levels of competency and skill.

After Mudansha (無段者, no Dan), there are:

- Sho Dan (初段, 1st Dan rank)
- Ni Dan (弐段, 2nd Dan rank)
- San Dan (参段, 3rd Dan rank)
- Yon Dan or Yo Dan (四段, 4th Dan rank)
- Go Dan (五段, 5th Dan rank)
- Roku Dan (六段, 6th Dan rank)
- Renshi (錬士 or "Polished/Forged Instructor")
- Nana Dan or Shichi Dan (七段, 7th Dan rank)
- Kyoshi (教士 or "Advanced Senior Teacher")
- Hachi Dan (八段, 8th Dan rank)
- Jun Hanshi (準範士 or "Associate Hanshi")
- Hanshi (範士 or "Senior expert")
- Kyu Dan or Ku Dan (九段, 9th Dan rank)
- Jū Dan (十段, 10th Dan rank)
- Meijin (名人 or "Excellent/Brilliant person", refers to a highly skilled grand-master. Only for president of the ZNIR.)

Like other martial arts organizations, Shōgō (title) are granted, however they are considered to be levels or rankings similarly to Dan, and are typically granted between the various Dan levels above Roku Dan.

For example, after Roku Dan and a certain amount of time has passed, the practitioner will test for Renshi at their next grading.
