= Zen Nippon Kendō Renmei Iaidō =

Standardized style of iaido

Zen Nippon Kendō Renmei Iaidō is the iaidō style of the All Japan Kendo Federation (AJKF, Zen Nippon Kendo Renmei or ZNKR). This style of standardised iaido is also known as Seitei Iaido (制定 居合道) or Zenkenren Iaido (全剣連 居合道).

== History ==
The AJKF was founded in 1952, immediately following the restoration of Japanese independence and the subsequent lift of the ban on martial arts in Japan. To popularise iaido and to make it easier for kendo practitioners to learn iaido, an expert committee was established by the AJKF to review the situation. The committee subsequently selected the basic techniques from major iaido schools to form the curriculum of Zen Nippon Kendo Renmei Iaido. In 1969, the AJKF introduced its seitei curriculum of seven standardised iaido kata. These were drawn from elements of the major sword schools, including Musō Jikiden Eishin-ryū, Musō Shinden-ryū and Hoki-ryū. Three more kata were added in 1981 and two more in 2000, increasing the number of seitei iaido kata to the current twelve. These kata are officially known as the "All Japan Kendo Federation Iai" (全日本剣道連盟居合, Zen Nippon Kendō Renmei Iai), or Zen Ken Ren Iai (全剣連居合) and commonly referred to as seitei or seitei-gata.

The twelve seitei-gata are standardised for the tuition, promotion and propagation of iaido within the kendo federations. Although not all kendo dojo teach seitei iaido, the AJKF uses them as a standard for their exams and shiai. As a result, seitei iaido has become the most widely recognised form of iaido in Japan and the rest of the world.

== Seitei iaido by AJKF ==
Dojo that are affiliated with the All Japan Kendo Federation, generally begin practice with these twelve forms or seitei-gata before going on to teach any 'classical' forms of iaidō that may also be included in their curriculum.

1. Mae (前). Front. Commencing from a kneeling position, forestalling a frontal attack.
2. Ushiro (後ろ). Rear. Commencing from a kneeling position, forestalling an attack from the rear.
3. Ukenagashi (受け流し) Receive, Parry and Cut. Commencing from a kneeling position, parrying an attack from the left.
4. Tsuka-ate (柄当て). Striking with the Hilt. Commencing from a raised knee, seated position, forestalling two attackers, front and rear.
5. Kesagiri (袈裟切り). Diagonal Cut. Commencing from a standing position, forestalling an approaching attacker.
6. Morote-tsuki (諸手突き). Two-Hand Thrust. Commencing from a standing position, forestalling three approaching attackers, two in front and one behind.
7. Sanpōgiri (三方切り). Three Direction Cut. Commencing from a standing position, forestalling three approaching attackers, one each to the right, left and front.
8. Ganmen-ate (顔面当て). Hit to the Face. Commencing from a standing position, forestalling two approaching attackers, front and rear.
9. Soete-tsuki (添え手突き). Joined Hand Thrust. Commencing from a standing position, forestalling an attack from the left.
10. Shihōgiri (四方切り). Four Direction Cutting. Commencing from a standing position, forestalling four approaching attackers.
11. Sōgiri (総切り). Complete Cuts. Five different and complete cuts. Commencing from a standing position.
12. Nukiuchi (抜き打ち). Sudden Draw. Avoid, then respond to an attack from the front. Commencing from a standing position.

== See also ==
- Battōjutsu
- Kenjutsu
- Kendō
