= Ōmori-ryū =

Ōmori-ryū (大森流)
- Ko-ryū

Foundation
- Founder: Ōmori Rokurōzaemon Masamitsu (大森 六郎左衛門 正光) c.1546–1621
- Period founded: Early to mid Edo period

Current information
- Current headmaster: None.

Arts taught
- Art: Description
- iaijutsu: Sword-drawing art

Ancestor schools
- Hasegawa Eishin-ryū, Yagyū Shinkage-ryū.

Descendant schools
- None.

Ōmori-ryū (大森流) is a iaijutsu koryū founded by Ōmori Rokurōzaemon Masamitsu (大森 六郎左衛門 正光), probably in the latter half of the seventeenth century. The techniques developed by Masamitsu were later incorporated into Hasegawa Eishin-ryū and continue to be taught to this day as the first series of kata in Musō Jikiden Eishin-ryū and Musō Shinden-ryū.

== Development ==
Ōmori Masamitsu first studied iaijutsu under the Hasegawa Eishin, the seventh headmaster of Shinmei Musō-ryū and founder of Hasegawa Eishin-ryū. He was later expelled for personal reasons and started to develop his own style. Masamitsu disagreed in particular on the use of tate-hiza and tachi-ai as practical sword drawing postures. He thus based his kata on the seiza posture as he had learned it in the Ogasawara-ryū, a school of etiquette or reishiki. Though the form of the kata themselves were taken from what he had learned with Hasegawa, they were modified to conform to the five forms of sword-drawing as taught in the Yagyū Shinkage-ryū. By devising these eleven basic techniques, he came back in the good graces of his former teacher.

This rapprochement between Hasegawa and Masamitsu had great influence on the future of both of their arts, as Masamitsu then began teaching his own style to many students of Hasegawa. These direct students include Hayashi Rokudayū Morimasa, ninth headmaster of Hasegawa Eishin-ryū and Ōguro Motoemon Kiyokatsu, the eleventh headmaster. Since that time the techniques have been passed down in both Hasegawa Eishin-ryū branches and are now found in their modern-day descendants, Musō Jikiden Eishin-ryū (無双直伝英信流), Musō Shinden Eishin-ryū (無雙神傳英信流), which is an original school of Musō Shinden-ryū, and Musō Shinden-ryū (夢想神伝流) as the entry-level (shoden) techniques.
