= Negishi Shingorō =

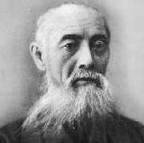
Negishi Shingorō 根岸信五郎 (1844–1913)

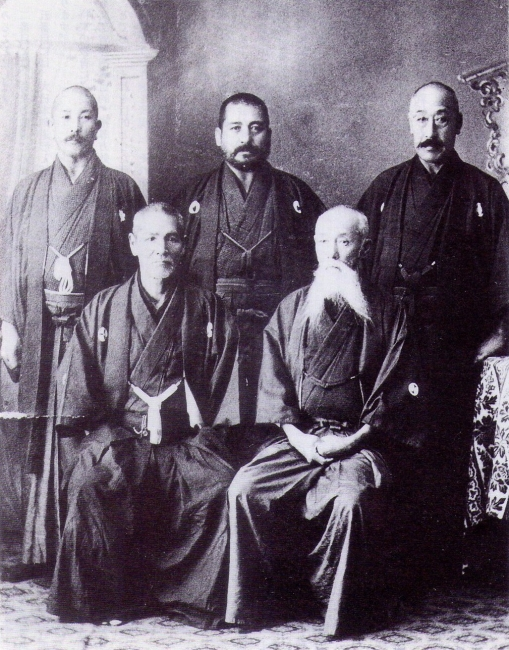
Dai Nippon Teikoku Kendo Kata committee. Negishi Shingorō (1844–1913) is sitting in the front right with Tsuji Shinpei (Shingyoto Ryu) next to him. In the back right to left: Takano Sasaburo (Itto Ryu), Monna Tadashi (Hokushin Itto Ryu) and Naito Takaharu (Hokushin Itto Ryu). The photo is from 1912.

Negishi Shingorō 根岸信五郎 (15 January 1844 – 15 September 1913) was a Samurai from Nagaoka Han in feudal Japan, was the 6th and last headmaster of the Shindō Munen-ryū from the feudal era of Japan, where this school of Japanese swordsmanship has its origin.

== Biography ==
Negishi Shingorō was born in Echigo, as Makino Shingorō, a son of the ruling family of the Echigo Nagoaka Clan. However, at a very young age he was adopted by Negishi Yorosaemon, one of the clan's magistrates. As a teenager, Shingorō developed a passion for swordsmanship, and studied from Nomura Tetsuya, the last headmaster of Nagaoka Han Den branch of Shindō Munen-ryū. In 1863 Shingorō took a temporary leave of absence from the clan in order to study Shindō Munen-ryū at the Renpeikan (練兵館) dojo in Edo (modern day Tokyo).

At the Renpeikan, Shingorō learned from Saito Yakuro and well as his sons Shintaro and Yoronosuke. He also had access to other famous instructors, and had the benefit of their advice. One year after joining the Renpeikan, Shingoro received a Shihan-dai license from Shintaro and in 1865 he received a Menkyo with an Inkyo license. Upon receiving Inkyo, Shingoro was recalled to his domain by his clan.

While in Edo, Shingorō became more and more politically outspoken, perhaps due to influence of his senpai from Choshu clan.

Nagaoka clan mobilized for war in the spring of 1868, and participated in the Boshin Wars as part of the Northern Alliance (the forces from 32 domains). From 4 May to 15 September clan fought against the Meiji Army, participating in the Battle of Hokuetsu (北越戦争), the bloodiest battle of Boshin Wars.

Shingorō managed to survive the initial conflicts uninjured. On 10 September, however, he participated in the charge to retake the castle. On 15 September 1868 he was severely wounded during the counter-attack by Meiji Army, that routed the forces of Ainu and Nagaoka. Following Boshin War, Shingorō returned to Edo, where he acted as Shintaro's successor.

In 1885 he opened the famed Yushinkan dojo (有信館道場). In 1888 he was employed by the Tokyo Metropolitan Police Force to teach Keshi-cho Ryu Kitachi/Iai and Gekiken to the Emperor's Royal Guard Detachment at Saineikan Dojo.

On 26 March 1906, Shingorō was declared Hanshi of Shindō Munen-ryū by Dai Nippon Butokukai.

Following his notoriety from winning a number of high-profile bouts, in 1912 he was asked by Dai Nippon Butoku Kai to join the committee responsible for creation of Dai Nippon Teikoku Kendo Kata, a precursor to modern Kendo-no-Kata.

One of his students was Nakayama Hakudō (1872–1958) who helped develop iaido and kendo.
