= Tamiya-ryū (Tsumaki) =

Japanese koryū martial art

Tamiya-ryu
- Ko-ryū

Foundation
- Founder: Tamiya Heibei Narimasa
- Period founded: Tenshō era (1573–1592)

Current information
- Current headmaster: Currently divided into three main branches (see article)

Arts taught
- Art: Description
- Iaijutsu: Sword drawing art
- Kenshibu: Dance with sword and fan
- Shigin: Singing of poetry

Ancestor schools
- Shin Musō Hayashizaki-ryū

Descendant schools
- Muraku-ryū, Ichinomiya-ryū, Shin Tamiya-ryū, Musō Jikiden Eishin-ryū, Musō Shinden-ryū

Tamiya-ryū (田宮流) Iaijutsu is a Japanese koryū martial art founded by Tamiya Heibei Narimasa in the late 16th century.

== Lineages ==
Three main lineages are usually recognized as being from Tamiya-ryū: Ko Tamiya-ryū, Kishū Tamiya-ryū and Shin Tamiya-ryū. However, while traditionally accepted as accurate, such classification may be subject to some level of criticism, since Shin Tamiya-ryū is a style on its own, founded by Wada Heisuke and both Ko Tamiya-ryū and Kishū Tamiya-ryū refer to the lineage transmitted in the Kishū domain (now Wakayama Prefecture).

=== Ko Tamiya-ryū (古田宮流) ===
- Founder: Hayashizaki Jinsuke Shigenobu 林崎甚助重信
- 1st generation: Tamiya Heibe Narimasa (Shigemasa) 田宮平兵衛業正
- 2nd generation: Tamiya Tsushima-no-kami Nagakatsu 田宮対馬守長勝
- 3rd generation: Tamiya Hyōenojō Nagaie 田宮兵衛尉長家
- 4th generation: Tamiya Sannosuke Tomonari 田宮三之助朝成
- 5th generation: Tamiya Jirōemon Narimichi 田宮次郎右衛門成道

It is accepted that this lineage got extant after Narimichi left no descendants. However, there is a document stating that Kishū Tamiya-ryū is the legitimate heir to Ko Tamiya-ryū.

=== Tamiya-ryū lineage to Shin Tamiya-ryū (新田宮流) ===
- Founder: Hayashizaki Jinsuke Shigenobu 林崎甚助重信
- 1st generation: Tamiya Heibe Narimasa (Shigemasa) 田宮平兵衛業正
- 2nd generation: Miwa Genbe 三輪源兵衛
- 3rd generation: Yamamoto Matabe Shōmu 山下又(亦)兵衛生夢
- 4th generation: Asahina Sukeemon Mudō 朝比奈助右衛門夢道
- 5th generation: Wada Heisuke Masakatsu 和田平助正勝, founder of Shin Tamiya-ryū

=== Kishū Tamiya-ryū (紀州田宮流) ===
The lineage widely recognized today as Tamiya-ryū is a branch of Kishū Tamiya-ryū, also called Tamiya Shinken-ryū. Another lineage that branched from Kishū Tamiya-ryū was Kubota-ha Tamiya-ryū, which had Kubota Sugane as its most famous practitioner. Shingai Tadaatsu(真貝忠篤, 1842-1920), one of the forefront leaders of Dai Nippon Butokukai, is from this lineage.

==== Kubota-ha Tamiya-ryū (窪田派田宮流) ====
- Founder: Tamiya Heibe Narimasa (Shigemasa) 田宮平兵衛業正
- 1st generation: Tamiya Tsushima-no-kami Nagakatsu 田宮対馬守長勝
- 2nd generation: Tamiya Hyōenojō Nagaie 田宮兵衛尉長家
- 3rd generation: Tamiya Sannosuke Tomonari 田宮三之助朝成
- 4th generation: Saiki San'emon Kiyokatsu 斉木三右衛門清勝
- 5th generation: Rogi Ihachirō Takahiro 露木伊八郎高寛
- 6th generation: Tsukahara Jūrōzaemon Masakatsu 塚原十郎左衛門昌勝
- 7th generation: Hirano Shōhachi Naokata 平野匠八尚賢
- 8th generation: Kubota Suketarō Sugane 窪田助太郎清音

The Tamiya-ryū/Tamiya Shinken-ryū is a lineage that got widespread in Iyo Saijō domain (now city of Saijo in Ehime Prefecture), when Matsudaira Yorizumi (1641-1711), son of Tokugawa Yorinobu (lord of Kishū domain) and nephew of Tokugawa Ieyasu, became the first Iyo Saijō domain lord, taking along with him Eda Gizaemon, a remarkable master of Tamiya-ryū, and Tsumaki Motouemon Mototaka, a master of military strategy. Tsumaki's son was Tsumaki Junjiro Motoaya, who inherited the style in the 8th month of 1797 (9th year of the Kansei Era). Since then, the Tsumaki family has kept the lineage, generation after generation.

==== Tamiya-ryū/Tamiya Shinken-ryū (田宮神剣流) ====
- Founder: Tamiya Heibe Narimasa (Shigemasa) 田宮平兵衛業正
- 1st generation: Tamiya Tsushima-no-kami Nagakatsu 田宮対馬守長勝
- 2nd generation: Eda Gizaemon 江田儀左衛門
- 3rd generation: Miyake Shūi 三宅集意
- 4th generation: Kurimoto Hanzō 栗本半蔵
- 5th generation: Sanno Bangorō Takamitsu 三野伴五郎高満
- 6th generation: Toyota Nakazaemon 豊田仲左衛門
- 7th generation: Toyota Chikazaemon 豊田近左衛門
- 8th generation: Tsumaki Junjirō Motoaya 妻木順次郎元賁
- 9th generation: Tsumaki Nobuhira 妻木信平
- 10th generation: Tsumaki Heinojō Motoshige 妻木平之丞元茂
- 11th generation: Tsumaki Ataka Motonari (Gensei) 妻木恰元成
- 12th generation: Tsumaki Kōtarō Motoatsu (Genkō) 妻木興太郎右元厚
- 13th generation: Tsumaki Yoshio Gensei 妻木義雄元誠
- 14th generation: Tsumaki Seirin Motonobu (Genshin) 妻木正麟元信

======Current lineages======

Following the death of Tsumaki 'Genshin' on June 4, 2019, Tsumaki Tasuo 'Gentatsu', Tsumaki Seirin's second son, became the next representative ("daihyō") of Tamiya-ryū, and his ancestry is officially recognized and registered with Nihon Kobudō Kyōkai and Nihon Kobudō Shinkōkai. Tsumaki Tasuo 'Gentatsu' was born in Odawara on August 1, 1946, he was taught by his father, Tsumaki Genshin, from about 12 years old. As he, Tsumaki Tasuo 'Gentatsu', inherited the line, he renamed it to Tamiya-ryu Iaijutsu. And he also became the director of Seirinkan.

Tsumaki Seirin's eldest son, Tsumaki Kazuo 'Genwa', split up from his brother and now runs his own organization, the Tamiya-ryū Genwakai. The American and Canadian branches of Tamiya-ryū are affiliated with the Genwakai. As of 2026, Abe Genkei is the current director at Ota Kyojo Sanno Senior Citizens Center, Elementary Shinagawa School, Shinagawa Ward - Yamanaka Elementary School.

And there is another lineage that follows the steps of Fukui Seiichi (1924-2016), an elderly disciple of Tsumaki Seirin. They identify themselves as Odawara Tamiya-ryū and the European branch of Tamiya-ryū is affiliated with this lineage. The current leader is Katsumata Ken'ichi.

== Techniques ==
Currently, Tamiya-ryū has 11 techniques in its first set (Omote no maki) and 14 in the second and last set (Koran no maki). Also, there are 10 paired techniques, called as Tachitai.

Tsumaki Seirin also added kenbu (martial dance with sword and fan) and shigin (Japanese poetry declamation) to the curriculum.

Odawara Tamiya-ryū have developed a new sets of techniques based on their research of Kubota Sugane's writings, introducing 11 techniques classified as Chūden (middle transmission) and 3 techniques classified as Ougi (supreme technique).
