= Tamiya =

Tamiya may refer to:

- Tamiya Corporation, a Japanese manufacturer of plastic model kits, radio-controlled cars and related products
- Tamiya-ryū (disambiguation), several iaijutsu ryūgi
- Tamiya connector, a type of DC power connector
- Ta’miya, the Egyptian term for Falafel

== Places ==
- Tamiya, Egypt, a town in Egypt

== People with the surname ==
- Hiroshi Tamiya (1903–1984), Japanese botanist
- Kenjiro Tamiya (1928–2010), Japanese baseball player
- Shunsaku Tamiya (1934–2025), Japanese business executive
- Tomoe Tamiyasu aka Tomoe Tamiya, Japanese voice actress

=== Fictional characters ===
- Toraichi Tamiya, a character from Ah! Megami-sama
