= Hasegawa Eishin-ryū =

Hasegawa Eishin-ryū (長谷川英信流)
- Ko-ryū

Foundation
- Founder: Hasegawa Chikaranosuke Eishin (長谷川 主税助 英信)
- Date founded: c.1716-1736
- Period founded: Late Muromachi period

Current information
- Current headmaster: None.

Arts taught
- Art: Description
- iaijutsu: Sword-drawing art
- kenjutsu: Sword art

Ancestor schools
- Shinmei Musō-ryū, Musō Jikiden-ryū (disputed).

Descendant schools
- Musō Jikiden Eishin-ryū, Musō Shinden-ryū.

Hasegawa Eishin-ryū (長谷川英信流) is a iaijutsu koryū founded by Hasegawa Chikaranosuke Eishin (or Hidenobu)(長谷川主税助英信) as a continuation of the teachings he received in Shinmei Musō-ryū. After the death of the eleventh headmaster, Ōguro Motoemon Kiyokatsu, the school split into two branches or ha. One branch, the Shimomura-ha (下村派), was renamed by its fourteenth headmaster Hosokawa Yoshimasa to Musō Shinden Eishin-ryū (無雙神傳英信流). After studying under Hosokawa, Nakayama Hakudō created his own school which he called Musō Shinden-ryū (夢想神伝流) in 1932. The other branch, the Tanimura-ha (谷村派), was renamed Musō Jikiden Eishin-ryū during the Taishō era (1912-1926), by its seventeenth headmaster, Ōe Masaji, who incorporated the Shimomura-ha techniques and rationalized the curriculum.

== Lineage ==
Here is the lineage of Hasegawa Eishin-ryū and its two branches up until Nakayama Hakudō and Ōe Masaji. Hayashi Masu no Jō Masanari, the twelfth headmaster as recognized by the Tanimura-ha, was a direct disciple of Matsuyoshi Teisuke Hisanari, the twelfth headmaster as recognized by the Shimomura-ha.

=== Jinsuke-Eishin mainline ===
1. Hayashizaki Jinsuke Shigenobu
2. Tamiya Heibei Shigemasa
3. Nagano Muraku Nyūdō Kinrōsai
4. Momo Gumbei Mitsuhige
5. Arikawa Shōzaemon Munetsugu
6. Banno Dan'emon no Jō Nobusada
7. Hasegawa Chikaranosuke Eishin
8. Arai Seitetsu Kiyonobu
9. Hayashi Rokudayū Morimasa
10. Hayashi Yasudayū Seisho
11. Ōguro Motoemon Kiyokatsu

=== Shimomura-ha ===
12. Matsuyoshi Hachirō Hisamori
13. Yamakawa Kyūzō Yukimasa
14. Tsubouchi Seisuke Chōjun
15. Shimomura Moichi Sadamasa
16. Shimamura Uba-no-Jō Yasuhide
17. Hosokawa Yoshiba Yoshimasa
18. Nakayama Yūshin Hakudō

=== Tanimura-ha ===
12. Hayashi Masu no Jō Masanari
13. Yōda Yorikatsu
14. Hayashi Yadayū Masayori
15. Tanimura Kame no Jō Yorikatsu
16. Gotō Magobei Masasuke
17. Ōe Masaji
