= Tamiya-ryū =

Tamiya-ryū can refer to two different iaijutsu ryūgi:

- "Ta-miya"-ryū (田宮流), an iaijutsu koryū founded by Tamiya Heibei Norimasa (田宮平兵衞重正)
- "Tami-ya"-ryū (民弥流), an iaijutsu koryū founded by Tamiya Gon'emon Muneshige (民弥権右衛門宗重)
