= Shinken =

Japanese sword

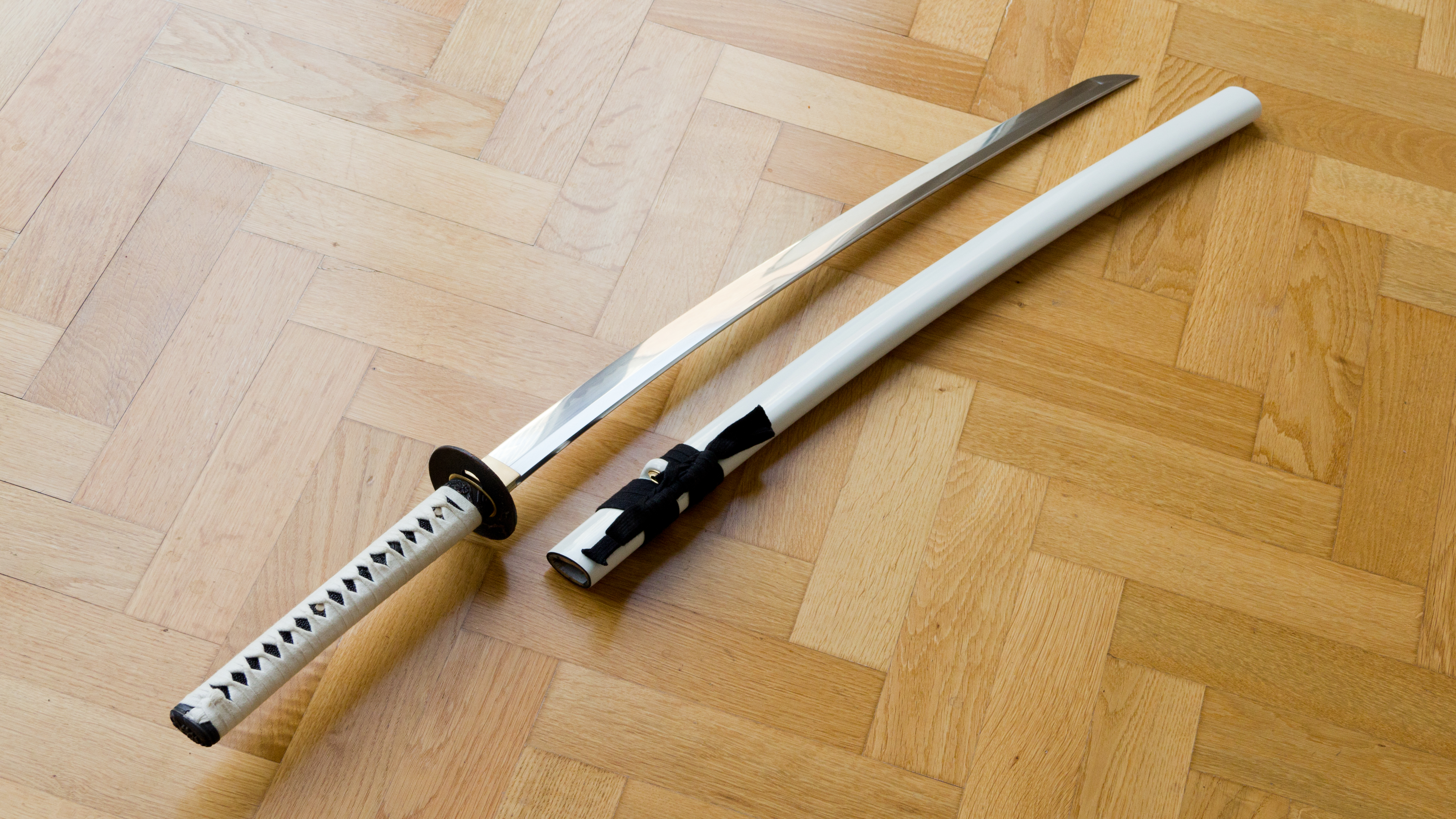
Shinken, a katana used in sword-related martial arts practice

Shinken (真剣; literally meaning "real sword") is a Japanese sword that has a forged and sharpened blade. The term shinken is often used in contrast with bokken (wooden sword), shinai (bamboo sword), and iaitō (unsharpened metal sword).

Shinken are often used in battōdō, iaidō, and iaijutsu (forms of combative sword-drawing), as well as tameshigiri (test-cutting through targets). In these arts, shinken may be used alongside unsharpened iaitō (居合刀) or mogitō (模擬刀), training swords manufactured for swordsmanship practice. Gendaitō (現代刀; modern-made swords) are handmade shinken by one of approximately 250 swordsmiths active in Japan at the moment, members of the Japanese Swordsmith Association. These swordsmiths are limited by Japanese law to producing no more than twenty-four swords a year each. This limit, along with highly specialized skills and the need for a great deal of manual labour, accounts for the high price that a Japanese-made shinken (Nihontō) can fetch—starting from about US$6,000 for the blade alone, and going many times higher for genuine antique (Mukansa or Ningen Kokuho are two famous types) blades.

There is also a large worldwide market for "shinken" made outside Japan. Many collectors consider these to be somewhat worthless as collectibles (since they are not Nihontō), but some martial artists continue to purchase and use them, because of their considerably lower price, ease of acquisition, and also to spare their valuable Nihontō from what some view as abuse. The vast majority of these are made in China, but there are custom smiths all over the world manufacturing swords in the Japanese style.

== See also ==
- Kenjutsu
- Battōdō
- Iaidō
- Iaijutsu
- Nihontō
