= Shindō Munen-ryū =

Japanese koryū martial art school

Shintō Munen-ryū (神道無念流)
- Ko-ryū

Foundation
- Founder: Fukui Hyōemon Yoshihira
- Date founded: Early 18th century
- Period founded: Edo period (1603–1868)

Current information
- Current headmaster: Branch-dependent

Arts taught
- Art: Description
- Kenjutsu: Sword Art
- Iaijutsu: Sword Drawing Art

Ancestor schools
- Shin Shinkage Ichiden-ryū

Descendant schools
- Funishin-ryū ・ Enshin-ryū ・ Fuso Nen-ryū ・ Shintō Muteki-ryū ・ Shin munen-ryū ・ Shinkan-ryū

Shindō Munen-ryū or Shintō Munen-ryū (神道無念流) is a Japanese koryū martial art school founded by Fukui Hyōemon Yoshihira (福井兵右衛門嘉平) in the early 18th century. The style rapidly gained popularity throughout Japan due to the efforts of Togasaki Kumataro, Okada Junmatsu, Saito Yakuro, and his sons Shintaro and Kannosuke.

== History ==
=== The Feudal Era of Japan ===
Fukui Hyōemon (1700–1782) was born in Shimano no Kuni (now Tochigi Prefecture) and learned Shin Shinkage Ichiden Ryu under Nonaka Gonnai received Menkyo Kaiden at a relatively young age.

Hyōemon, unsatisfied, traveled Japan taking part in shinken shobu (death matches) and honing his skills. He became so reputed that he was listed on Imperial and Tokugawa Bakufu records as one of the best swordsmen of his time. Hyoemon continued to travel through Japan until he encountered a small shrine in the Inazuma Mountains. There he found the Izuna-Gongen Shrine where he meditated and trained in isolation for 50 days. On the 50th night he achieved enlightenment. The resulting enlightenment was organized into a rather large syllabus of techniques later codified as "Shindō Munen-ryū".

Hyōemon thereafter traveled to Edo (present day Tokyo) where he opened a dojo in Yotsuya. There he trained a small number of dedicated students until his retirement. Hyōemon then passed the ryu onto his successor Togasaki Kumataro (2nd Generation). His grave can be found in present-day Saitama not too far from his protege's (Togasaki Kumataro).

The fourth successor of Shindō Munen-ryū, Saitō Yakuro Yoshimichi (斎藤弥九郎), established the dojo called Renpeikan (練兵館) in Edo.

Shindō Munen-ryū reached the pinnacle of its popularity towards the end of the Edo period (1603–1868). In this politically unstable time, Shindō Munen-ryū swordsmen participated in both the political and physical battles that came to define the Bakumatsu (1853–1868). It was not uncommon for Shindō Munen-ryū swordsmen of different or even the same dojo to engage each other in combat. Politically active members like Katsura Kogoro and Ito Hirobumi later took active leadership roles in the Meiji Government.

Today the Kanto ha Shindō Munen-ryū is one of the remaining branch of Shindō Munen-ryū. Negishi Shingorō (根岸信五郎) was the last headmaster who teaches Shindō Munen-ryū in the edo period. Shingorō received the licence Menkyo Kaiden in Edo Den from Saitō Shintaro. Shingoro, however felt the loss of idealism and passion that surrounded him during the closing days of the Tokugawa Bakufu. He acknowledged this fact by closing the Renpeikan's doors (officially ending the Edo Line) and opening the Yushinkan (有信館道場) Dojo and founding the Kanto Ha.

Prior to the fall of the Tokugawa Bakufu there were many Shindō Munen-ryū branches all over Japan. These branches operated independently of one another and prospered.

=== The Modern Era of Japan (1868–) ===
The dawn of the Meiji in 1868, however brought many new hardships with it and most of the branches Shindō Munen-ryū were forced to close their doors due to lack of patronage and the Meiji Sword Ban. Most surviving branches opened their doors again after the Meiji Sword Ban was lifted. Most, however lost the majority (if not all) of their kata as a result. In present-day branches like Choshu Han Den, Hachinohe Han Den, and Saitō Ha only practice a small portion of the Iaijutsu curriculum. Most of these Iaijutsu kata were reconstructed from written descriptions, and so may not be true to the original forms.

The style itself survived the Meiji period (1868–1912) completely intact however, largely due to the efforts of Negishi Shingorō (Edo Den 6th Generation/Creator of Kanto ha) who taught swordsmanship to the Tokyo Police Force. Shingorō's successor Nakayama Hakudō continued to preserve Shindō Munen-ryū throughout the Taisho (1912–1926) and Showa Periods (1926–1989) by producing some of the notable swordsmen in modern history. Examples are Nakayama Zendo, Hashimoto Toyo, Kiyoshi Nakakura, Haga Junichi, and Nakashima Gorozo.

The Nihon Kobudō Kyokai and Shinkyokai have recognized Kanto ha of Shindō Munen-ryū as the branch that preserves most of Shindō Munen-ryū (Kenjutsu, Iaijutsu, and other practices). The current headmaster of this branch is Ogawa Takeshi (10th Generation).

== Shindō Munen-ryū as taught by Iaido Sanshinkai ==
The Sanshinkai organization teaches a style of Iaijustu also called Shindō Munen-ryū. The style was propagated by Mitsuzuka Takeshi, a student of Nakayama Hakudo's school, from a makimono that described a set of tachiwaza (standing) kata for intermediate students to the Sanshinkai curriculum. It is often taught alongside Musō Shinden-ryū, but outside of Musō Shinden-ryū's core curriculum. The styles of Shindō Munen-ryū practice in the Sanshinkai and that of Japan's extent groups are not directly related, though the noto (placing the blade back into the scabbard) is similar.

== Edo Den/Kanto Ha lineage chart ==
Following lineage chart is recognized by Nihon Kobudo Kyokai and Shinkyokai.

1. Fukui Hyōemon Yoshihira (1700–1782): Ryuso.

2. Togasaki Kumataro Teruyoshi: Edo Den.

3. Okada Junmatsu Yoshitoshi (岡田十松): Edo Den; Okada established Gekikenkan(撃剣館) Dojo.

4. Saitō Yakuro Yoshimichi: Edo Den; Established the Renpeikan Dojo in Edo.

5. Saitō Shintaro: Edo Den.

6. Negishi Shingorō (1844–1913): Edo Den; Open the Yushinkan (有信館道場) Dojo.

7. Nakayama Hakudō (1872–1958): Kanto Ha.

8. Nakayama Zendo/Yoshimichi (Nakayama Hakudō's son): Kanto Ha.

9. Saeki Soichiro: Kanto Ha; Saeki trained over 10 years with Nakayama Hakudō, only to receive the Menkyo no Maki and Menkyo-Jo from Nakayama Zendo prior to his death.

10. Ogawa Takeshi: Kanto Ha.

== Branches from the Feudal Era of Japan ==
Examples of branches that were affected:

- Togasaki Ha Shindō Munen-ryū (Iaijutsu only).
- Okada Ha Shindō Munen-ryū (extinct).
- Suzuki Ha Shindō Munen-ryū (extinct).
- Mito Han Den Shindō Munen-ryū (extinct).
- Choshu Han Den Shindō Munen-ryū (practice fractured Iaijutsu curriculum only).
- Omura Han Den Shindō Munen-ryū (extinct).
- Hachinohe Han Den Shindō Munen-ryū (practice fractured Iaijutsu curriculum only).
- Saitō Ha Shindō Munen-ryū (practiced fractured Iaijutsu curriculum only).

== Iaijutsu Kata ==
1. Iwaname

2. Ukifune Gaeshi

3. Norashi Gaeshi

4. Utsuseme

5. Matsukaze

6. Zangetsu Hidari

7. Zangetsu Migi

8. Doto Gaeshi

9. Raito Gaeshi

10. Yoto

11. Yinto

12. Inazuma Gaeshi

== Notable Swordsmen in relation to Shindō Munen-ryū ==
- Terai Ichitarō: The first swordsman who taught Nakayama Hakudō the swordsmanship of Shindō Munen-ryū.
- Togasaki Kumataro: Edo Den; 2nd Generation Headmaster/founder of Togasaki ha.
- Okada Junmatsu: Edo Den; 3rd Generation Headmaster/founder of Okada ha Shintō Munen-ryū.
- Saitō Yakuro: (Aka. "Saito the Powerful") Edo Den; 4th Generation Headmaster Shintō Munen-ryū. One of the "Edo San Dai Kengo" or "The Three Great Swordsmen of Edo".
- Saitō Shintaro: Edo Den; 5th Generation Headmaster Shintō Munen-ryū.
- Saitō Kannosuke: (Aka. "Oni Kan" or "Demon Kannosuke) Edo Den; Menkyo, Founder of Saito ha Shintō Munen-ryū.
- Bushoji Yasuke (仏生寺弥助): (Aka. "The King of Hell") Edo Den; Menkyo, famous duelist and assassin for Choshu han Shintō Munen-ryū. Considered to be Saito Yakuro's best student.
- Kido Takayoshi: Edo Den; Menkyo/Shihan. Former Assistant Master of the Renpeikan, Samurai of Choshu han that was an instrumental activist against Tokugawa Bakafu.
- Takasugi Shinsaku: Edo Den; Mokuroku, Samurai of Choshu han Shintō Munen-ryū, activist against Tokugawa Bakafu.
- Nagakura Shinpachi: Okada ha Shintō Munen-ryū; Menkyo, Shinsengumi: 2nd Squad leader.
- Serizawa Kamo: Mito Han Den: Menkyo, Samurai of Mito Han and Commander of the Shinsengumi (before Kondo).
- Ito Kashitaro: Okada ha Shintō Munen-ryū; Menkyo, Shinsengumi.
- Negishi Shingorō: Samurai from Nagaoka Han. The last headmaster who teaches Shindō Munen-ryū in the edo period (1603–1868). Instructor at Tokyo Metropolitan Police Force -Keishi ryu. Edo Den/Kanto Ha; 6th Generation Headmaster of Shindō Munen-ryū.
- Nakayama Hakudō: Kanto Ha; 7th Generation Headmaster, Menkyo kaiden in Shindō Munen-ryū.
- Hashimoto Toyo: Kanto ha; Menkyo/Shihan, Muso Shinden Ryu: Menkyo Kaiden, All Japan Kendo Federation: Kendo/Iaido 10th Dan Hanshi (assistant master of Nakayama Hakudo's Yushinkan).
- Nakayama Zendo: Kanto ha; 8th Generation Headmaster, Menkyo Kaiden Shindō Munen-ryū; All Japan Kendo Federation: Kendo/Iaido 10th Dan Hanshi.

== Links ==
錬心館道場 Renshinkan Dojo
