= Musō Jikiden Eishin-ryū =

Japanese sword art school

Musō Jikiden Eishin-ryū (無双直伝英信流)
- Ko-ryū

Foundation
- Founder: Hayashizaki Jinsuke Minamoto no Shigenobu (林崎甚助源の重信) (1542-1621)
- Date founded: Early 1600
- Period founded: Azuchi-Momoyama period

Current information
- Current headmaster: Several individuals claim leadership (see below)

Arts taught
- Art: Description
- Iaidō / Iaijutsu: Sword-drawing art
- Kenjutsu: Sword art

Ancestor schools
- None

Descendant schools
- Hasegawa Eishin-ryū (長谷川英信流)

Musō Jikiden Eishin-ryū (無双直伝英信流 or 無雙直傳英信流) is a Japanese sword art school specializing in the iai technique. Often referred to simply as "Eishin-ryū," it claims an unbroken lineage dating back from the sixteenth century to the early 20th century. 17th undisputed headmaster, Oe Masaji, awarded at least 16 licenses of full transmission, resulting in the school fracturing into multiple legitimate branches.

The school takes its name from its seventh headmaster, Hasegawa Chikaranosuke Hidenobu (長谷川主税助英信), who had founded Hasegawa Eishin-ryū. ‘Musō Jikiden Eishin-ryū’ means ‘peerless, directly transmitted school of Eishin.’ ‘Eishin’ is an alternative pronunciation of ‘Hidenobu.’

== History ==
The founder of the earlier school Eishin-ryū was Hayashizaki Jinsuke Minamoto no Shigenobu (林崎甚助源の重信). Hayashizaki was born in Dewa Province, Ōshū (present-day Yamagata Prefecture). He lived c. 1546–1621 in what is present-day Kanagawa Prefecture. Many of the historical details of Hayashizaki's life are suspect, since, like most famous martial artists in Japan, his story has been widely fictionalized. He grew up during a time of constant warfare in Japan and was seemingly exposed to sword-fighting methods from an early age. According to legend, Hayashizaki's father was killed and to take revenge he began training in earnest. He went to the Hayashizaki Meijin shrine to pray for guidance and received divine inspiration for a new technique of drawing the sword and attacking in one movement. Legend says that he eventually defeated his father's killer.

Following this, Hayashizaki continued on his martial arts pilgrimage, training with renowned swordsmen and attracting students of his own (such as Tamiya Heibei, founder of Tamiya-ryū (Tsumaki)). Hayashizaki established his own style of swordsmanship, calling it Shinmei Musō-ryū (神明無双流).

Hayashizaki's art has had many names since it was established, such as Hayashizaki-ryū (林崎流) or Jūshin ryu (重信流). It is considered the foundation for many of the major styles of iai practised today, in particular Musō Jikiden Eishin-ryū and Musō Shinden-ryū.

The seventh generation sōke of Hayashizaki's school, Hasegawa Chikaranosuke Hidenobu (Eishin), was one of its most important headmasters. He had a major influence on the school. In particular, he adapted techniques originally developed for the tachi to use the contemporary katana. He devised many new techniques, some of which now form the Tatehiza no Bu (Chūden) set. Hasegawa's influence and adaptation led to the style being named Hasegawa Eishin-ryū. It was also referred to as Hasegawa-ryū or simply Eishin-ryū.

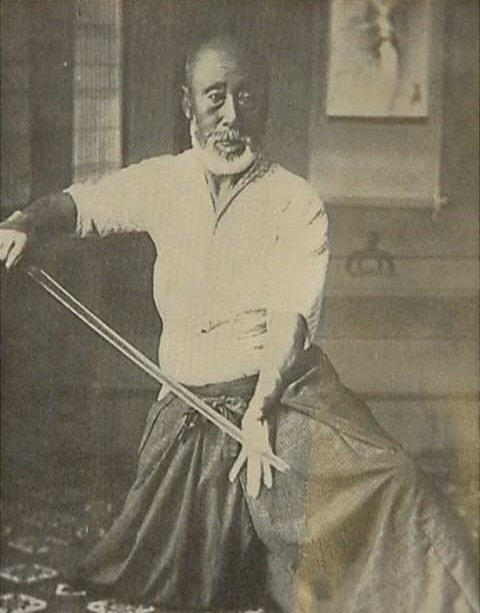
Ōe Masaji demonstrated sword technique. The line of Jinsuke-Eishin, called Tanimura-ha, was created by Gotō Magobei Masasuke (d. 1898) and Ōe Masaji Shikei (1852-1927). It was Ōe Masaji Shikei who began formally referring his iaido branch as the Musō Jikiden Eishin-ryū 無双直伝英信流 during the Taishō era (1912-1926).

Some regard Hasegawa as the primary founder of Eishin-ryū, which would make him the first generation sōke rather than the seventh, and make Shinmei Musō-ryū a parent school of Musō Jikiden Eishin-ryū.

The ninth generation sōke was Hayashi Rokudayū Morimasa. Hayashi introduced a set of techniques executed from the formal seated position seiza. These techniques are thought to have been developed by Hayashi's kenjutsu teacher, the Shinkage-ryū swordsman Ōmori Rokurōzaemon, and are said to be influenced by Ogasawara-ryū etiquette, hence starting from seiza. They were taught alongside Eishin-ryū as Ōmori-ryū. Hayashi was responsible for introducing the school to the Tosa Domain at the behest of the ruling Yamauchi family.

As the school took root in Tosa, it came to be referred to as Tosa Eishin-ryū. Eishin-ryū and Ōmori-ryū were taught to the Yamauchi family, with a few peculiarities (such as exaggerated leg movement to account for long hakama).

After the death of the 11th headmaster, Ōguro Motozaemon, the school split into two branches. They later became known as the Tanimura-ha and Shimomura-ha (after their respective 15th and 14th headmasters, Tanimura Kamenojō Takakatsu and Shimomura Shigeichi).

One of the most important sōke was the seventeenth, Ōe Masaji. Born in Asahi (nakasuka) Tosa in 1852, in his youth Ōe studied Kokuri-ryū and Oishi Shinkage-ryū (大石神影流)kenjutsu, along with Shimomura-ha Eishin-ryū (Musō Shinden Eishin-ryū:無雙神傳英信流). At the age of 15 he took part in the Battle of Toba–Fushimi, following which he studied Tanimura-ha Eishin-ryū under Gotō Magobei. He also studied Eishin-ryū bōjutsu under Itagaki Taisuke. Ōe inherited leadership of the Tanimura-ha, becoming its 17th headmaster. He combined the school's teachings with those of the Shimomura-ha and restructured its curriculum. Ōe reduced the number of waza from around 160, and reorganized them into the Seiza (Shoden), Tachihiza (Chūden), Okuiai (Okuden) and kumitachi waza sets practised today. Although he retained the original techniques, he changed the names of some waza to aid understanding. Ōe named the reorganised school Musō Jikiden Eishin-ryū, during the Taishō era (1912-1926). In 1900 he began teaching kendo and Eishin-ryū at the Kōchi branch of the Dai Nippon Butoku Kai and at local schools. In 1924 he became the second person (after Nakayama Hakudō) to be awarded hanshi in iaidō by the Dai Nippon Butoku Kai. Ōe died at Enokuchi on April 18, 1926. His many students went on to spread Musō Jikiden Eishin-ryū iai beyond Tosa and throughout Japan. 60 years after his death a memorial stone was raised to honour him on Mt Godaisan.

== Lineage ==
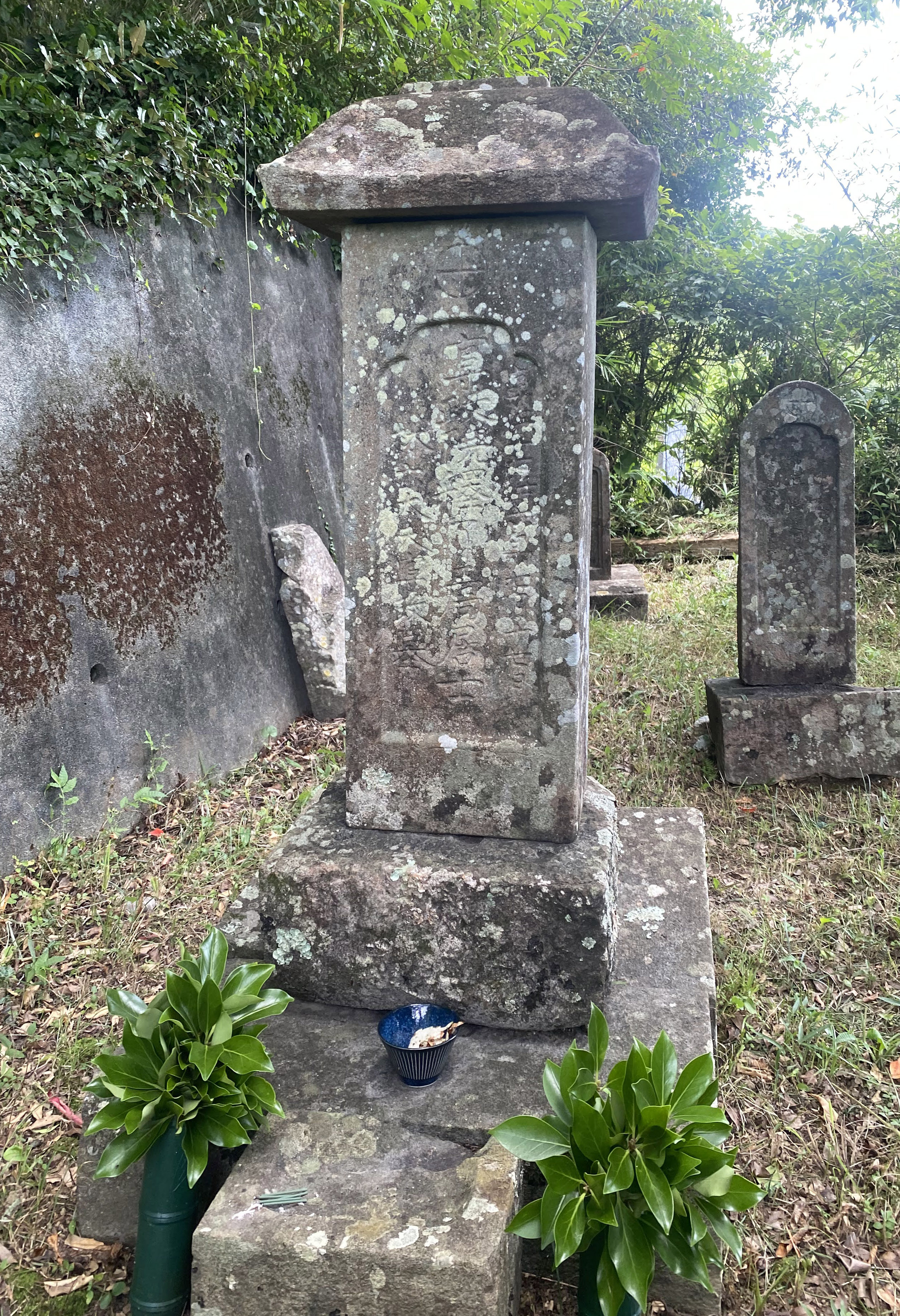
Gravestone of Hayashi Rokudayu Morimasa

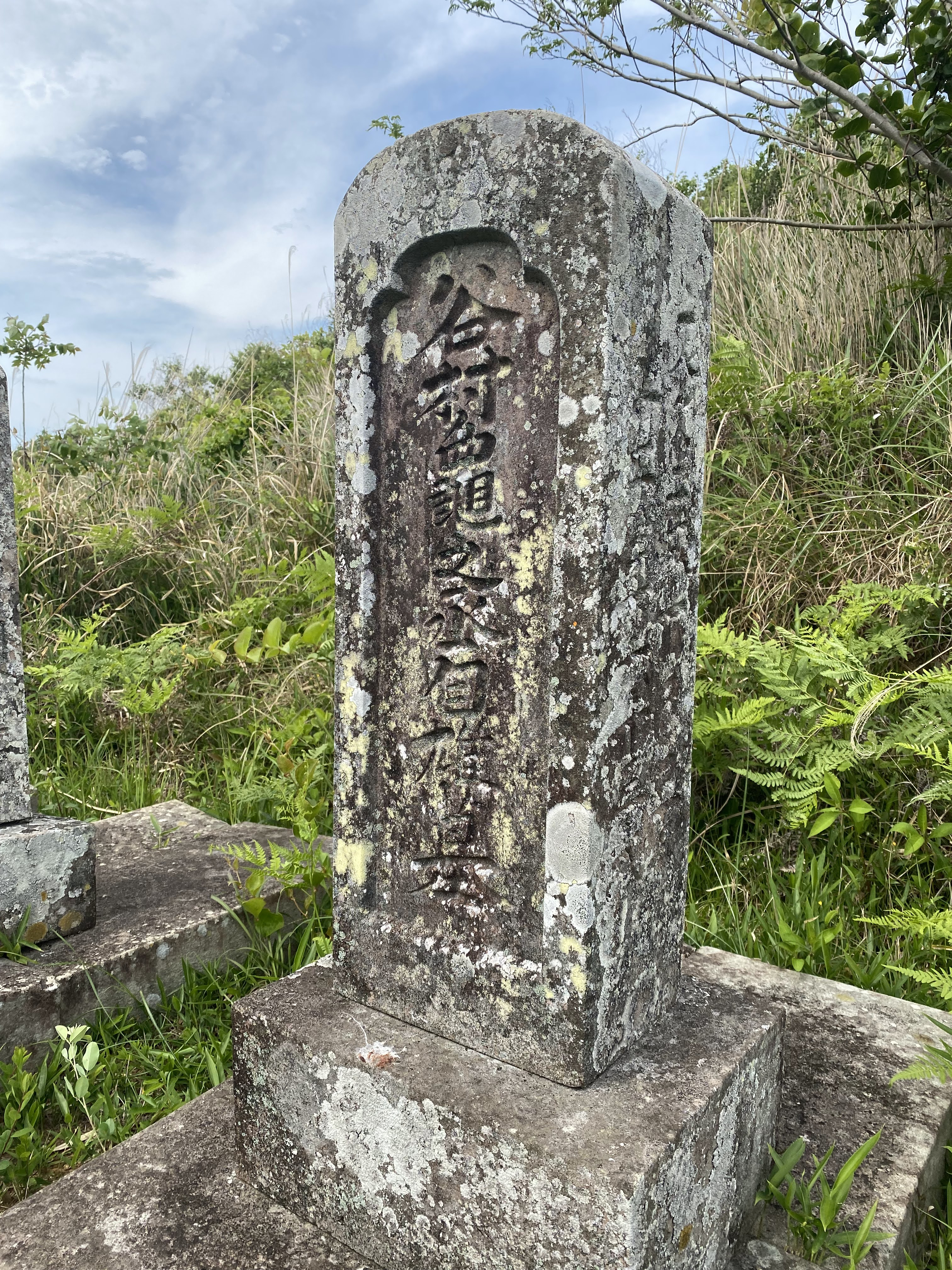
Gravestone of Tanimura Kamenojō Yorikatsu, 15th head of the Musō Jikiden Eishin-ryū

Eishin-ryū uses a system of indiscriminate transmission (完全相傳), allowing anyone in possession of full-transmission to award licenses to any number of his students. Therefore, it is possible that there were multiple, unlisted holders of menkyo kaiden, known in Eishin-ryū as Kongen no Maki (根元之巻), in any generation. Due in part to Ōe Masaji's more open and inclusive approach to teaching Eishin-ryū, the lineages of groups practicing the art are fairly diverse and complex.

=== Seitō (orthodox) lineage ===
- Hayashizaki Jinsuke Shigenobu, founder of Hayashizaki Shin Musō-ryū (林崎新夢想流)
- Tamiya Heibei Shigemasa, 2nd generation (田宮流)
- Nagano Muraku Nyūdō Kinrosai, 3rd generation (無楽流)
- Todo Gunbei Mitsushige, 4th generation
- Arikawa Seizaemon Munetsugu, 5th generation
- Banno Danemonnojō Nobusada, 6th generation
- Hasegawa Chikaranosuke Hidenobu (Eishin), 7th generation and founder of Hasegawa Eishin-ryū (長谷川英信流)
- Arai Seitetsu Kiyonobu, 8th generation
- Hayashi Rokudayū Morimasa, 9th generation
- Hayashi Yasudayū Masakusu, 10th generation
- Ōguro Gen-emon Kiyokatsu, 11th generation
- Hayashi Masu-no-jō Masanari, 12th generation
- Yoda Manzō Toshikatsu, 13th generation
- Hayashi Yadayū Masatoshi, 14th generation
- Tanimura Kame-no-jō Yorikatsu, 15th generation
- Gotō Magobei Masasuke (?-1897), 16th generation^{a}
- Ōe Masaji (1852–1927), 17th generation and founder of Musō Jikiden Eishin-ryū (無双直伝英信流 or 無雙直傳英信流).
  - Ōe Masaji's students established multiple lines of transmission. See Students of Ōe Masaji.
- Hokiyama Namio (1891–1935), 18th generation
- Fukui Harumasa (1884–1971), 19th generation
- Kōno Minoru Hyakuren (1899–1974), 20th generation
  - Kōno Minoru Hyakuren's students established multiple lines of transmission. See Students of Kōno Minoru Hyakuren.
- Fukui Torao (1915–2000), 21st generation
- Ikeda Takashi (1932–2019), 22nd generation
- Fukui Masato, 23rd generation

Following Kōno Hyakuren's death, the lineage of Eishin-ryu became contested again, with several individuals claiming to be the most senior representative. Who people consider sōke generally depends on the organization to which they belong. Some consider Musō Jikiden Eishin-ryū to no longer have a sōke.

In addition to groups claiming to continue the above lineage, there are some branches of Eishin-ryū that trace their lineage back to students of Ōe Masaji other than Hokiyama Namio, and which regard their leaders as the most senior member of the school.

There are a number of lines of transmission with direct links to Ōe Masaji but which do not make claims to hold leadership of Musō Jikiden Eishin-ryū.

=== Students of Ōe Masaji, further lineage ===
Ōe Masaji had many students who went on to spread Musō Jikiden Eishin-ryū throughout Japan. Some established their own branches (派, ha). Seventeen of Ōe's most influential students, some with the branches they established, are listed below. This list is not inclusive. Some of these students were presented with menkyo kaiden although the exact number Ōe awarded is unknown. Most Musō Jikiden Eishin-ryū taught today traces its lineage back to one or more of these men.

- Masaoka Katsutane (Κazumi, “Ikkan”)^{b} (1896–1973) (18th generation sōshihan, Masaoka-line)
  - Narise Sakahiro (19th generation)
    - Miura Takeyuki Hidefusa (20th generation)
      - Shimabukuro Masayuki Hidenobu (21st generation)
        - Carl E. Long (22nd generation)
- Nishikawa Baisui
- Kōda Morio
- Matsuda Eima
- Yamasaki Yasukichi
  - Yamasaki Masahiro
    - Yamasaki Takuji
- Nakanishi Iwaki
- Taoka Den
- Hokiyama Namio (1891–1935), 18th generation sōke
- Fukui Harumasa (1894–1971), 19th generation sōke
- Suzuki Yoshishige (Suzue Yoshishige)
- Mori Shigeki (1890–1988)
- Yamamoto Takuji (1886–1977)
- Takemura Shizuo
- Yamamoto Harusuke (1892–1978)
  - Yamashibu Yoshikazu (1922-1993)
    - Haruna Matsuo (1926-2002)
      - Oshita Masakazu
- Sakamoto Tosakai
- Yamauchi Toyotake (1905–1946) (18th generation soke, Yamauchi-ha)
  - Sendai Line
    - Uno Mataji
      - Sakagami Kaneo
        - Kawakubo Takaji
          - Sato Yoshio, Sato Masaki (21st generation)
- Yamauchi Toyotake(1905–1946)
  - Tokyo Line
    - Kono Kanemitsu (19th generation)
      - Onoe Masamitsu (20th generation)
- Komei Line
  - Sekiguchi Takaaki (Komei)
- Ueda Heitarō

=== Students of Kōno Minoru Hyakuren, further lineage ===
- Esaka Seigen (1926–2023) (Founder World MJER Iaido Federation)

== Techniques ==
The techniques of Musō Jikiden Eishin-ryū are broken up into sets based on the principal starting position of the waza and by skill level. The majority of the study is focused on these solo waza.

Musō Jikiden Eishin-ryū has 45 solo waza and 45 paired waza; some of these paired waza are rarely taught. Certain lines contain additional waza, grouped under Bangai no Bu.

=== Solo waza ===
Solo waza use a single long sword (katana).

==== Seiza no bu (Shoden) ====
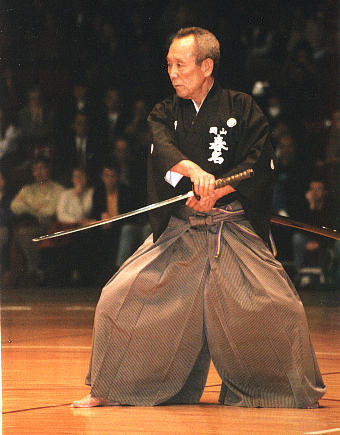
Seiza no Bu Ukenagashi nōto performed by Haruna Matsuo.

The word shoden (初伝) can be translated as ‘entry-transmission.’ This set of techniques was derived from Ōmori-ryū, and is still often referred to as “Ōmori-ryū.” It is the first set of techniques taught. Seiza no Bu waza are performed from seiza, a formal kneeling position, with the general exception of Oikaze, which often begins standing.

Seiza no bu (正座之部) contains the following techniques:

1. 前 Mae
2. 右 Migi
3. 左 Hidari
4. 後 Ushiro
5. 八重垣 Yaegaki
6. 受流 Ukenagashi
7. 介錯 Kaishaku
8. 附込 Tsukekomi
9. 月影 Tsukikage
10. 追風 Oikaze
11. 抜打 Nukiuchi

==== Tatehiza no bu (Chūden) ====
The word chūden (中伝) can be translated as ‘middle-transmission.’ This set was derived from techniques created by Hasegawa Eishin and is still commonly referred to as "Eishin-ryū." It is the second set of techniques taught. Tatehiza no bu waza are performed from tatehiza, a half-seated position, with the exception of Makkō.

Tatehiza no bu (立膝之部) contains the following techniques:

1. 横雲 Yokogumo
2. 虎一足 Toraissoku
3. 稲妻 Inazuma
4. 浮雲 Ukigumo
5. 颪 Oroshi
6. 岩波 Iwanami
7. 鱗返 Urokogaeshi
8. 波返 Namigaeshi
9. 瀧落 Takiotoshi
10. 真向 Makkō

==== Okuiai Iwaza no Bu (Okuden) ====
The word Okuden (奥伝) can be translated as ‘inner transmission,’ or ‘secret transmission.’ The Okuden sets contain advanced-level techniques. Okuiai Iwaza are performed from tatehiza. Okuiai Iwaza no Bu (奥居合居業之部) contains the following techniques:

1. 霞 Kasumi
2. 脛囲 Sunegakoi
3. 戸詰 Tozume
4. 戸脇 Towaki
5. 四方切 Shihōgiri
6. 棚下 Tanashita
7. 両詰 Ryōzume
8. 虎走 Torabashiri

==== Okuiai Tachiwaza no Bu (Okuden) ====
Okuiai Tachiwaza are performed from a standing position, with the exception of the three Itamagoi waza, which start from seiza. Okuiai Tachiwaza no Bu (奥居合立業之部) contains the following techniques:

1. 行連 Yukizure
2. 連達 Tsuredachi
3. 惣捲 Sō Makuri
4. 惣留 Sō Dome
5. 信夫 Shinobu
6. 行違 Yukichigai
7. 袖摺返 Sode Surigaeshi
8. 門入 Mon'iri
9. 壁添 Kabezoe
10. 受流 Ukenagashi
11. 暇乞其の一 Itomagoi Sono Ichi
12. 暇乞其の二 Itomagoi Sono Ni
13. 暇乞其の三 Itomagoi Sono San

==== Bangai no Bu (Okuden) ====
Bangai (番外, lit. ‘extra’) are extended tachiwaza. These waza are not koryū, but were created by Ōe Masamichi, along with the Katate Hayanuki exercise.

Bangai no bu (番外之部) contains the following waza, performed from a standing position.

1. 速浪 Hayanami
2. 雷電 Raiden
3. 迅雷 Jinrai

In addition to variations of Hayanami and Raiden, some lines contain additional Bangai waza.3

Komei-Juku practices the following set of five bangai kata in addition to the aforementioned three:

1. Mae
2. Aranami
3. Kesaguruma
4. Takiguruma
5. Tatsumaki

Kokusai Nippon Budo Kai formerly JKI (Masoka-Den) practices one additional bangai kata in addition to the aforementioned mentioned three: 4.鬼 Akuma Barai (shihogiri)

=== Paired Waza (Kumitachi) ===
Musō Jikiden Eishin-ryū's paired waza (kumitachi, 組太刀, Kenjutsu) are often taught only to advanced students after years of study. Some of these sets are rarely seen outside of Japan. Some ryuha have the first set (tachi uchi no kurai) as part of their yudansha curriculum. There is a high incidence of grappling, striking, and disarms in these paired sets. Some waza use both long (ōdachi) and short (kodachi) swords.

Some waza begin with swords drawn; others begin with swords sheathed and employ nukitsuke (drawing) techniques. Typically these forms are practiced using bokutō; however, it is also practiced at high levels with shinken. Each of these katachi (essence of kata) was created to promote practice of a key principle of Eishin Ryu under controlled yet reasonably realistic conditions.

==== Tachi Uchi no Kurai ====
Tachi Uchi no Kurai (太刀打之位) is first kumitachi waza set in Eishin-ryū. Both practitioners use a single long sword. The techniques are performed from a standing position.

There are two versions of this set: the original set of 10 waza (Tachi Uchi no Kurai) and the revised set of 7 waza formulated by Ōe Masamichi (also known as Tachi Uchi no Kata). These two sets contain similar techniques.

===== Tachi Uchi no Kurai (Koryū) =====
This version of the set contains the following 10 techniques:

1. 出合 Deai
2. 附込 Tsukekomi
3. 請流 Ukenagashi
4. 請込 Ukekomi
5. 月影 Tsukikage
6. 水月刀 Suigetsutō
7. 絶妙剣 Zetsumyōken
8. 独妙剣 Dokumyōken
9. 心明剣 Shinmyōken
10. 打込 Uchikomi

===== Tachi Uchi no Kurai (Kata devised by Ōe Masaji) =====
This version of the set contains the following 7 techniques:

1. 出合 Deai
2. 拳取 Kobushitori
3. 絶妙剣 Zetsumyōken
4. 独妙剣 Dokumyōken
5. 鍔留 Tsubadome
6. 請流 Ukenagashi
7. 真方 Mappō

==== Tsume Ai no Kurai ====
Tsume Ai no Kurai (詰合之位) is the second kumitachi waza set in Eishin-ryū. Both practitioners use a single long sword. The set includes the following techniques, performed from tatehiza and standing positions:

1. 発早 Hassō
2. 拳取 Kobushitori
3. 波返 Namigaeshi
4. 八重垣 Yaegaki
5. 鱗返 Urokogaeshi
6. 位弛 Kurai Yurumi
7. 燕返 Tsubame Gaeshi
8. 眼関落 Ganseki Otoshi
9. 水月刀 Suigetsutō
10. 霞剣 Kasumi Ken

The following kumitachi sets (Daishō Zume, Daishō Tachi Zume and Daikendori) are rare but are still taught in some dojo.

==== Daishō Zume ====
Daishō Zume (大小詰) is the third of the kumitachi sets. Shidachi wears an ōdachi and uchidachi wears a kodachi. The set contains the following techniques, which start from tatehiza and seiza.

1. 抱詰 Dakizume
2. 骨防 Koppō
3. 柄留 Tsukadome
4. 小手留 Kotedome
5. 胸捕 Munatori
6. 右伏 Migifuse
7. 左伏 Hidarifuse
8. 山形詰 Yamagatazume

==== Daishō Tachi Zume ====
Daishō Tachi Zume (大小立詰) is the fourth of the kumitachi sets. Shidachi wears an ōdachi and uchidachi wears a kodachi. The set contains the following techniques, which start from a standing position.

1. 〆捕 Shimetori
2. 袖摺返 Sode Surigaeshi
3. 鍔打返 Tsuba Uchikaeshi
4. 骨防返 Koppōgaeshi
5. 蜻蛉返 Tonbōgaeshi
6. 乱曲 Rankyoku
7. 移り Utsuri

==== Daikentori ====
Daikentori (大剣取) is the fifth kumitachi set and contains ten waza. The first four waza are kodachi (shidachi) vs. ōdachi (uchidachi), while the next six are ōdachi vs. ōdachi.

1. 無剣 Muken
2. 水石 Suiseki
3. 外石 Gaiseki
4. 鉄石 Tesseki
5. 榮眼 Eigan
6. 榮月 Eigetsu
7. 山風 Yamakaze
8. 橇橋 Sorihashi
9. 雷電 Raiden
10. 水月 Suigetsu

=== Techniques added by Kōno Hyakuren ===
Kōno Hyakuren, the 20th sōke of Musō Jikiden Eishin-ryū, added two sets of additional waza, called Dai Nippon Battō Hō (大日本抜刀法). The Battō Hō are based on techniques from throughout the system, but are performed starting in a standing position. As these waza were added in the 20th century, they are not considered to be koryū.

Eishin-ryū lineages without a connection to Kōno Hyakuren do not generally practise these techniques. Therefore, these waza are only included in some lines of transmission.

==== Dai Nippon Battō Hō (大日本抜刀法), Kihon (基本) ====
1. 順刀其の一 Juntō Sono Ichi
2. 順刀其の二 Juntō Sono Ni
3. 追撃刀 Tsuigekitō
4. 斜刀 Shatō
5. 四方刀其の一 Shihōtō Sono Ichi
6. 四方刀其の二 Shihōtō Sono Ni
7. 斬突刀 Zantotsutō

==== Dai Nippon Battō Hō (大日本抜刀法), Oku (奥) ====
These waza begin using the Okuiai walking pattern.

1. 前敵逆刀 Zenteki Gyakutō
2. 多敵刀 Tatekitō
3. 後敵逆刀 Kōteki Gyakutō
4. 後敵抜打 Kōteki Nukiuchi

== Auxiliary arts ==
In his book Musō Jikiden Eishin-ryū Iai Heihō Chi no Maki, Masaoka Katsutane states that there were once two auxiliary arts practised alongside Tosa Eishin-ryū.

=== Itabashi-ryū Bojutsu ===
This subsumed art focused on the bō, or long staff. It featured 5 kata of bō vs. bō and 8 kata of bō vs. sword.

=== Natsubara-ryū Yawara ===
This subsumed art focused on grappling techniques in a variety of circumstances: standing, kneeling, from behind, etc. The school was divided into 6 sets with 63 kata. Natsubara-ryū seems to be no longer extant.

In addition to the bojutsu and yawara, Masaoka's book also makes mention of other techniques, such as torinawa (rope tying) and jōjutsu (short staff).

== Footnotes ==
- ^a Lineage from Hayashizaki Jinsuke to Gotō Magobei is taken from Mitani, p. 25–26.
- ^b Ikeda gives the pronunciation for Masaoka's name, 壹實, as "Katsutane," although it is often romanized as "Kazumi." "Ikkan" was Masaoka's nickname, derived from another pronunciation of the characters in his name.
