= Iaitō =

Japanese modern metal practice sword

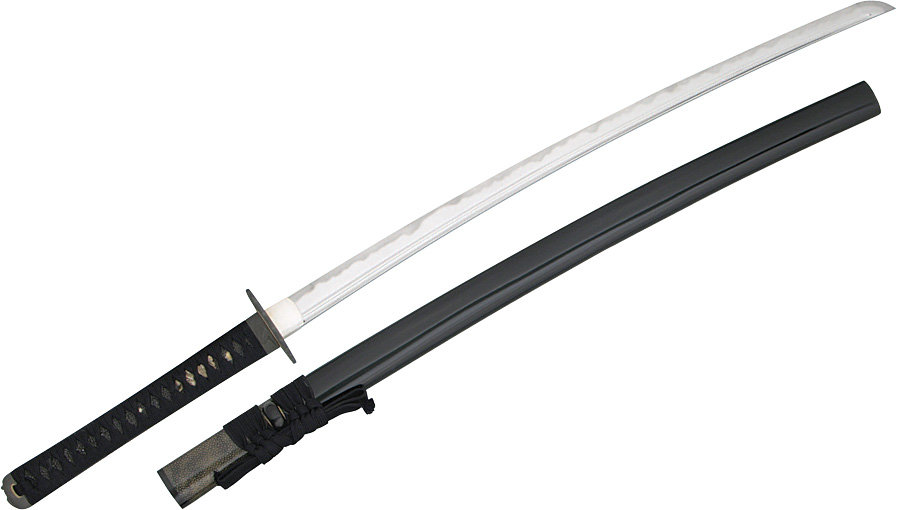
Iaitō

The iaitō (居合刀) is a modern metal practice sword, without a cutting edge, used primarily for practicing iaido, a form of Japanese swordsmanship.

== Other Japanese swords ==
A real (sharp) katana is called a shinken (真剣, lit., real sword). In contrast to shinken, iaitō have no cutting edge and are designed for iai/battō practice and are usually unsuited for sword-to-sword contact. These should not be confused with imitation swords primarily made for decorative reasons, which are generally unsafe for martial arts practice.

== Materials and manufacture ==
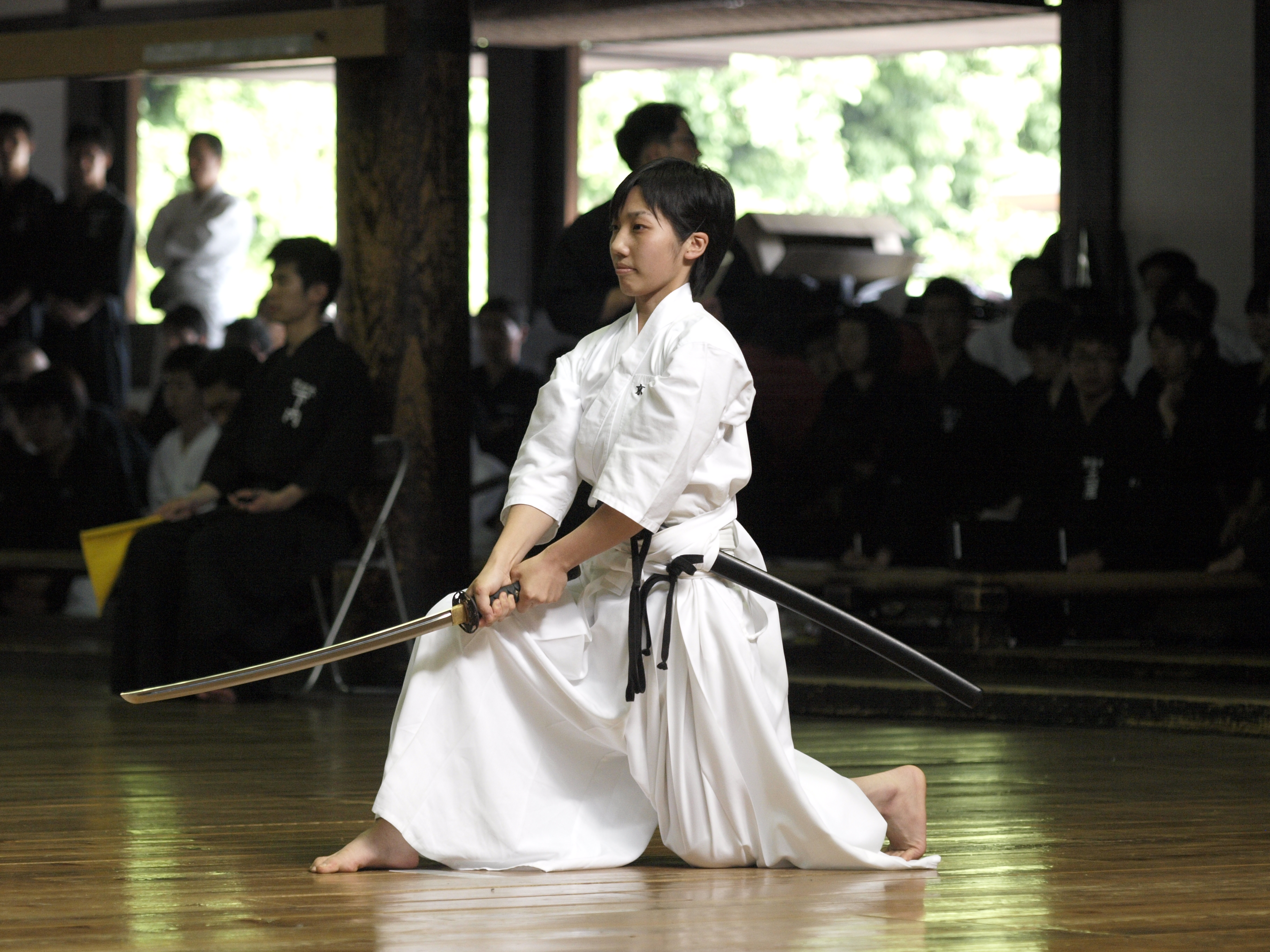
Japanese girl practicing iaido. The iaitō shown in this photograph was custom made according to the weight and size of the student. The blade is made of aluminum alloy, and for the student's safety, lacks a sharp edge.

Most iaitō are made of an aluminium-zinc alloy which is cheaper and lighter than steel. This use of alloy and a blunt edge also circumvents Japanese legal restrictions on the manufacture of swords made of ferrous metals. As such, Japanese-made iaitō are intended as practice weapons and are not suited for any type of contact. The best alloy blades are rather faithful reproductions of real swords with authentic weight and shape along with similarly high-quality finish and fittings. Iaitō may even have a mock hamon (刃文, lit., blade pattern, the temper line of a tempered steel blade). The average weight for a real katana (打刀) is generally 1,200 g (42 oz) without the scabbard while a typical alloy iaitō is roughly 820 g (29 oz). Some steel iaitō are also constructed and can weigh around 900–950 g (32–34 oz) for a 74 cm (29 in) blade.

Some imitation Japanese swords are made in countries other than Japan. They may even be made of folded steel, much like a real katana, but with a blunt edge. Such weapons would face the same use and ownership restrictions in Japan as genuine swords, and would not be considered iaitō in Japan.

The first iaitō were made after the Second World War to permit people without means to own a training sword for their practice of modern budō. Iaitō today are produced by specialized workshops without requiring any direct involvement of shinken swordsmiths.

Some dōjō in Japan recommend that only alloy blades be used for practicing iaidō until the practitioner's skill is consistent enough to safely use a sharp-edged sword. Some iaidō schools may require a practitioner to start with a shinken right away, while other schools prohibit the use of a shinken altogether.

The matching of iaitō length, weight, and balance to the practitioner's build and strength is of utmost importance to safely and correctly perform the iaidō forms (kata). Due to the repetition involved in the practicing of iaidō, they are often constructed with the balance point of the blade being set further from the blade's point (kissaki) and closer to the guard (tsuba) than other blades.

== Legislation ==
The Act for Controlling the Possession of Firearms or Swords and Other Such Weapons, established in Japan in 1958, forbids the possession, production, and importation of any sharpened (or sharpenable) sword. Very few exceptions to this rule exists, but, notably, traditional Japanese swordsmiths are permitted to produce a restricted number of blades over the course of the year. Japanese swordsmiths have a special status, and the weapons they make are considered works of art rather than weapons. (This also explains why nihontō exported outside Japan must go through a declassification process before their exportation.)

== See also ==
- Battōjutsu
- Bokken
- Iaido
- Katana
- Kenjutsu
