= Kiyoshi Nakakura =

Kiyoshi Nakakura (中倉 清, Nakakura Kiyoshi; 1910–2000) was a Japanese practitioner of kendo, iaido and aikido.

Nakakura was originally the top kendo student of Nakayama Hakudō. When Nakayama was asked to send a representative of kendo to Morihei Ueshiba's aikido dojo, he appointed Nakakura to the role. Nakakura married Ueshiba's daughter Matsuko and was legally adopted into the Ueshiba family, taking the name Morihiro Ueshiba.

Nakakura was impressed with Ueshiba's martial skills (particularly after his adopted father was able to fend off a simultaneous attack from both Nakakura and the fencing expert Junichi Haga), but disagreed with Ueshiba's Oomoto-kyo beliefs and left the family after a few years. His role as heir to Ueshiba's art was taken by Ueshiba's birth son, Kisshomaru.

Nakakura continued to train in kendo and iaido throughout his life, achieving 9th dan in both.
