= Iaido =

Japanese martial art

Iaidō 居合道 いあいどう
- Focus: Weaponry
- Hardness: Forms competitions only.
- Country of origin: Japan
- Parenthood: Iaijutsu
- Olympic sport: No

Iaidō (居合道), abbreviated iai (居合), is a Japanese martial art that emphasizes being aware and capable of quickly drawing the sword and responding to sudden attacks.

Iaido consists of four main components: the smooth, controlled movements of drawing the sword from its scabbard (or saya), striking or cutting an opponent, shaking blood from the blade, and replacing the sword in the scabbard. While beginning practitioners of iaido may start learning with a wooden sword (bokutō 木刀) depending on the teaching style of a particular instructor, most of the practitioners use a blunt-edged sword called an iaitō or mogitō. Few, more experienced, iaido practitioners use a sharp-edged sword (shinken).

Practitioners of iaido are called iaidoka.

== Origins of the name ==
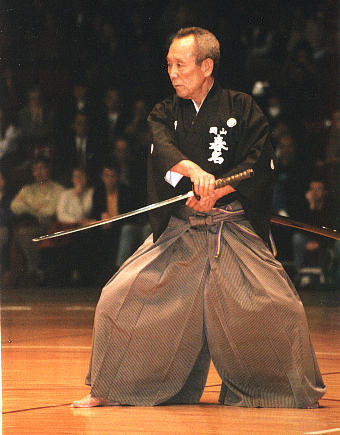
Haruna Matsuo sensei (1925–2002) demonstrating Muso Jikiden Eishin Ryu kata Ukenagashi

The term "iaido" appears in 1932 and consists of the kanji 居 (i), 合 (ai), and 道 (dō). The origin of the first two characters, iai (居合), is believed to come from saying Tsune ni ite, kyū ni awasu (常に居て、急に合わす), which can be roughly translated as "being constantly (prepared), match/meet (the opposition) immediately". Thus the primary emphasis in 'iai' is on the psychological state of being present (居). The secondary emphasis is on drawing the sword and responding by harmonising with a sudden attack as quickly as possible (合).

The last character, 道, is generally translated into English as the way or path. The term "iaido" approximately translates into English as "the way of mental presence and immediate reaction", and was popularized by Nakayama Hakudo.

The term emerged from iaijutsu (lit. "the art of mental presence and immediate reaction") and the general trend to replace the suffix -jutsu (術) ("the art of") with -dō (道) in Japanese martial arts in order to emphasize the philosophical or spiritual aspects of the practice.

== Purpose ==
Iaido encompasses hundreds of styles of swordsmanship, all of which subscribe to non-combative aims and purposes. Iaido is an intrinsic form of Japanese modern budo.

Iaido reflects the moral principles of the classical warrior and aims to cultivate a spiritually balanced individual characterized by intellect, sensitivity, and resolute will. The practice is primarily performed solo in the form of kata, which involve executing a variety of techniques against one or more imaginary opponents. Each kata begins and ends with the sword sheathed. Regardless of the specific technique used, imagination and concentration are essential to preserve the sense of a real combat situation and to keep the kata engaging. Iaidoka are often encouraged to practice kendo in order to maintain a combative spirit. It is common for high-ranking kendoka (practitioners of kendo) to also hold high rank in iaido, and vice versa.

To perform the kata appropriately, iaidoka likewise learn carriage, development, grip and swing. At times iaidoka will practice complementary katas from kendo or kenjutsu. Unlike kendo, iaido practice never involves sparring.

== Moral and religious influences ==
The metaphysical aspects of iaido have been influenced by several philosophical and religious currents. Iaido blends the ethics of Confucianism, methods of Zen, philosophical Taoism, the purifying rites of Shinto and aspects of bushido.

== Tōhō-gata techniques ==
A set of five koryu iaido forms:

1. Mae-giri from Musō Jikiden Eishin-ryū School
2. Zengo-giri from Mugai-ryū School
3. Kiri-age from Shindō Munen-ryū School
4. Shihō-giri from Suiō-ryū School
5. Kissaki-gaeshi from Hōki-ryū School

== Seitei-gata techniques ==
The 12 official kata currently recognised by the All Japan Kendo Federation are (in Romanised form):

1. Ippon me – Mae – Front
2. Nihon me – Ushiro – Back
3. Sanbon me – Ukenagashi – Receive, Parry and Cut
4. Yonhon me – Tsuka Ate – Striking With the Hilt
5. Gohon me – Kesagiri – Diagonal Cut
6. Roppon me – Morotezuki – Two Handed Thrust
7. Nanahon me – Sanpogiri – Three Direction Cutting
8. Happon me – Ganmen Ate – Hit to the Face
9. Kyuhon me – Soetezuki – Joined Hand Thrust
10. Juppon me – Shihogiri – Four Direction Cutting
11. Ju Ippon me – Sougiri – Complete Cuts
12. Ju Nihon me – Nukiuchi – Sudden Draw

Because iaido is practiced with a weapon, it is almost entirely practiced using solitary forms, or kata performed against one or more imaginary opponents. Multiple-person kata exist in some schools of iaido; for safety, iaidoka usually use bokken for such kata practice. Iaido does include competition in the form of kata, but does not use sparring of any kind. Because of this non-fighting practice, and iaido's emphasis on precise, controlled, fluid motion, it is sometimes referred to as "moving Zen." Most of the styles and schools do not practice tameshigiri, cutting techniques.

A part of iaido is nukitsuke. This is a quick draw of the sword, accomplished by simultaneously drawing the sword from the saya and also moving the saya back in saya-biki.

== History ==
Iaido started in the mid-1500s. Hayashizaki Jinsuke Shigenobu (1542–1621) is generally acknowledged as the organizer of Iaido. There were many different Koryu (customary schools), however just a few remain practiced today. Just about every one of them additionally concentrate on more seasoned school created amid 16-seventeenth century, in the same way as Muso-Shinden-ryu, Hoki-ryu, Muso-Jikiden-Eishin-ryu, Shinto-Munen-ryu, Tamiya-ryu, Yagyu-Shinkage-ryu, Mugai-ryu, Sekiguchi-ryu, et cetera.

After the collapse of the Japanese feudal system in 1868, the founders of the modern disciplines borrowed from the theory and the practice of classical disciplines as they had studied or practiced. The founding in 1895 of the Dai Nippon Butoku Kai (DNBK) 大日本武徳会 (lit. "Greater Japan Martial Virtue Society") in Kyoto, Japan. was also an important contribution to the development of modern Japanese swordsmanship. In 1932 DNBK officially approved and recognized the Japanese discipline, iaido; this year was the first time the term iaido appeared in Japan. After this initiative the modern forms of swordsmanship is organised in several iaido organisations. During the post-war occupation of Japan, the Dai Nippon Butoku Kai and its affiliates were disbanded by the Allies of World War II in the period 1945–1950. However, in 1950, the Dai Nippon Butoku Kai was reestablished and the practice of the Japanese martial disciplines began again.

The Zen Nippon Iaido Renmei, All Japan Iaido Federation (全日本居合道連盟, Zen Nippon Iaido Renmei) (ZNIR) was founded in 1948.

In 1952, the Kokusai Budoin, International Martial Arts Federation (国際武道院・国際武道連盟, Kokusai Budoin Kokusai Budo Renmei) (IMAF) was founded in Tokyo, Japan. IMAF is a Japanese organization promoting international Budō, and has seven divisions representing the various Japanese martial arts, including iaido.

Also in 1952, the All Japan Kendo Federation (ZNKR) was founded.

Upon formation of various organizations overseeing martial arts, a problem of commonality appeared. Since members of the organization were drawn from various backgrounds, and had experience practicing different schools of iaido, there arose a need for a common set of kata, that would be known by all members of organization, and that could be used for fair grading of practitioner's skill. Two of the largest Japanese organizations, All Japan Kendo Federation (ZNKR) and All Japan Iaido Federation (ZNIR), each created their own representative set of kata for this purpose.

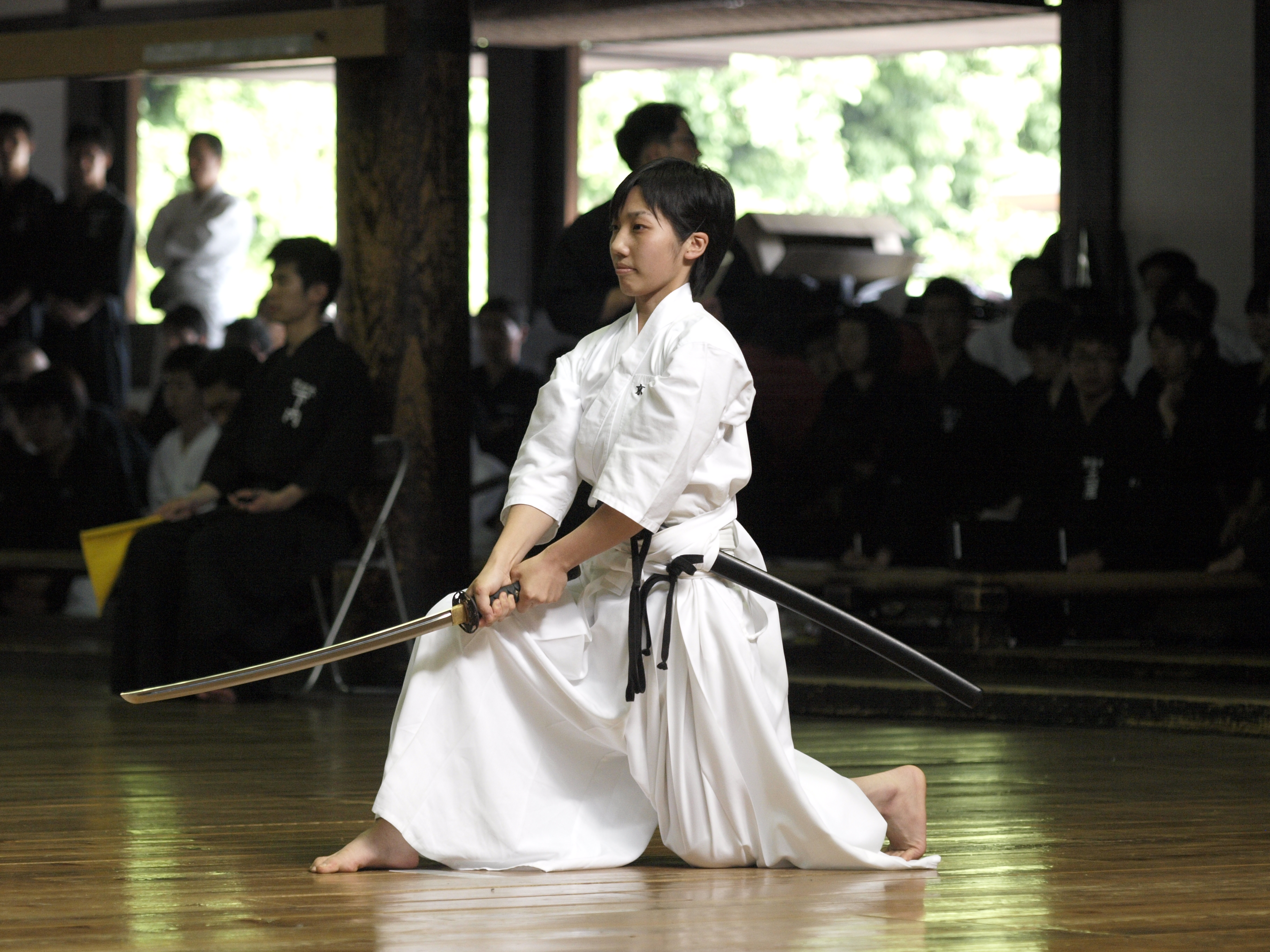
Japanese girl practicing iaido with a custom-made student's katana or iaitō. In modern Japan, iaido is seen as one of the traditional martial arts and it can be practiced by both genders.

== Kata under the respective iaido organizations ==
=== Tōhō Iaido ===
The All Japan Iaido Federation (ZNIR, Zen Nihon Iaido Renmei, founded 1948) has a set of five koryu iaido forms, called Tōhō, contributed from the five major schools whose teachers were involved in the creation of the organization.

- Musō Jikiden Eishin-ryū School founded during the late Muromachi period (c. 1590). ('Mae-giri')
- Mugai-ryū School founded in 1695. ('Zengo-giri')
- Shindō Munen-ryū School founded in the early 1700s. ('Kiri-age')
- Suiō-ryū School founded during the late Sengoku period (c. 1600). ('Shihō-giri')
- Hōki-ryū School founded during the late Muromachi period (c. 1590). ('Kissaki-gaeshi')

=== Seitei Iaido ===
Seitei or Zen Nippon Kendo Renmei Iaido (制定) are technical forms based on seitei-gata, or standard forms of sword-drawing techniques, created by the Zen Nihon Kendo Renmei (All Japan Kendo Federation). This standard set of iaido kata was created in 1969 by a committee formed by the All Japan Kendo Federation (AJKF, Zen Nippon Kendo Renmei or ZNKR). The twelve Seitei iaido forms (seitei-gata) are standardised for the tuition, promotion and propagation of iaido at the iaido clubs, that are members of the regional Kendo federations. All dojos, that are members of the regional Kendo federations teach this set. Since member federations of International Kendo Federation (FIK) uses seitei gata as a standard for their iaido exams and shiai, seitei iaido has become the most widely practised form of iaido in Japan and the rest of the world.

=== Suiō-ryū Iai Kenpō ===
Suiō-ryū has 9 standing kata and 9 counters to those kata.

Tachi Iai

1. Matsu Kaze (Pine Tree Wind) 2. Yoseru Nami (Approaching Wave) 3. Nami Gaesh (Returning Wave) 4. Sekka (Fire/Stone) 5. Koryû (Flowing Tiger) 6. Saza Nami (Calm Wave) 7. Ko Ran (Wild Tiger) 8. Uki Bune (Floating Boat) 9. Shin Ken (Heart/Mind Sword)

Tachi Iai Kage (Counters)

1. Fûtaku (Make sound) 2. Ryûyô (Willow Leaf) 3. Koyôhen (Dead Leaf Changing) 4. Nyoden (Female Lightening) 5. Koryûhen (Tiger Attack Changing) 6. Rengetsu (Water Lilies Moon) 7. Hagun (Breaking Militia) 8. Hyôyô (Rafting Leaves) 9. Asakaze (Morning Wind)

It also has five offensive and five defensive sitting kata.

Goyô no Kata

1. Ichi Monji (Straight Line) 2. Sei Getsu (Clear/True Moon) 3. Kasumi (Mist) 4. En Ren (Continuous Circle) 5. Iwa Kudaki (Rock Breaker)

Goin no Kata

1. Ryû Sui (Flowing Water) 2. En Kai (Swallow Turn/Counter) 3. Gyaku Fû (Reverse Wind) 4. Ura Kaze (Sea Breeze) 5. Sôro (Dew on the Grass)

==== Other organizations ====
Single-style federations usually do not have a standardized "grading" set of kata, and use kata from their koryu curriculum for grading and demonstrations.

== Schools ==
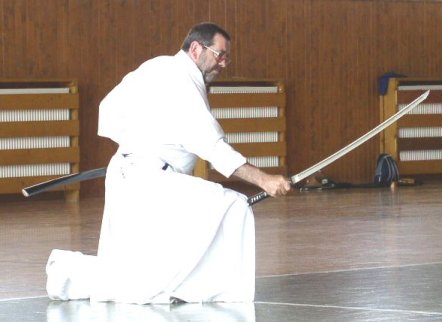
Iaido in the Czech Republic as demonstrated by Victor Cook Sensei, Kyoshi 7th Dan, of the UK

Many iaido organisations promote sword technique from the seiza (sitting position) and refer to their art as iaido. One of the popular versions of these is the Musō Shinden-ryū 夢想神伝流, an iaido system created by Nakayama Hakudō (1872–1958) in 1932. The Musō Shinden-ryū is an interpretation of one of the Jinsuke-Eishin lines, called Shimomura-ha.

The other line of Jinsuke-Eishin, called Tanimura-ha, was created by Gotō Magobei Masasuke (died 1898) and Ōe Masaji Shikei (1852–1927). It was Ōe Masaji Shikei who began formally referring to his iaido branch as the Musō Jikiden Eishin-ryū 無双直伝英信流 during the Taishō era (1912–1926).

Another popular iai school mostly found worldwide is Mugai ryu. Mugai-ryū (無外流) or "Outer Nothingness School" is a Japanese koryū martial art school founded by Tsuji Gettan Sukemochi (辻月丹資茂) on 23 June 1680. Its formal name is Mugai Shinden Kenpō (無外真伝剣法). Actually in the beginning, Mugai Ryu started as kenjutsu only school, but sent and recommended its disciples to learn another koryu named "Jikyo-ryu iaijutsu", and after Jikyo ryu vanished without any successor. It is renamed Mugai ryu iaijutsu/iaido up until today.

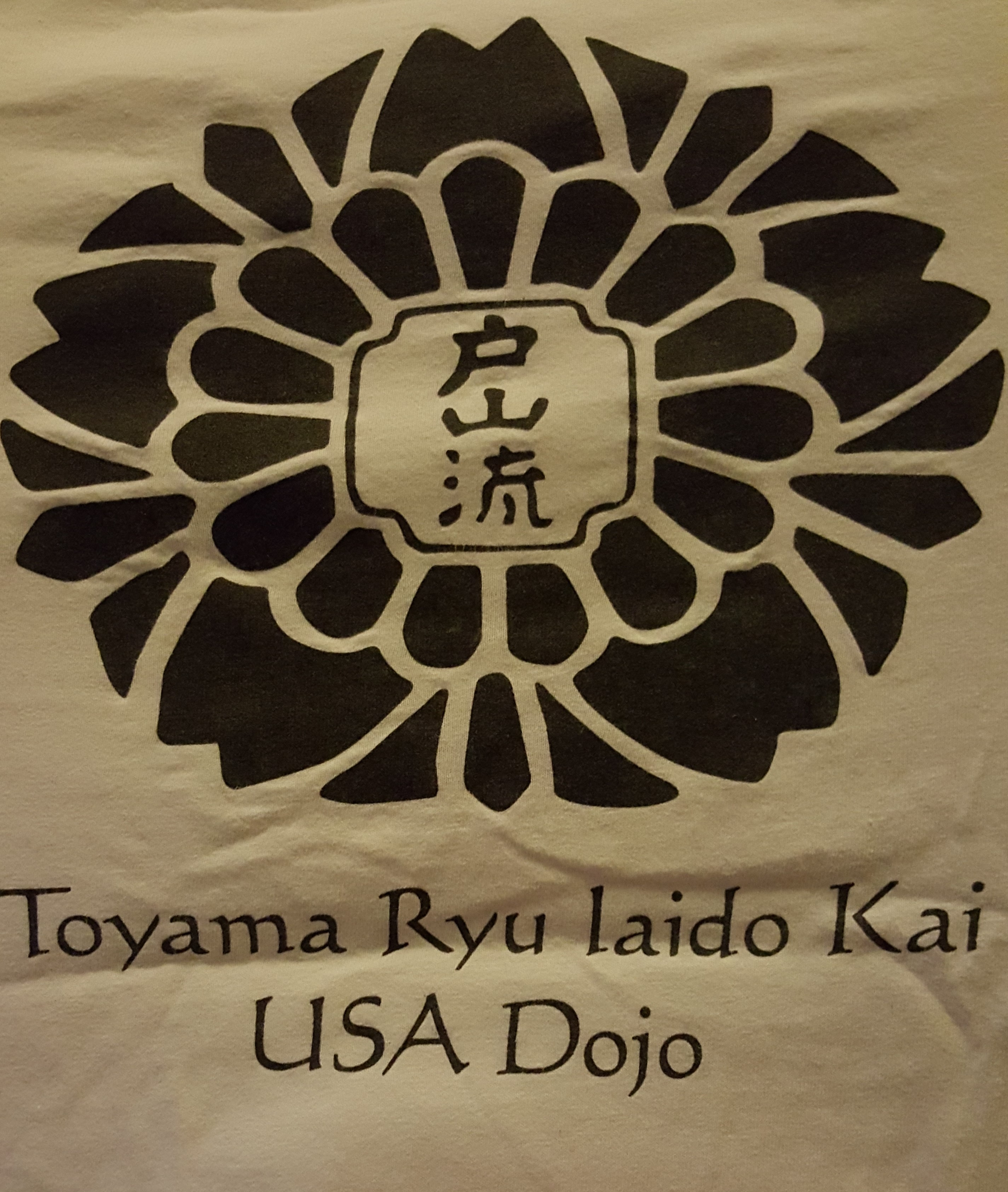
US dojo emblem

Another popular Iaido school is Toyama-ryū (戸山流), which was established in 1925 in Japan. It was created by the Japanese army during World War II to create a simplified form. This style emphasizes the most important aspects of drawing and cutting. After the war it became obsolete, but was revived after 1952.

== Ranks ==
Ranking in iaido depends on the school and/or the member federations to which a particular school belongs. Iaido as it is practiced by the International Kendo Federation (FIK) and All Japan Iaido Federation (ZNIR) uses the kyu-dan system, created in 1883.

Modern kendo is almost entirely governed by the FIK, including the ranking system. Iaido is commonly associated with either the FIK or the ZNIR, although there are many extant koryū which may potentially use the menkyo system of grading, or a different system entirely. Iaido as governed by the FIK establishes 10th dan as the maximum attainable rank, though there are no living 10th practitioners in Kendo, there still remains many in Iaido. While there are some living 9th dan practitioners of kendo, the All Japan Kendo Federation only currently awards up to 8th dan. Most other member federations of the FIK have followed suit.

== International Iaido Sport Competition ==
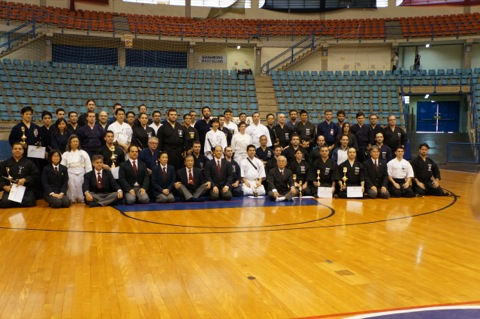
Medals and cups are a part of iaido in connection with sport games.

Iaido, in its modern form, is practiced as a competitive sport, separately regulated by the All Japan Kendo Federation and All Japan Iaidō Federations.

An iaido competition consists of two or more iaidoka performing their kata next to each other and simultaneously. The competitors will be judged by a panel of judges according to the standardized regulations.

The European Kendo Federation has arranged European iaido championships since 1993, and this competition continues to be held every year with a few exceptions.

== Organisations ==
Many national and regional organisations manage and promote iaido activities. The following is a list of international organisations which include iaido:

Dai Nippon Butoku Kai (DNBK), established in 1895 in Kyoto, approved and recognized the discipline iaido.

The International Martial Arts Federation (IMAF) was established in Kyoto in 1952 and is dedicated to the promotion and development of the martial arts worldwide, including iaido.

International Kendo Federation (FIK), established in 1970, an international organization for Kendo, Iaido and Jodo practitioners, which many national Kendo federations are a member of.

All Japan Iaido Federation (or Zen Nippon Iaido Renmei) (ZNIR) was established in 1954 "in accordance with the Japanese bushido spirit to pass on the time-honoured system of Kobudo Iaido".

The World Musō Jikiden Eishin-ryū Iaido Federation, established in Tokyo in 2011, is dedicated to ensuring the orthodox transmission of MJER Iaido to future generations worldwide, as well as promoting and preserving the development of other schools.

Zen Nihon Toyama Ryu Iaido Renmei (ZNTIR) established in Machida Japan after WW II was created as "Toyama-Ryu Shinko kai" established by Tokutomi Tasaburo and Nakamura Taizaburo who were Gunto Soho instructors at the Toyama Ryu Military Academy for the Japanese Imperial Army. Over time the "Toyama-Ryu Shinko-Kai" was renamed as Zen Nihon Toyama Ryu Iaido Renmei, and practice eight kata from a derivative of Gunto Soho.

Murayama City, the birthplace of iaido, operates a number of iaido experience and training programs. This includes training with some of the iaido masters and English-speaking teachers in Yamagata.

=== Ireland ===
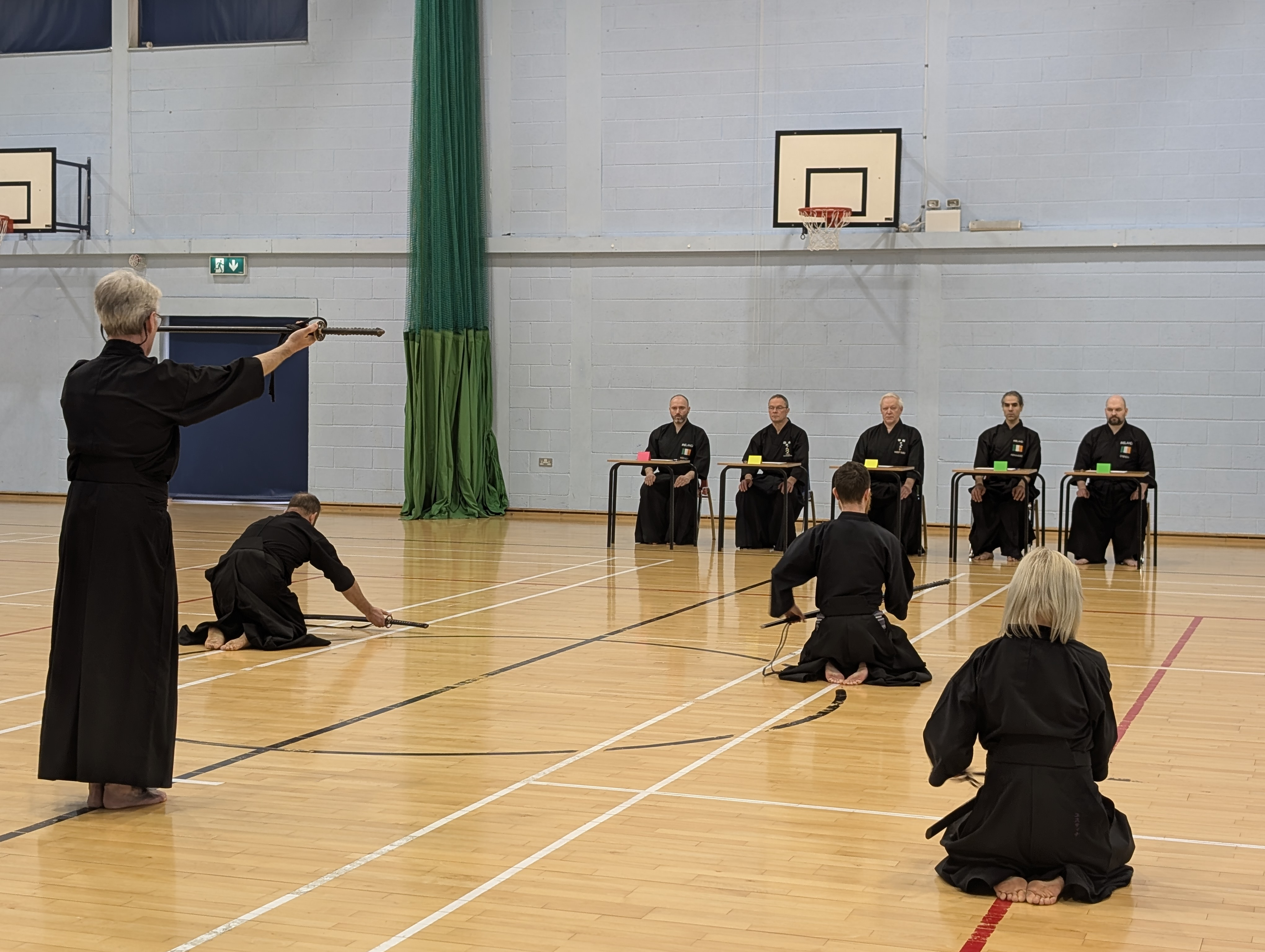
Ireland's First Shodan Iaido Grading in ZNKR Iaido

Iaido is part of Kendo na hÉireann, the Irish Kendo Federation, which supports Kendo, Iaido, and Jodo. Founded in 1998, the federation is affiliated with the Irish Martial Arts Commission (IMAC), the European Kendo Federation, and the International Kendo Federation, with dojos in counties such as Cavan, Cork, Dublin, and Galway. In July 2014, the federation held its first Iaido Kyu Grading, marking an important step in the growth of ZNKR (aka Seitei Iai) in Ireland, with five candidates participating. A decade later, in December 2024, Ireland's first Shodan (1st Dan) grading took place in Dublin.

Several other dojos across Ireland offer Iaido training:

- Kenseikai Ireland Iaido Dojo — a Dublin-based dojo practicing Musō Jikiden Eishin-ryū.
- Ojika NI Dojo is located in Belfast, Northern Ireland, this dojo practices modern Seitei Iaido for gradings and competitions, as well as the classical Muso Jikiden Eishin Ryu style.

== See also ==
- Battōjutsu
- Fast draw
- Iaijutsu
- Kendo
- Kenjutsu
- Samurai
- Zen Nippon Kendo Renmei Iaido
