= Nakayama Hakudō =

Japanese martial artist and swordsman

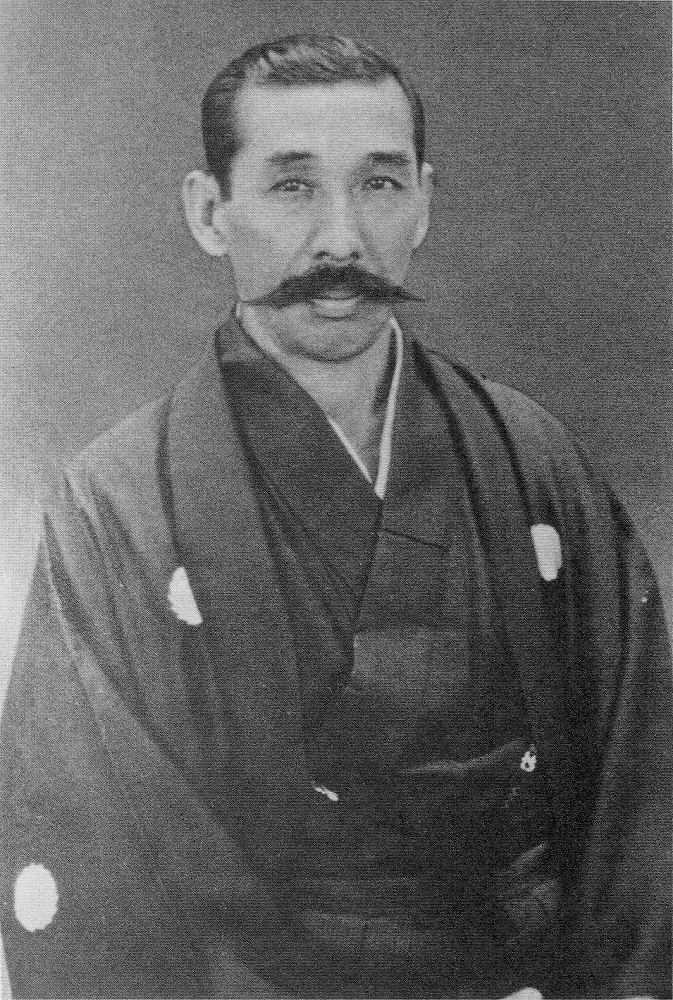
- Born: February 11, 1872; Kanazawa City, Ishikawa Prefecture, Japan
- Died: December 14, 1958 (aged 86)
- Occupation: Martial Artist

Nakayama Hakudō (中山 博道; February 11, 1872 - December 14, 1958), also known as Nakayama Hiromichi, was a Japanese martial artist and founder of the iaidō style Musō Shinden-ryū. He received hanshi (master instructor) ranks in kendō, iaidō, and jōdō from the All Japan Kendo Federation. In addition, he held an instructor's license in Shintō Musō-ryū and a Menkyo kaiden in Shindō Munen-ryū making him the 7th sōke of that system. Nakayama was also one of the masters of the Shimomura-ha Musō Shinden Eishin-ryū, iaijutsu.

== Biography ==
Nakayama was born in 1872 in Kanazawa City, Ishikawa Prefecture, Japan. He moved to Tokyo when he was 19 years old and entered the dōjō of Negishi Shingorō of the Shindō Munen-ryū. In time, Nakayama became a master of Shindō Munen-ryū kenjutsu.

He taught at the Yushinkan Dojo, near Koishikawa-Kōrakuen in Tokyo, and he trained many of the top swordsmen of his day. He was a personal friend of aikido founder Morihei Ueshiba, and he was instrumental in arranging the marriage between his student Kiyoshi Nakakura and Ueshiba's daughter, Matsuko. He also was the teacher of Ueshiba's student Minoru Mochizuki, developer of the Yoseikan dojo. Nakayama also taught kendo and Iaido to Gigō Funakoshi, third son of Shotokan karate founder Gichin Funakoshi, who gave his father's karate a more Japanese flavour by adding kendo and Iaido based training exercises and technical improvements based on his swordsmanship training.

By the mid-1920s, Nakayama was one of the most famous swordsmen in Japan, and as such, he was made a leader of the committee that drew up the sword curriculum for the Toyama Military Academy. Therefore, he is considered by many to be the father of Toyama swordsmanship. Nonetheless, Kimura Shoji wrote in 1926:

The ethics of swordsmanship, Mr. Nakayama wishes to clarify, is not in aggressive manslaughter. It lies primarily in psychic training. In the same manner in which the Yogis developed their physical inhibition to attain meditative states for higher psychical conditions, kendo trains the nervous system to respond, making awkward conscious efforts into reflex. The instrument, the sword, is necessary to give that serious frame of mind. What is more serious than life as forfeit for mistakes or inattention? The cold, mirror-like glimmer of the blade facing you, you cannot but be serious. The behavioristic school of psychology is well in accordance to this principle.

Nakayama was an active promoter of New Swords (e.g., modern swords made in the traditional fashion). Often, this involved cutting demonstrations. For example, on July 10, 1934, Nakayama publicly demonstrated the strength of New Swords by using one to cut an iron bar about the thickness of a man's finger. The bar had been wrapped in straw, and Nakayama cut it with a single stroke, without leaving a mark on either the table or the blade. The Japanese Sword Institute had forged the sword; the smiths were students of Kurishara Hikosaburo. Unfortunately, such high quality swords were too expensive for mass production. In 1941, New Swords typically cost ¥2,000-¥8,000 (US$1,000-$4,000).

At the end of World War II, Nakayama was quick to advise Japanese people to greet Allied troops with grace, saying samurai never mouthed what was finished. Said he:

In fencing we call this spirit 'ohen' or adapting one's self to the change. In other words, it is a condition where after realizing and acknowledging the natural tide of affairs, all past ambitions are given up and a state of nothingness is reached. This requires magnanimity of heart. It is the ultimate meaning of the art of fencing. We must greet the Allied Army with just such a spirit. Yesterday they were enemies but today they are no longer so. If we cannot think of them as being no longer enemies, then it cannot be said that we truly understand the spirit of bushido.

If there is the least feeling of ill-will harbored in our hearts and if we cannot take a broad outlook, it is bound to show in our faces and attitude, giving reason for others to think of us as cowardly. I believe that the greatness of a nation lies in its broadminded attitude.

Nakayama lived this advice himself, and as such, he was involved in the establishment of the postwar All Japan Kendo Federation and titled as Meijin by the International Martial Arts Federation (IMAF Japan).

Nakayama was also a poet and calligrapher. A sample scroll reads:

Flowers need water and shade
Bamboo needs the moon shade
Beautiful woman looks best through the shade of a screen

== Publications ==
- Nakayama, Hakudō (1924). Kendō Tebikisō.(剣道手引草).
