= Hōki-ryū =

Japanese koryū sword-fighting martial art

Hōki-ryū (伯耆流)
- Ko-ryū

Foundation
- Founder: Katayama Hisayasu (1575-1650)
- Date founded: 1596
- Period founded: Muromachi period

Current information
- Current headmaster: none

Arts taught
- Art: Description
- Iaidō / Iaijutsu: Sword-drawing art

Ancestor schools
- none

Descendant schools
- none

Hōki-ryū (伯耆流) is a Japanese koryū sword-fighting martial art founded in the late Muromachi period by Katayama Hōki-no-kami Fujiwara Hisayasu (片山伯耆守藤原久安) (1575–1650).

== History ==
Although often stated to be a student of Hayashizaki Jinsuke (林崎甚助), the ryū itself states that Katayama Hisayasu inherited eighteen secret sword techniques from his uncle Katayama Shōan. Additionally, Katayama Hisayasu was also said to have been the younger brother of Takenouchi Hisamori (竹内久盛), founder of Takenouchi-ryū (竹内流). In 1596, he traveled to Atago Shrine in Kyoto and for seven days and seven nights trained and prayed continuously. In a divine dream, Hisayasu was supposedly given insight and was said to have attained enlightenment to the mysteries of the art of iai. Using this insight and the teachings received from his uncle he formed his own tradition of swordsmanship.

In 1610, he was called to the Royal Palace to demonstrate before the emperor. He demonstrated Iso-no-nami, one of the teachings he received from his uncle, in front of the Emperor Go-Yōzei. For this, he was given the court rank of Jyu-Goi-Ge and made governor of Hōki province. In 1650, at the age of 76, Hisayasu died in Iwakuni, Yamaguchi Prefecture. The original name for Hisayasu's tradition was said to be Ikkan-ryū (一貫流) for a time, but was known within the Katayama family as Katayama-ryū (片山流). Katayama Hisayasu's teaching also became widely spread in Kumamoto and the name Hōki-ryū (伯耆流) and Katayama Hōki-ryū (片山伯耆流) became more widely known there and throughout the country. The present day the tradition is generally referred to as just Hōki-ryū.

The art had been handed down in the Katayama family (in Iwakuni) and the Hoshino family (in Kumamoto), however, the family of the last Katayama head was wiped out in World War II and that direct line, known as Katayama-ryū, is no longer extant. The Hoshino family in Kumamoto regularly maintained contact with the Katayama family and the majority of groups practicing Hōki-ryū today come from the Hoshino lineage. Today, the Hōki-ryū tradition is today in its 12th or 13th generation.

Using Iso-no-nami as a base, Hisayasu and later generations of the Katayama and Hoshino families developed and established over seventy sword forms, although many of these have been lost in most groups practicing Hōki-ryū today. Presently, fifteen basic forms form the basis of nearly all Hōki-ryū groups, with different groups having varying numbers of the remaining kata surviving . These fifteen forms are divided to two sets; six forms in Omote and nine forms in Chudan. Most forms are started from the seiza posture.

== Branches ==
Hōki-ryū has through history branched off and spawned derivatives. The majority of groups today come from the Hoshino family of Kumamoto. Today the art has large groups practicing in the Kyūshū, Hiroshima and Kansai areas, as well as smaller groups in other areas. Additional branches active today include Ono-ha Hōki-ryū and Kumagai-ha Hōki-ryū. Ono-ha Hōki-ryū was founded by Ono Kumao (himself of Hoshino lineage) and is today primarily practiced under the auspices of the All Japan Iaido Federation. Kumagai-ha Hōki-ryū is today only practiced in one dojo in northern Kumamoto Prefecture.

== Iai forms ==
=== Omote (initial set) ===
- Osae nuki. Thrust to an opponent to the left, with hand alongside the blade, in seiza posture.
- Kote giri. Thrust to an opponent to the left, with hand alongside the blade, in seiza posture.
- Kiri tsuke. Thrust to an opponent to the right, with hand alongside the blade, in seiza posture.
- Nuki dome. Block an attack from right, and cut an opponent.
- Tsuki dome. Deflect tsukidome, an attack from front, and cut an opponent.
- Shiho kanakiri. Cut three opponents, in seiza posture.

=== Chu-dan (middle level) ===
- Hiza zume. Nukitsuke to kesa and cut an opponent from front, in seiza posture.
- Mune no katana. Strike aside the attack of an enemy, and cut, in seiza posture.
- Okkake nuki. Nukitsuke to kesa and cut an opponent from front, in standing posture.
- Kaeri nuki. Nukitsuke to kesa and cut an opponent from rear, in standing posture.
- Issa soku. Jump-up and block ukenagashi from tate-hiza posture, and cut an opponent in the front standing and approaching.
- Mukou zume. Block ukenagashi from standing posture, and cut an opponent in the front.
- Naga rouka. Strike aside the attack of an enemy, and cut, from tate-hiza posture.
- Kissaki gaeshi. Block ukenagashi, strike a face of an opponent in the front and thrust.
- Shiho zume. Cut three opponents, in standing posture.
