= Musō Shinden-ryū =

Japanese style of sword-drawing art (iaido)

Musō Shinden-ryū (夢想神伝流)
- Date founded: 1932
- Founder: Nakayama Hakudō (中山 博道), 1869-1958.
- Current head: None
- Arts taught: Iaido
- Ancestor schools: Hasegawa Eishin-ryū (長谷川英信流)
- Descendant schools: None.

Musō Shinden-ryū (夢想神伝流) is a style of sword-drawing art (iaido) founded by Nakayama Hakudō (中山博道) in 1932. Nakayama Hakudō studied under Hosokawa Yoshimasa, a master of the Shimomura branch (下村派) of Hasegawa Eishin-ryū, and Morimoto Tokumi, a fellow student of Ōe Masaji of the Tanimura branch (谷村派). The name Musō Shinden-ryū most likely comes from the name given to the Shimomura branch by Hosokawa, Musō Shinden Eishin-ryū (無雙神傳英信流).

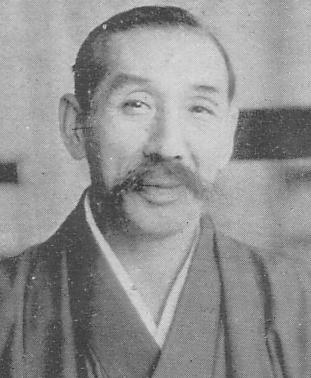
Nakayama Hakudō

== Particularities ==
The kata from Musō Shinden-ryū have a number of differences from the kata of its sister art, Musō Jikiden Eishin-ryū. Among the most visible are the manner in which the furikaburi (raising the sword overhead, sometimes called furikamuri) and the nōtō (sheathing) are done. Both arts also differ from many other iaijutsu schools in that the kiai is performed silently, without hassei (shouting).

=== Furikaburi ===
After striking with one hand, primarily on nukitsuke (cutting as one draws the sword out), the sword is brought to a position about ten centimeters above the left shoulder, blade edge up, and with the point facing backwards. The movement resembles a thrust to the rear. Unlike in Musō Jikiden Eishin-ryū, the sword does not fall off behind the back but always stays over shoulder height. The right hand then raises the sword overhead while the left hand takes its place on the hilt, thus entering in the jōdan stance or kamae. The sword should now be right in the middle line of the body, with the tip raised forty-five degrees upward (Chuden) or level with the ground (Shoden) and your left hand hovering just above your forehead.

=== Nōtō ===
In Musō Shinden-ryū, the sheathing is performed horizontally with the blade outwards. In Shimomura-Ha lignage, more usual, only when the sword is about two-thirds of the way in the saya is the edge turned to face upwards, but there is also a Tanimura-Ha lignage inside Muso Shiden Ryu, and the sword is in the saya is the edge turned to face upwards. The blade and saya should cross your center line at a 45-degree angle while sheathing.

== Techniques ==
=== Shoden (初伝) ===
The word "Shoden", which can be translated as the "first transmission", consists of the kata of Ōmori-ryū iaijutsu plus one kata variation exclusive to Musō Shinden-ryū. The kata start from the seiza sitting posture. This series of kata became the first to be learned when the 17th headmaster of the Tanimura branch, Ōe Masamichi, reorganized and rationalized the curriculum of Hasegawa Eishin-ryū at the start of the 20th century. The kata Ryūtō, which involves the Ukenagashi technique, is often considered as the most difficult kata of the Omori set. The seventh kata, Juntō was created neither for dueling nor for self-defense, but to serve as kaishakunin.

According to his own memoirs, Nakayama Hakudō invented the twelfth kata, In'yō Shintai Kaewaza, as a variation on the fifth kata In'yō Shintai.

The following is the order given by Yamatsuta. In some schools, the order of the last two kata are reversed.

- 01. Shohattō (初発刀)
- 02. Satō (左刀)
- 03. Utō (右刀)
- 04. Ataritō (当刀)
- 05. In'yō Shintai (陰陽進退)
- 06. Ryūtō (流刀)
- 07. Juntō (順刀)
- 08. Gyakutō (逆刀)
- 09. Seichūtō (勢中刀)
- 10. Korantō (虎乱刀)
- 11. In'yō Shintai Kaewaza (陰陽進退替業)
- 12. Battō (抜刀)

=== Chūden (中伝) ===
The word "Chūden" can be translated as the "middle-transmission" and consists of ten techniques from Hasegawa Eishin-ryū. This series of kata is executed from the tachihiza (more commonly called tatehiza) sitting position. In contrast to the first series of kata, the enemy is considered to be sitting very close and thus the primary goal of the chūden techniques is to create proper cutting distance (kirima) by stepping back instead of forward.

Ōe Masamichi is credited with developing the hayanuki (quick draw) exercise. In this style of training, the practitioner executes all ten techniques in a row. Two versions of hayanuki exist. In one version, both the left and right hands are used to execute the movements, just as in the normal practice. The second version involves drawing the sword with only the right hand, as if you were on a horse. This kind of practice is not done in formal presentations.

- 01. Yokogumo (横雲)
- 02. Toraissoku (虎一足)
- 03. Inazuma (稲妻)
- 04. Ukigumo (浮雲)
- 05. Yamaoroshi (山颪)
- 06. Iwanami (岩浪)
- 07. Urokogaeshi (鱗返)
- 08. Namigaeshi (浪返)
- 09. Takiotoshi (滝落)
- 10. Nukiuchi (抜打)

=== Okuden (奥伝) ===
The word "Okuden" can be translated as the "inner transmission". Oku-iai, as it is also called, is divided into two groups: suwari-waza (sitting techniques) and tachi-waza (standing techniques). As in Chūden, the sitting techniques are performed from tatehiza.

Suwari-waza (座業)

- 01. Kasumi (霞) – Mist
- 02. Sunegakoi (脛囲) – Covering the shin
- 03. Shihogiri (四方切) – Cutting four corners
- 04. Tozume (戸詰) – Across the screen doors
- 05. Towaki (戸脇) – Along the screen doors
- 06. Tanashita (棚下) – Under the shelf
- 07. Ryozume (両詰) – Obstacles on both sides
- 08. Torabashiiri (虎走) – Running Tiger
- 09. *Itomagoi (暇乞) – Request Leave of Absence [Three forms]

* Despite the fact to be a sitting-form, in an Enbu the Itomagoi form is usually performed after the execution of all standing forms so the kenshi is ready to begin the finishing reiho, like Battô in Omori-ryu and Nukiuchi in Hasegawa Eishin Ryu.

Tachi-waza (立業)

- 01. Yukitsure (行連) – Escort
- 02. Rentatsu (連達) – Escort
- 03. Somakuri (惣捲) – Cutting the multiple opponents
- 04. Sodome (総留) – One-handed cuts
- 05. Shinobu (信夫) – Stealth
- 06. Yukichigai (行違) – Passing by
- 07. Sodesurigaeshi (袖摺返) – Flipping the sleeves
- 08. Moniri (門入) – Entering the gate
- 09. Kabezoi (壁添) – Along the walls
- 10. Ukenagashi (受流) – Block and deflect
- 11. *Oikakegiri (追掛斬) – Pursue & Cut Down
- 12. Ryoushihikitsure (両士引連) – Accompanied Journey

* This is believed to be a kata that Oe Masamichi Sensei discarded when he re-organized the old tradition. It is generally not performed.

=== Kumitachi ===
The paired Kumitachi techniques (the kenjutsu part of the curriculum) are rarely taught today. Tachi Uchi-no-Kurai and Tsumeiai-no-Kurai are the series most often taught.

Tachi Uchi-no-Kurai (太刀打之位)

- 1. Deai (出合)
- 2. Tsukekomi (附込)
- 3. Ukenagashi (請流)
- 4. Ukeire (請入)
- 5. Tsukikage (月影)
- 6. Suigetsutō (水月刀)
- 7. Dokumyōken (独妙剣)
- 8. Zetsumyōken (絶妙剣)
- 9. Shinmyōken (心明剣)
- 10. Uchikomi (打込)

Tsume Iai-no-Kurai (詰居合之位)

- 1. Hassō (発早・發早・八相)
- 2. Kobushidori (拳取)
- 3. Iwanami (岩浪)
- 4. Yaegaki (八重垣)
- 5. Urokogaeshi (鱗返)
- 6. Kuraiyurumi (位弛)
- 7. Tsubamegaeshi (燕返)
- 8. Gansekiotoshi (眼関落)
- 9. Suigetsutō (水月刀)
- 10. Kasumiken (霞剣)
