= Iaijutsu =

Combative quick-draw sword technique

- 居合術 いあいじゅつ
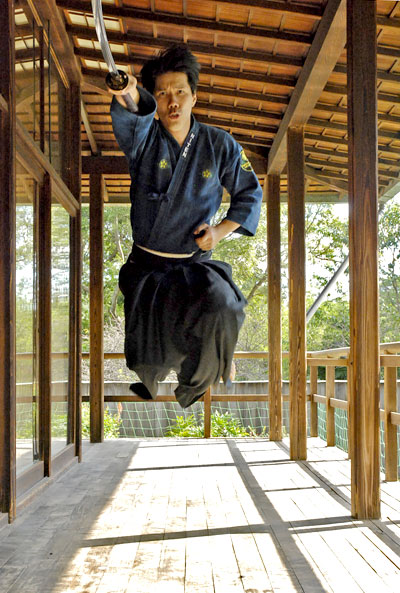
- Focus: Katana
- Hardness: Non-competitive
- Country of origin: Japan
- Date of formation: In the Nara period (710–794)
- Olympic sport: No

Iaijutsu (居合術) is a combative quick-draw sword technique. This art of drawing the katana is one of the Japanese ko-ryū martial art disciplines in the education of the classical warrior (bushi).

== Purpose ==
Iaijutsu is a combative sword-drawing art but not necessarily an aggressive art because iaijutsu is also a counterattack-oriented art. Iaijutsu technique may be used aggressively to wage a premeditated surprise attack against an unsuspecting enemy. The formulation of iaijutsu as a component system of classical bujutsu was made less for the dynamic situations of the battlefield than for the relatively static applications of the warrior's daily life off the field of battle.

== Etymology ==
Battōjutsu is an older name for iaijutsu. Historically, it is unclear when the term "iaijutsu" originated. It is also unclear when techniques to draw katana from the scabbard were first practiced as a dedicated form of exercise. The Japanese sword has existed since the Nara period (710–794), where techniques to draw the sword have been practiced under other names than "iaijutsu". The term "iaijutsu" was first verified in connection with Iizasa Chōisai Ienao (c. 1387 – c. 1488), founder of the school Tenshin Shōden Katori Shintō-ryū.

== History ==
Archaeological excavations dated the oldest sword in Japan from at least as early as second century BC. The Kojiki (Record of Ancient Matters) and the Nihon Shoki (History of Japan), ancient texts on early Japanese history and myth that were compiled in the eighth century AD, describe iron swords and swordsmanship that predate recorded history, attributed to the mythological age of the gods (kami).

The development of Japanese swordsmanship as a component system of classical bujutsu created by and for professional warriors (bushi), begins only with the invention and widespread use of the Japanese sword, the curved, single-cutting-edged long sword. In its curved form, the sword is known to the Japanese as tachi in the eighth century. It evolved from and gained ascendancy over its straight-bladed prototype because years of battlefield experience proved that the curved form of sword was better suited to the needs of the bushi than the straight-bladed kind. Around the curved long sword the bushi built a mystique of fantastic dimensions, one that still influences Japanese culture today. The nature of the bushi's combative deployment, mounted as he was on horseback, required the classical warrior to reach out for his enemy, who might either be similarly mounted or otherwise ground-deployed.

During the Kamakura period (1185–1333) the Japanese sword smiths achieved the highest level of technical excellence because the war between two influential families, the Minamoto and the Taira, made it possible to test and evaluate swords under the severest of conditions. By the end of the Kamakura period the tachi was superseded by a shorter weapon in a new form, called katana.

It was with the general widespread use of the curved sword mounted and worn as a katana that classical Japanese swordsmanship for infantry applications really begins. The earliest reliable documentation to prove that the bushi practiced swordsmanship in a systematic manner is dated in the 15th century. In this connection it is believed that kenjutsu, which deals with the art of swordsmanship as it is performed with an unsheathed sword, is the preceding form of iaijutsu.

Iaijutsu is extant today, but there also exists a modern form for drawing the Japanese sword called iaido, a term which first appeared in 1932.

== Relationship to iaidō ==
The distinction between iaijutsu and iaidō is not always clear. A common distinction is purpose, describing iaijutsu as a classical sword-drawing art practiced for combative purposes, while regarding iaidō as a discipline oriented more toward personal and spiritual cultivation. Draeger used seiza as one example of this distinction, describing it as a "dead" posture from a combative standpoint.

In practice, however, this distinction is not absolute. Musō Jikiden Eishin-ryū, commonly described as a school of iaijutsu, includes an entire series of techniques performed from seiza, the Ōmori-ryū seiza waza. Other schools of iaijutsu employing the seiza starting position include Mugai ryu and Tatsumi ryū. Classical martial arts may also employ predetermined kata, restrictive postures, or otherwise disadvantageous circumstances as training methods rather than as representations of an ideal combative situation. A method intended to develop practical fighting skills therefore does not require every exercise within its curriculum to be itself the most practical or efficient response to combat.

Draeger himself also acknowledged overlap between combative technique and personal or spiritual development. In discussing Mugai-ryū, he described its aggressive swordsmanship as outwardly similar to purely combative methods while emphasizing that its training contained a strong spiritual purpose and aimed at the unification of spirit and technique. Thus, even within Draeger's distinction, practical swordsmanship and personal cultivation were not necessarily mutually exclusive aims.

The terms jutsu ("technique") and dō ("way") likewise do not always describe mutually exclusive categories. In modern usage, the distinction may indicate a difference in emphasis, but may also reflect lineage, historical usage, organizational convention, or terminology. Iaijutsu may therefore place greater emphasis on the practical and efficient use of the sword while sharing substantial portions of its training methods and objectives with iaidō.

== Koryū Schools ==
Some of the Ryū that still exist and include iaijutsu in their curriculum are listed below. These schools are koryū, or arts developed before the Meiji era:

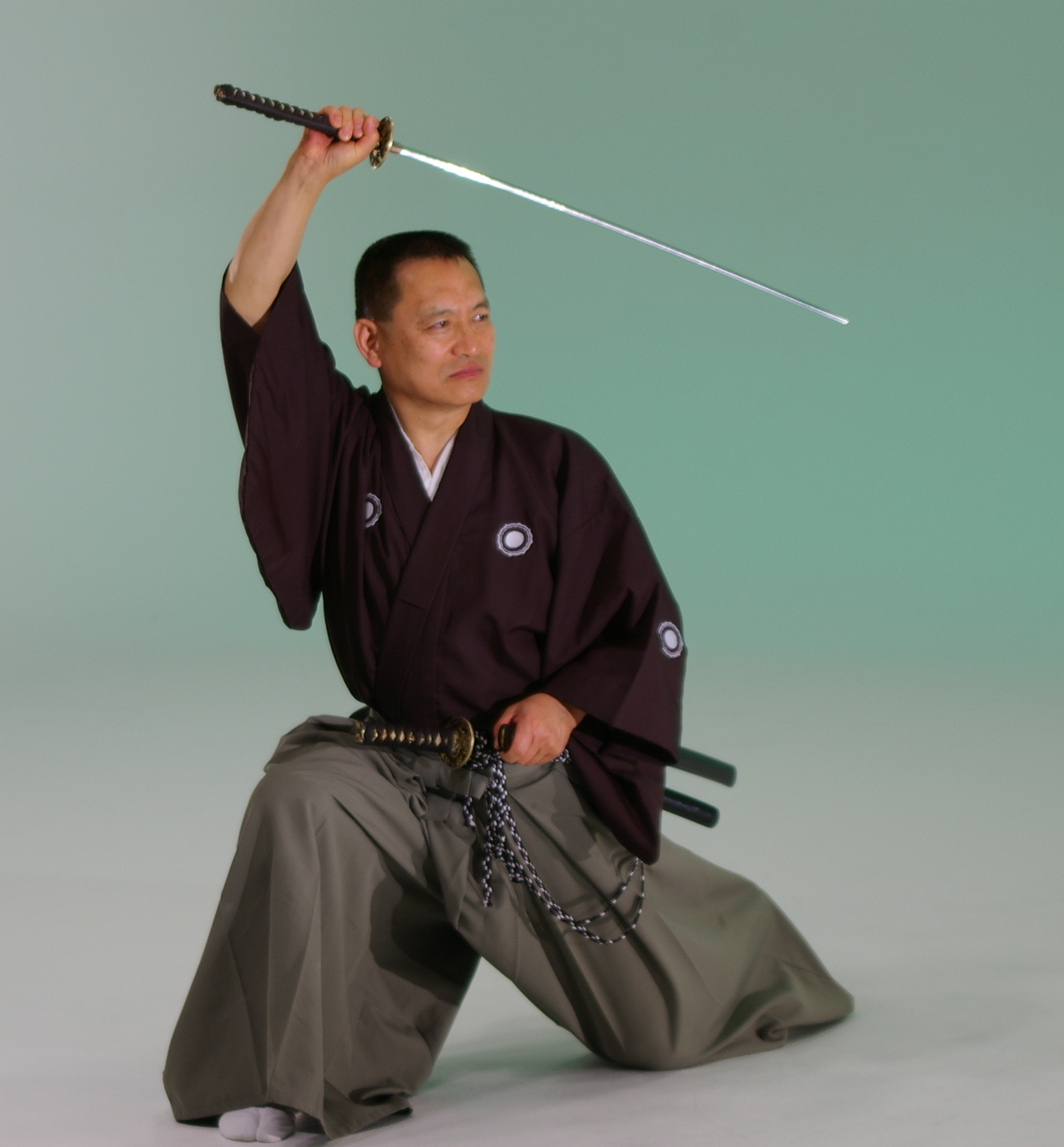
Niina Gyokudo, soke of Mugai Ryu, demonstrates the Inchuyo technique.

Selected classical schools associated with iaijutsu
| School | Founding | Status | Distinctive features |
|---|---|---|---|
| Musō Jikiden Eishin-ryū (無雙直傳英信流) | Hasegawa Chikaranosuke Eishin; 16th–17th century; Tosa | Extant | Large iai curriculum using seiza, tatehiza, and standing forms; one of the major surviving Hayashizaki-derived traditions. |
| Suiō-ryū Iai Kenpō (水鷗流居合剣法) | Mima Yoichizaemon Kagenobu; c. 1600 | Extant | Comprehensive system centered on iai, with kenjutsu, naginata, jō, and other weapons. Its iai includes several sets of kata performed from seiza, standing positions, and paired practice. |
| Sekiguchi-ryū (関口流) | Sekiguchi Ujimune; c. 1640; Kishū | Extant | Comprehensive system combining jūjutsu, kenjutsu, and iaijutsu. Its iai includes seated and paired practice, with extensive use of tobichigai-giri. |
| Jikyō-ryū (自鏡流居合) | Taga Jikyōken Morimasa; late 17th century; Edo | Survives in other tradition | A Hayashizaki-derived tradition transmitted through some lineages of Mugai-ryū kenjutsu. Features seated forms and paired kumiai. Not to be confused with modern Mugai-ryū Iai Hyōdō. |
| Tenshin Shōden Katori Shintō-ryū (天真正伝香取神道流) | Iizasa Chōisai Ienao; 15th century; Shimōsa | Extant | Very old comprehensive martial system; iai forms part of a much broader weapons curriculum. |
| Tamiya Shinken-ryū (田宮神剣流) | Tamiya Heibei Narimasa; late 16th–early 17th century | Extant | Hayashizaki-derived iai; shares features with other Hayashizaki-derived schools, including forms from seiza, tatehiza, and standing positions. |
| Yagyū Seigō-ryū (柳生制剛流) | Mizuhaya Chōzaemon Nobumasa; early Edo period; Owari | Extant | Originated as Seigō-ryū and was incorporated into the Yagyū Shinkage-ryū tradition. Its iai/battō is integrated with Yagyū Shinkage-ryū principles, includes seated and standing techniques, and is largely defensive in approach. |
| Hōki-ryū (伯耆流) | Katayama Hōki-no-kami Hisayasu; late 16th century | Extant | Distinct iai tradition with important regional transmissions, especially in Kumamoto. |
| Shingyōtō-ryū (心形刀流) | Iba Jōsuiken Hideaki; 1682; Edo | Extant | Calls its iai nukiai (抜合); seated forms feature vigorous rising, turning, and varied cuts and thrusts. Closely integrated with a broader kenjutsu curriculum including ōdachi, kodachi, and nitō. |
| Shin Shinkage Ichien-ryū (新神陰一円流) | Nonaka Shinzō Naritsune; 16th century | Extinct | Early Shinkage-derived system associated with circular sword movement and an influence on the later Shindō Munen-ryū. |
| Shindō Munen-ryū (神道無念流) | Fukui Hyōemon Yoshihira; early 18th century; Edo | Extant | Powerful, direct swordsmanship; some transmissions preserve iai alongside kenjutsu and later gekiken practice. |
| Shin Musō Hayashizaki-ryū (神夢想林崎流) | Hayashizaki lineage; 16th–17th century; Tsugaru/Hirosaki | Extant | Features paired iai using a 3-shaku-3-sun sword against a short sword from extremely close range. |

== See also ==
- Iaidō
- Fast draw
- Kendo
- Kenjutsu
