= Takemikazuchi =

Japanese thunder god

- God of War, Thunder, Swords, Ice, Martial Arts and Earthquake-Control
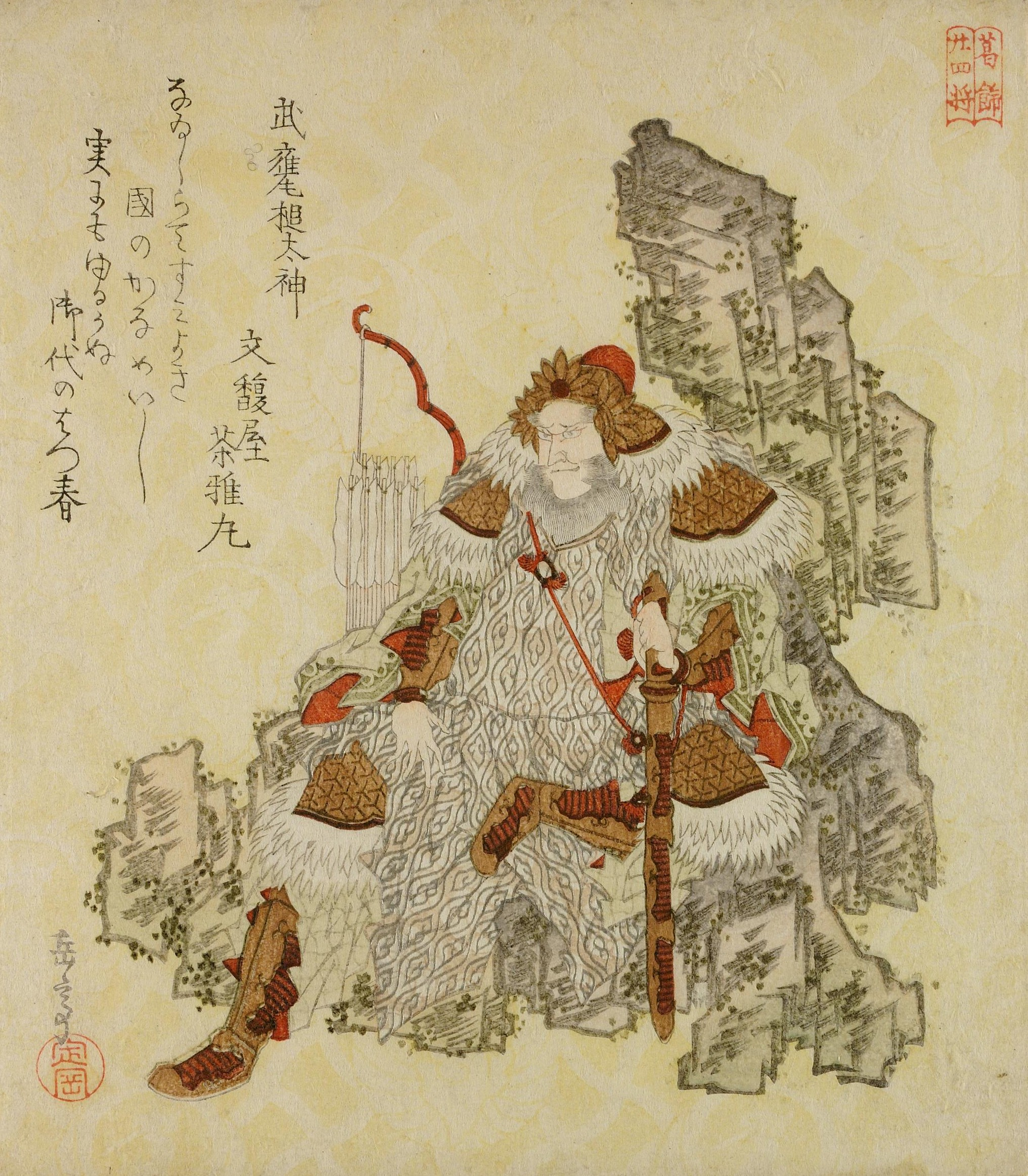
- Surimono of Takemikazuchi, from the series "Twenty-Four Generals for the Katsushika Circle" (Katsushika nijûshishô), by Yashima Gakutei

Genealogy
- Parents: Kagu-tsuchi / Ame-no-ohabari (father)
- Siblings: Futsunushi

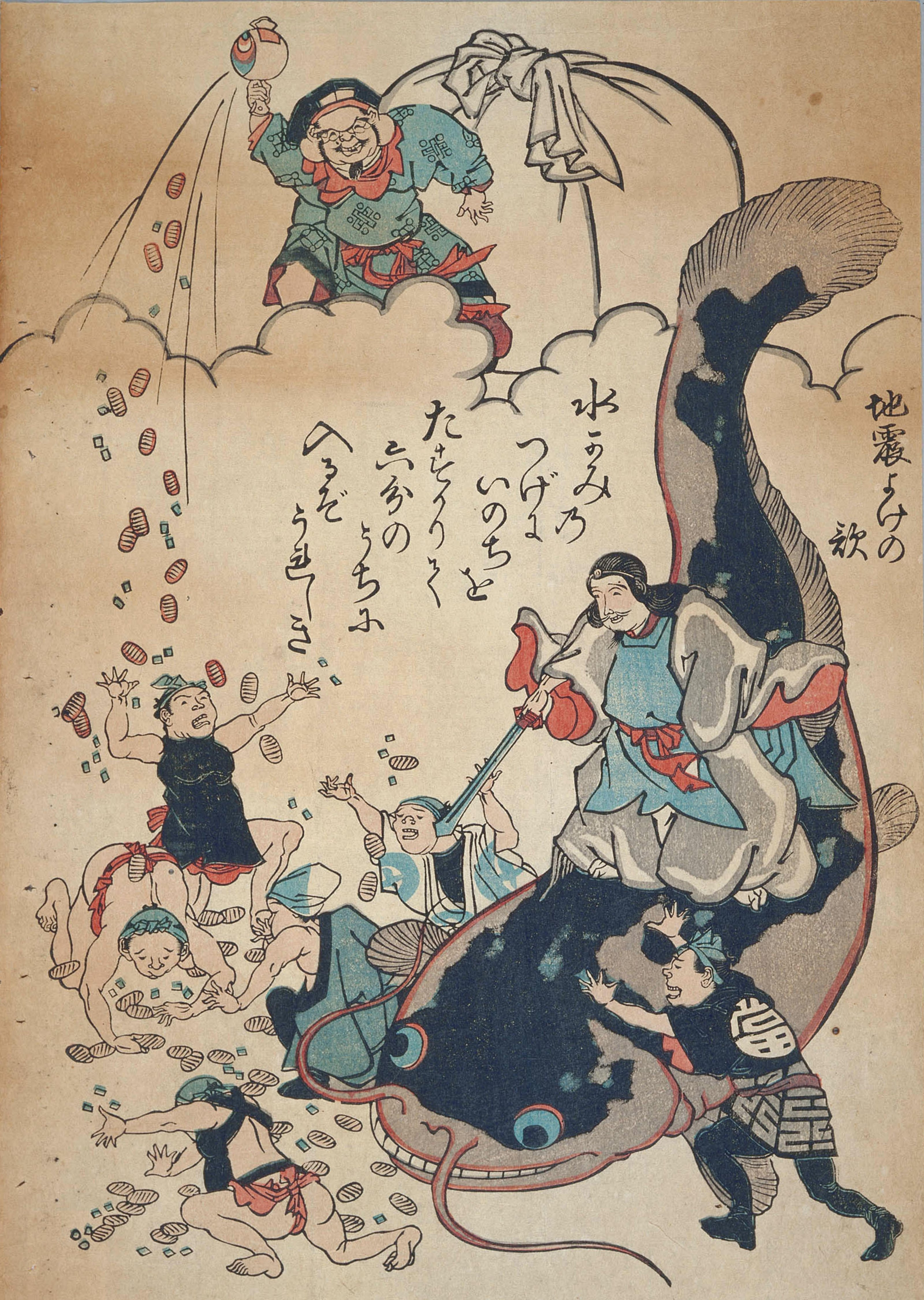
Earthquake-warding song (a namazu-e woodblock pamphlet, October 1855). The figure holding down the Namazu (mythical catfish) is believed to be Takemikazuchi.

Takemikazuchi (建御雷/武甕槌) is a deity in Japanese mythology, considered a god of thunder and a sword god. He also competed in what is considered the first sumo wrestling match recorded in history.

He is otherwise known as "The kami of Kashima" (Kashima-no-kami), the chief deity revered in the Kashima Shrine at Kashima, Ibaraki (and all other subsidiary Kashima shrines). In the namazu-e or catfish prints of the Edo period, Takemikazuchi/Kashima is depicted attempting to subdue the Namazu, a giant catfish supposedly dwelling at the kaname-ishi (要石; 'pinning rock') of the Japanese landmass and causing its earthquakes.

== Forms of the name ==

In the Kojiki, the god is known as Takemikazuchi-no-o no kami (建御雷之男神 – "Brave Mighty Thunderbolt Man"). He also bears the alternate names Takefutsu-no-kami (建布都神) and Toyofutsu-no-kami (豊布都神).

=== Birth of the gods ===
In the Kamiumi ("birth of the gods") episodes of the Kojiki, the god of creation Izanagi severs the head of the fire deity Kagu-tsuchi, whereupon the blood from the sword (Totsuka-no-Tsurugi) splattered the rocks and gave birth to several deities. The blood from the sword-tip engendered one triad of deities, and the blood from near the base of the blade produced another triad that included Takemikazuchi (here given as "Brave-Awful-Possessing-Male-Deity" by Chamberlain).

The name of the ten-fist sword wielded by Izanagi is given postscripturally as Ame-no-ohabari, otherwise known as Itsu-no-ohabari. (Accordingly, Takemikazuchi is referred in some passages as the child of Itsu-no-o habari. See next section).

The Nihon Shoki gives the same episode in the same general gist, albeit more vaguely regarding this deity.

=== Quelling of the Middle Country ===
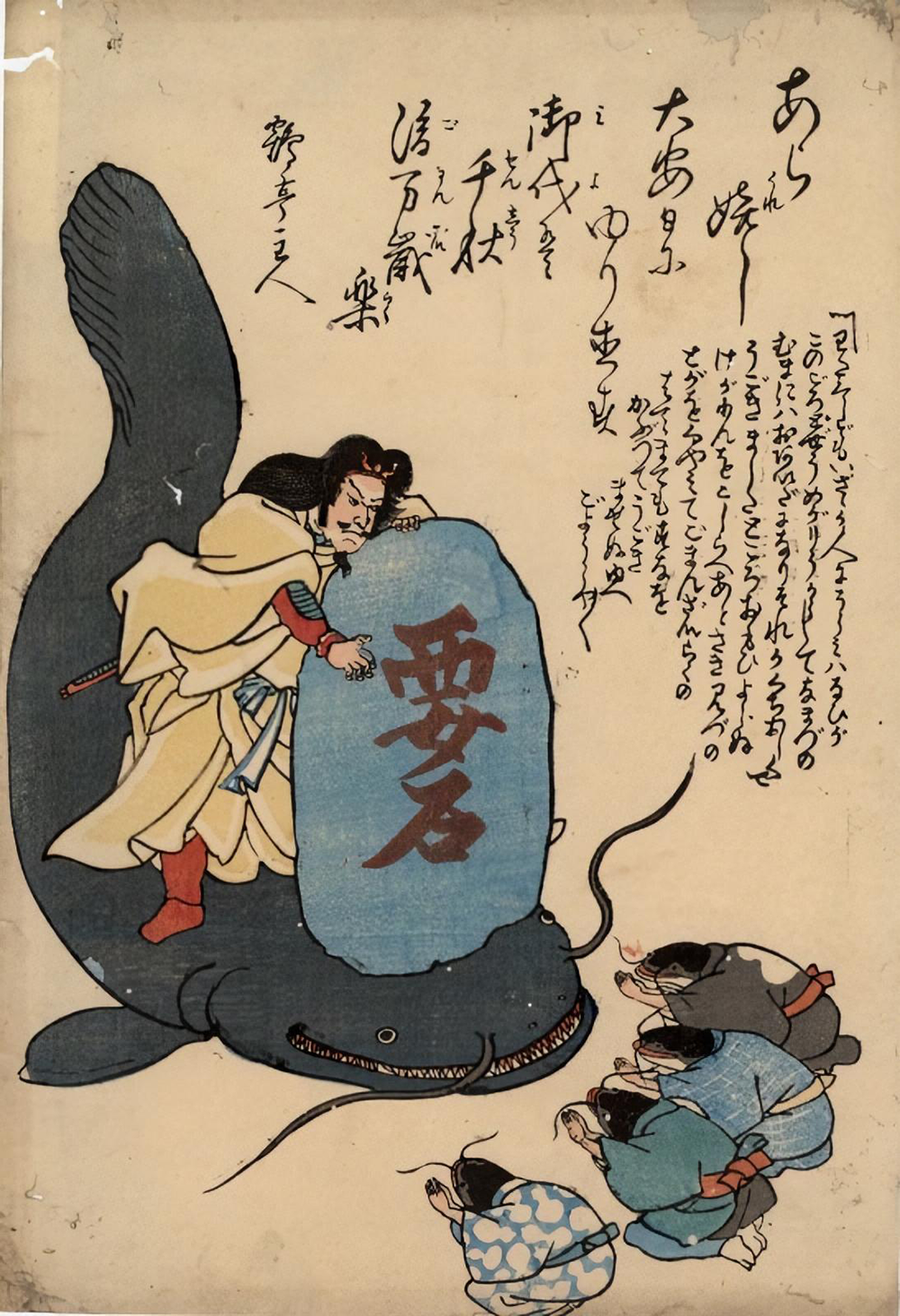
Takemikazuchi pins down a catfish (namazu) with a rock (kaname-ishi) to prevent earthquakes, 1855

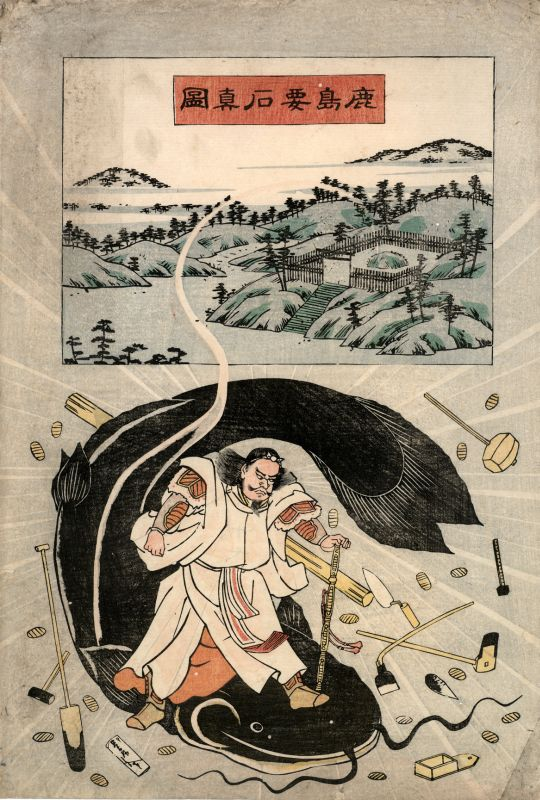
Another Namazu-e depicting Takemikazuchi riding the catfish. Above is a depiction of the kaname-ishi, the rock used to subdue the fish

In the episodes where the gods of the heavenly plains (Takama-ga-hara) contemplate and execute the conquest of the terrestrial world known as Middle Country (Ashihara no Nakatsukuni), Takemikazuchi is one of the chief delegates sent down to subjugate the terrestrial deities (kuni-tsu-kami).

In the Kojiki (Conquest of Izumo chapter), the heavenly deities Amaterasu and Takamusubi decreed that either Takemikazuchi or his father Itsu-no-ohabari ("Heaven-Point-Blade-Extended") must be sent down for the conquest. Itsu-no-ohabari (who appeared previously as a ten-fist sword) here has the mind and speech of a sentient god, and he volunteered his son Takemikazuchi for the subjugation campaign. Takemikazuchi was accompanied by Ame-no-torifune "Deity Heavenly-Bird-Boat" (which may be a boat as well as being a god)

The two deities reached the land of Izumo at a place called "the little shore of Izasa/Inasa" (伊耶佐小浜), and stuck a "ten-fist sword" (Totsuka-no-Tsurugi) upside-down on the crest of the wave, and sat atop it, while demanding the local god Ōkuninushi to relinquish the Izumo province over to them. Ōkuninushi replied he would defer the decision to his child deities, and would follow suit in their counsel. One of them, Kotoshironushi or Yae-Kotoshironushi ("Eight-Fold-Thing-Sign-Master") who had been out fishing, was easily persuaded to forfeit his authority and retire into seclusion.

The other, Takeminakata would not concede without testing his feats of strength against Takemikazuchi. When the challenger grabbed Takemikazuchi's hand it turned as if into an icicle and then a sword, making him cringe. Takemikazuchi then grabbed Takeminakata's hand, crushing it like a young reed. The challenger, chased to the sea near Suwa of Shinano (科野国之州羽海; in Kojiki), asked for clemency on his life, promising to hold himself in exile in that region. In this way, the defeated Takeminakata became chief deity of the Suwa Grand Shrine in Nagano Prefecture.

The hand-to-hand bout between the two deities is considered the mythical origin of sumo wrestling.

The Nihon Shoki names a different partner for Takemikazuchi in the task of conquering lands of the Middle Country. That partner is his brother Futsunushi (a god who goes unmentioned in the Kojiki in the gods' birth episode as well as this episode).

Just as Takemikazuchi was chief deity of Kashima Shrine, this Futsunushi was the chief of the Katori Shrine. In the early centuries, when the Yamato rulers campaigned in the Kantō and Tōhoku regions, they would pray to these two war gods for military success, so that subsidiary shrines of the two gods are scattered all over these regions. The enshrinement of the deities at Kashima and Katori is mentioned briefly in the Kogo Shūi (807).

The Nihon Shoki account has other discrepancies. The beach where the gods stuck the "ten-fist sword" is here called "Itasa". The chief god of Izumo (Ōkuninushi) is called by the name of Ōanamuchi. (Note: Oho-na-mochi in Aston 1896) The wrestling match with Takeminakata is missing. In the end, Ōanamuchi/Ōkuninushi gave sign of his obedience by presenting the broad spear he used to pacify the land with. Jumping to a later passage (after digressing on other matters), the Nihon Shoki retells Takemikazuchi and Futsunushi's landing on the beach, this time stating that Ōanamuchi verbally expressed resistance to relinquish his rule, until the heavenly gods promised him palatial residence to recompense his abdication.

Appended to the two passages is the mention of a star deity named Amatsu-Mikaboshi who resisted till the end, and whom Takemikazuchi and Futsunushi were particularly eager to vanquish. The latter passage states that the being who subdued the star god, referred to as Iwai no nushi (斎の大人) is enshrined at Katori, hinting that it might be Futsunushi. However, the earlier passage says a god named Takehazuchi was the vanquisher of the star god.

=== Emperor Jimmu's conquest of the East ===
Takemikazuchi's sword aided Emperor Jimmu in his subjugation of the east. At Kumano, the Emperor and his troops were either struck unconscious by the appearance of a bear (Kojiki) or severely debilitated by the poison fumes spewed out by local gods (Nihon Shoki). But a man named Takakuraji presented a gift of a sword, the emperor awoke, and without him hardly brandishing this weapon, the evil deities of Kumano were spontaneously cut down. When Jimmu inquired, Takakuraji explained that he had a vision in a dream where the supreme deities Amaterasu and Takamusubi were about to command Takemikazuchi to descend to earth once again to pacify the lands, this time to assist the emperor. However, Takemizuchi replied that it would be sufficient to send down the sword he used during his campaigns, and, boring a hole through Takakuraji's storehouse, deposited the sword, bidding the man to present it to Emperor Jimmu. That sword bore the names of Futsu-no-mitama (布都御魂), Saji-futsu-no-kami (佐士布都神), and Mika-futsu no kami (甕布都神). This sword is the main dedication (goshintai) kept at Isonokami Shrine.

== Commentary ==
According to Iwao Ōwa in his Jinja to kodai ōken saishi (1989), Takemikazuchi was originally a local god (kunitsukami) revered by the Ō clan (多氏, Ō no uji; also written as 大氏), and was a god of maritime travel. However, the Nakatomi clan also has roots in this region, and when they took over control of priestly duties from the Ō clan, they claimed Takemikazuchi as the Nakatomi clan's ujigami (clan deity). Ōwa goes on to theorize that the Ō clan was originally ōmi (大忌, "greater taboo (priesthood)"), but was usurped by the Nakatomi who were among the "lesser priesthood" (the latter claims descent from the Inbe clan (忌部氏)).

The Nakatomi clan, essentially the priestly branch of the Fujiwara clan, also placed the veneration of Takemikazuchi in the Kasuga-taisha in Nara. (The thunder god is one of several gods enshrined.)

When the Yamato kingship expanded control into the easterly dominions, Kashima (Kashima, Ibaraki) became a crucial base. Yamato armies and generals often prayed to the Kashima and Katori deities for military success against the intransigents in the east. In these ways, Takemikazuchi became an important deity for the imperial dynasty.

== In popular culture ==
- Takemikazuchi is a supporting character in the popular manga and anime series Noragami.
- Takemikazuchi is the leader of the Takemikazuchi Familia in the manga and anime series DanMachi.
- In the video game Persona 4, Take-Mikazuchi is Kanji Tatsumi's initial Persona.
- Takemikazuchi is the name of one of the Supreme Beings in the Overlord series.
- There is a Digimon named Kazuchimon. Along with another Digimon named Fenriloogamon, both can DNA digivolve into its combined form, known as Fenriloogamon: Takemikazuchi.
- In the videogame Naruto Shippuden: Ultimate Ninja Storm 4, Sasuke Uchiha can use an Ultimate Move called "Takemikazuchi".
- In the visual novel Muv-Luv Alternative Type-00 Takemikazuchi is the name of the best Tactical Surface Fighter mech of the Imperial Japanese Mainland Defence Force, only being accessible to the Imperial Royal Guard pilots.
- In the video game Bayonetta 2, players can acquire the Takemikazuchi, a massive metal hammer with lightning motifs, after collecting the three pieces of The Harmonious Blacksmith LP.
- In the anime "Sound Of The Sky", The Tank assigned to the main cast is named Takemikazuchi

== See also ==
- Kamiumi
- List of Japanese deities
