= Nakamura-ryū =

Martial art style

Nakamura-ryū Happōgiri Battōdō
- Also known as: Nakamura-ryū Battōdō
- Country of origin: Japan
- Founder: Nakamura Taizaburō
- Arts taught: Battōdō

Nakamura-ryū Happōgiri Battōdō (中村流八方切り抜刀道) is a battō style created by Nakamura Taizaburō (1912–2003).

== Nakamura Taizaburō ==
Nakamura Taizaburō (中村 泰三郎) was born in 1912 in Yamagata Prefecture. He resided in Tsurumi, Yokohama, where he presided over the International Iai-Battōdō Federation and taught battōdō for the Kakuseikai until his death in 2003.

Nakamura was awarded 10th dan hanshi battōdō by the International Martial Arts Federation, 7th dan kyōshi by the All Japan Kendō Federation, 8th dan hanshi, Jukendō and 8th dan hanshi, Tankendō. In 1973 he was awarded the Order of the Sacred Treasure in recognition for his services in promoting the martial arts.

Iai to wa, hito ni kirarezu, hito kirazu.
Jiko no renma ni, shugi no michi.

Iai: not killing others; not being killed by others.
Self-training and polishing, the road to discipline and cultivation.

== History ==
Nakamura developed battōdō while teaching kenjutsu in northern China. He was inspired by the idea that the eiji happō (the eight principles of writing kanji) could be applied to swordsmanship. He began to organize his understandings into a system of practical swordsmanship in which non-martial techniques were discarded (much like the practical Toyama-ryū of the early 20th century).

The system is based on Nakamura's studies whilst teaching Toyama-ryū: bringing the sword blade to a halt after a cut, parrying, progressing to the next combative posture using the sword's kinetic energy. It also makes use of what, through his researches, Nakamura found absent from many other schools of iaidō, kendō, and battōjutsu: the kesagiri, a cut he thought extremely useful.

== The style ==
The cutting techniques of the Nakamura-ryū are effective in their simplicity: the thrust (either single- or double-handed), the downward vertical cut, left downward diagonal cut, right upward diagonal cut, right downward diagonal cut, left upward diagonal cut, left horizontal cut, and right horizontal cut. The eight cutting techniques are derived from the eiji happō.

Eight chiburi were then incorporated into the system. The basic chiburi used in both Toyama-ryū iaidō and Nakamura-ryū battōdō is actually an en garde position: the sword is snapped down, its point slightly elevated at knee level; from this position, one can maintain zanshin as well as convert easily to a thrust, should the need arise. Nakamura added seven more chiburi, notably from Ōmori-ryū and Tenshin Shōden Katori Shintō-ryū kenjutsu.

The five kamae of kendō/iaidō were also incorporated into the style, to which were added the left-side versions of waki kamae and hasso kamae, and right jodan kamae, making eight kamae altogether.

== Related links ==
- International Batto-Do Federation (mostly in Japanese)
- International Batto-Do Federation English site
- All IBF Registered Overseas Dojo
- Video clip of Nakamura-sensei performing tameshigiri
- Another video clip of Nakamura-sensei performing tameshigiri
