= Tenshin Shōden Katori Shintō-ryū =

Japanese martial art

Tenshin Shōden Katori Shintō-ryū (天真正伝香取神道流)
- Ko-ryū
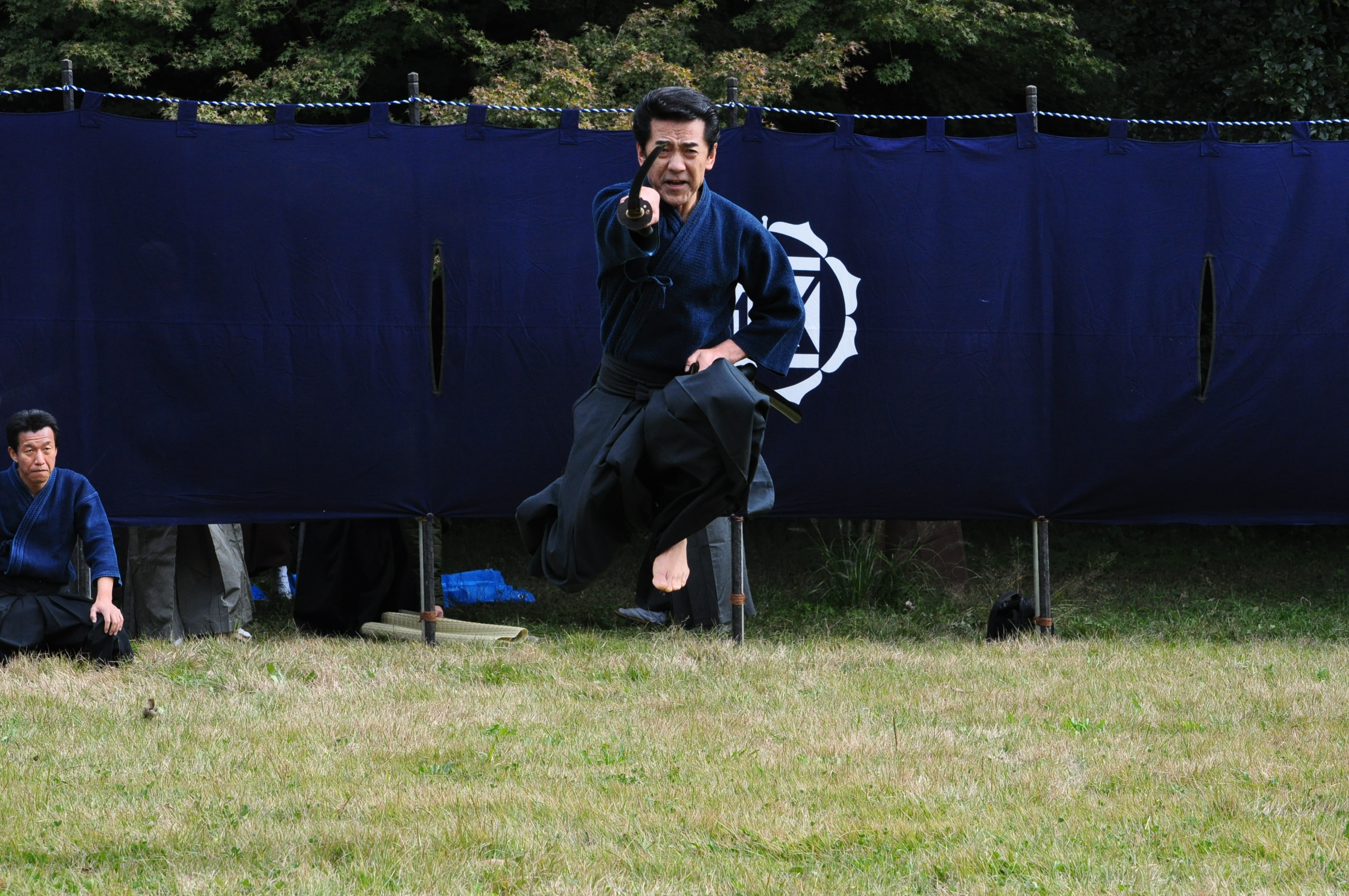
- Meiji Shrine festival special dedication

Foundation
- Founder: Iizasa Chōisai Ienao (飯篠 長威斉 家直, c.1387–c.1488)
- Date founded: c.1447
- Period founded: Middle Muromachi period (1336–1573)
- Location founded: Shimōsa Province

Current information
- Current headmaster: Yasusada Iizasa (飯篠 修理亮 快貞 Iizasa Shūri-no-Suke Yasusada, born c.20th century)
- Current headquarters: Katori, Chiba

Arts taught
- Art: Description
- Kenjutsu: Sword art
- Battōjutsu: Art of drawing the sword
- Ryōtōjutsu: Art of dual-wielding swords (usu. one long one short)
- Bōjutsu: Staff art
- Naginatajutsu: Glaive art
- Sōjutsu: Spear art
- Shurikenjutsu: Dart throwing art
- Jujutsu: Hybrid art, unarmed or with minor weapons

Ancestor schools
- Katori no Ken, Kashima no Ken

Descendant schools
- Nakamura-ryū; Meifu Shinkage-ryū; Shintō Musō-ryū; Yagyū Shinkage-ryū

Tenshin Shōden Katori Shintō-ryū (天真正伝香取神道流) (Note: Written as 天眞正傳香取神道流 before adoption (1946) of Tōyō kanji.) is one of the oldest extant Japanese martial arts and an exemplar of bujutsu. It was founded by Iizasa Ienao, who lived near Katori Shrine (Sawara City, Chiba Prefecture) at the time. The ryū is purported to have been founded in 1447, but some scholars state that it was about 1480. (Note: The year 1387 is given as Iizasa's birth year in Deity and the Sword, Vol 1 pp. 16–17. Watatani (1967) speculates that 1417–1420 is correct.)

== History ==
=== Foundation ===
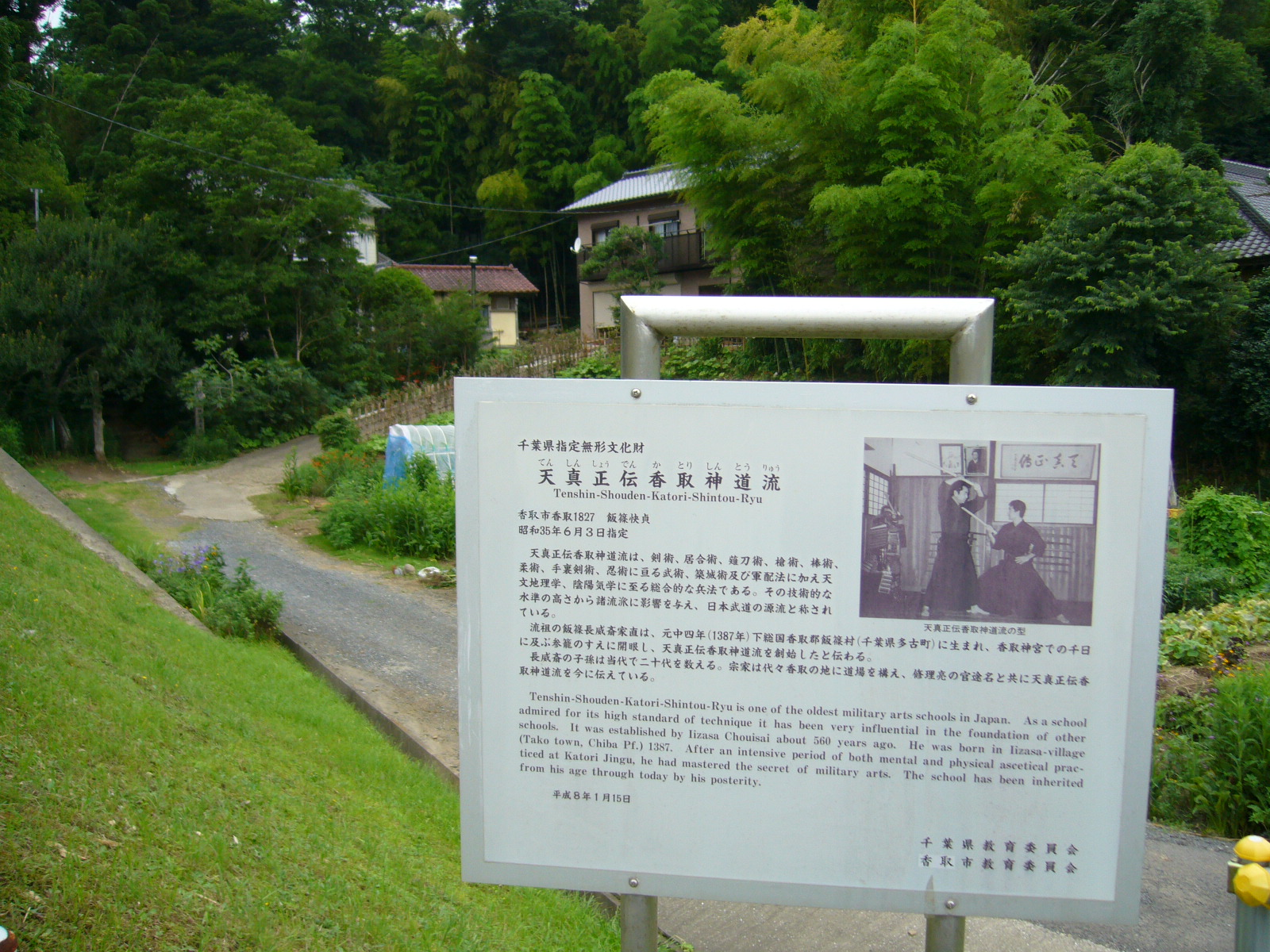
Katori Shinto Ryu Dojo training hall in Katori city, Japan

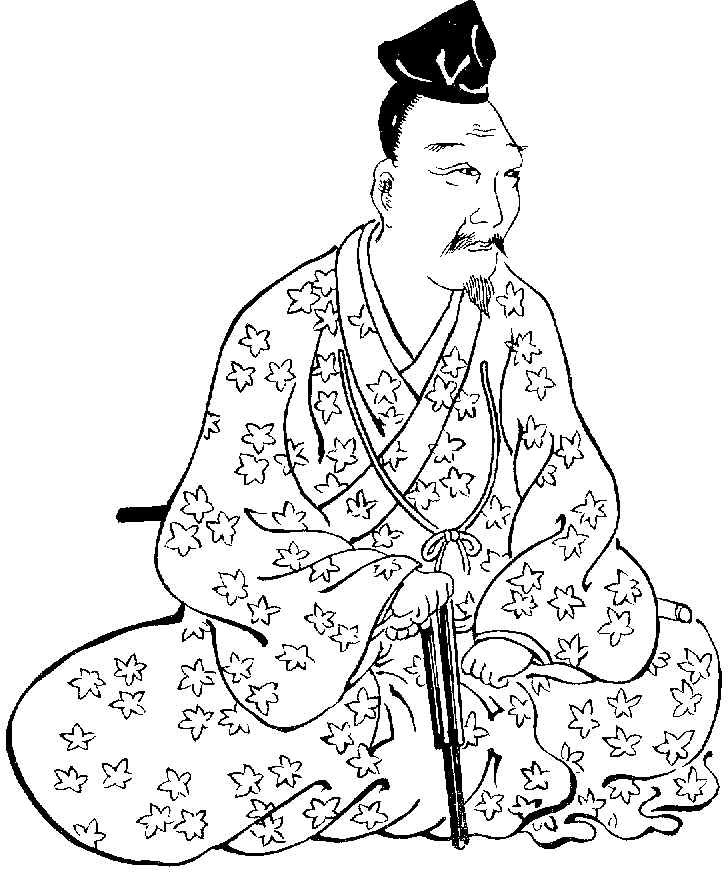
Iizasa Ienao founded Tenshin Shōden Katori Shintō-ryū in 1447

Iizasa Ienao (飯篠 長威斎 家直 Iizasa Chōi-sai Ienao, c. 1387 – c. 1488) was a respected spearman and swordsman whose daimyō was deposed, which encouraged him to relinquish control of his household to conduct purification rituals and study martial arts in isolation.

Iizasa was born in the village of Iizasa in Shimōsa Province. When he was young, he moved to the vicinity of the famous Katori Shrine, northeast of Tokyo in modern-day Chiba Prefecture. The shrine's kami, Futsunushi (経津主神 (Futsunushi no kami)) is revered as a spirit of swordsmanship and martial arts.

=== Headmasters ===
In 1896, the 18th sōke died without a male heir. Shihan Yamaguchi Eikan governed the school until his death on 14 March 1917. Until Iizasa Kinjiro married into the Iizasa household, the school was headed in order by nine instructors—Tamai Kisaburo, Shiina Ichizo, Ito Tanekichi, Kuboki Sazaemon, Isobe Kohei, Motomiya (Hongu) Toranosuke, Hayashi Yazaemon, Kamagata Minosuke, and the main instructor Yamaguchi.

=== Recent history ===
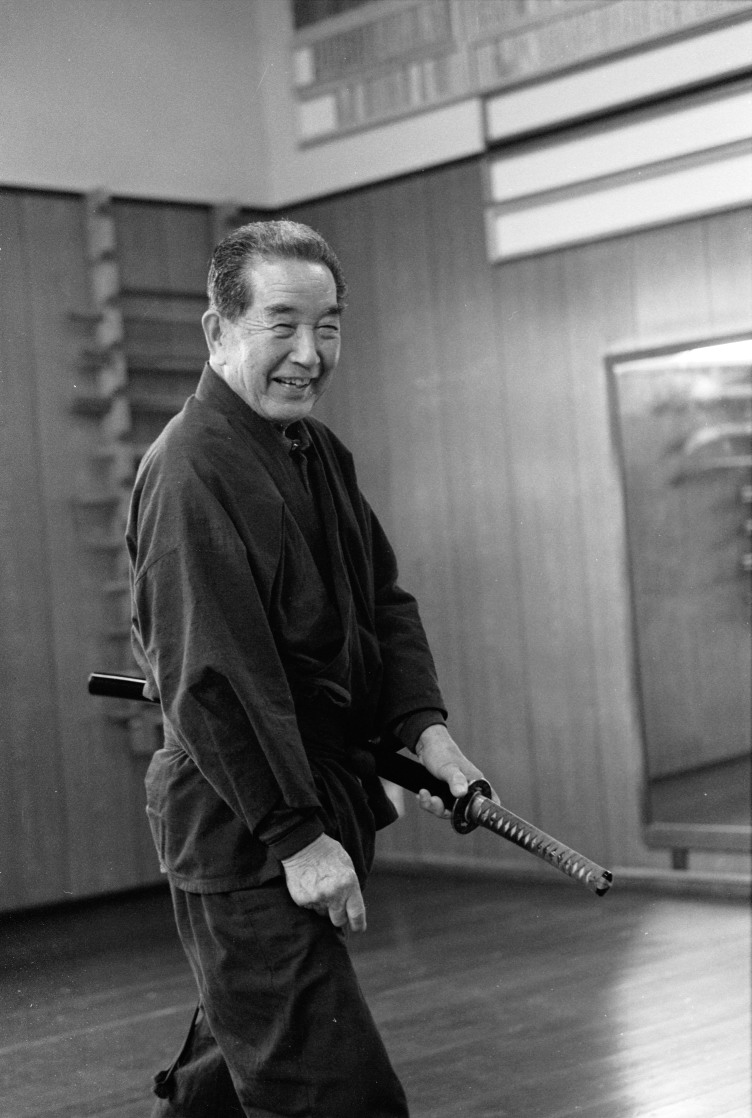
Risuke Otake (Pic. M. Stokhof 2007)

On 6 March 1960, the school received the first ever "Intangible Cultural Asset" designation given to a martial art by the Japanese government, naming Hayashi Yazaemon, Ōtake Risuke, and Iizasa Yasusada as its guardians. The Iizasa family dojo was also designated a Cultural Asset. The designation of Cultural Asset status shifted to the Chiba Prefectural Government in 1985 and the art was recertified, again naming Ōtake Risuke and Iizasa Yasusada as guardians. Ōtake Nobutoshi and Kyōsō Shigetoshi were also certified as guardians on 30 March 2004.

Iizasa Yasusada has publicly recognised the Otake and Sugino dojo. Both dojo represent the school annually at the Meiji Jingu embu.

Kyōsō Shigetoshi was appointed shihan in September 2017, and Ōtake Nobutoshi was issued hamon (excommunicated) on 9 December 2018. However, both Otake Risuke, Otake Nobutoshi and Kyōsō Shigetoshi are still recognised as guardians of the school, by the Chiba Prefecture Board of Cultural Affairs.

=== Gallery ===
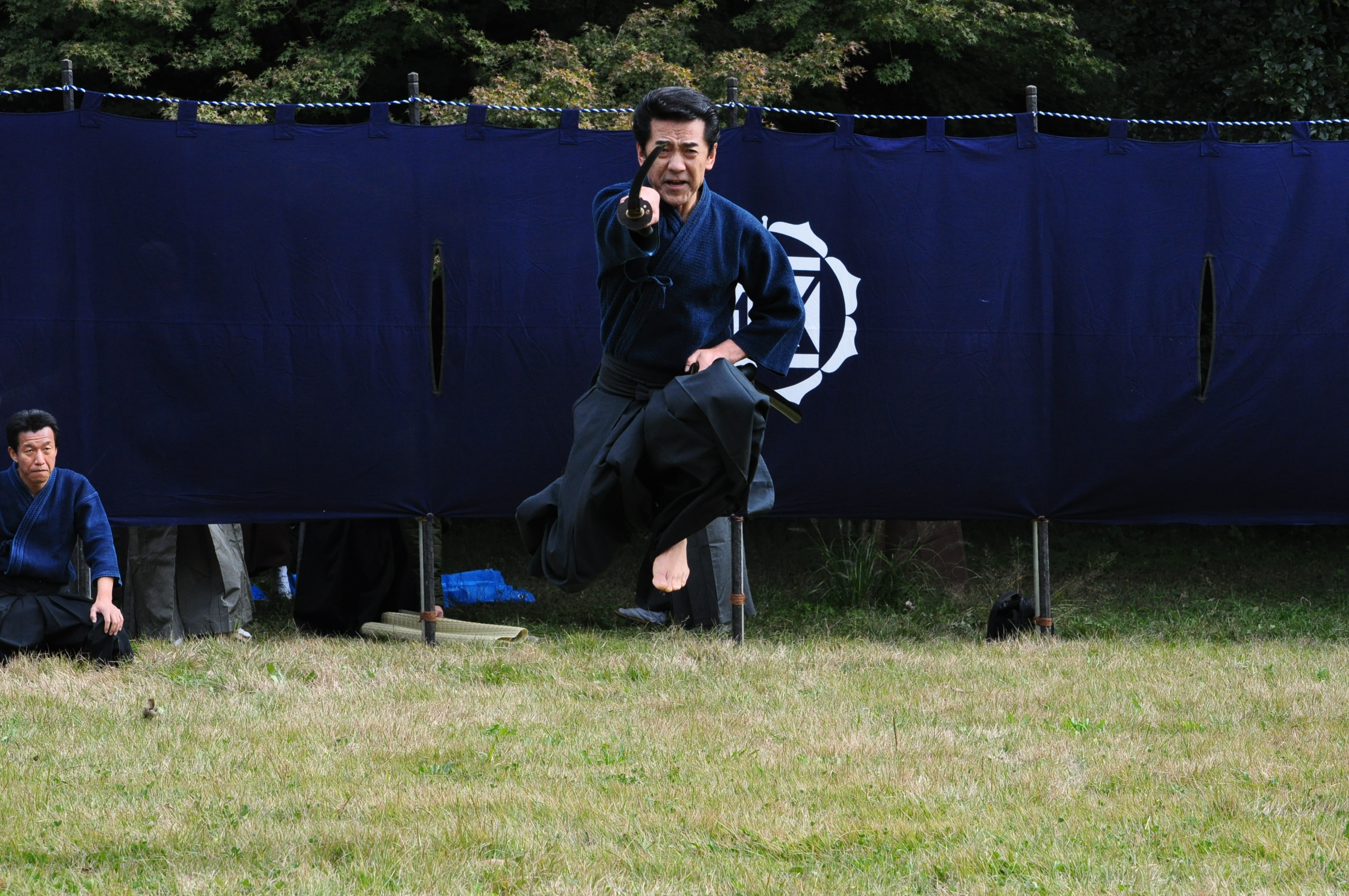
Meiji Shrine annual festival dedication Tenshin Shoden Katori Shinto Ryu (3 November 2011)

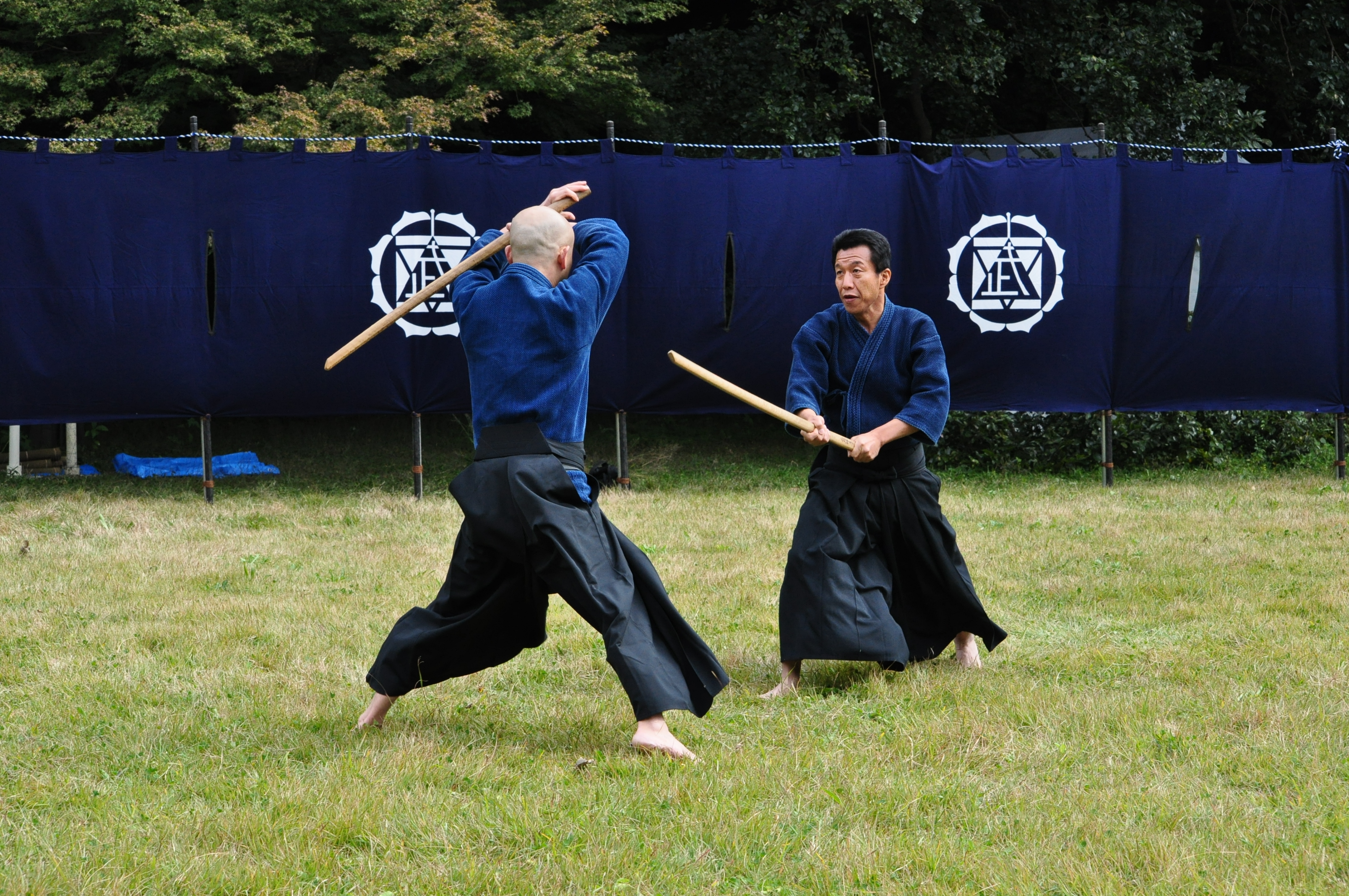
Same as left, Tenshin Shoden Katori Shinto Ryu (3 November 2011)

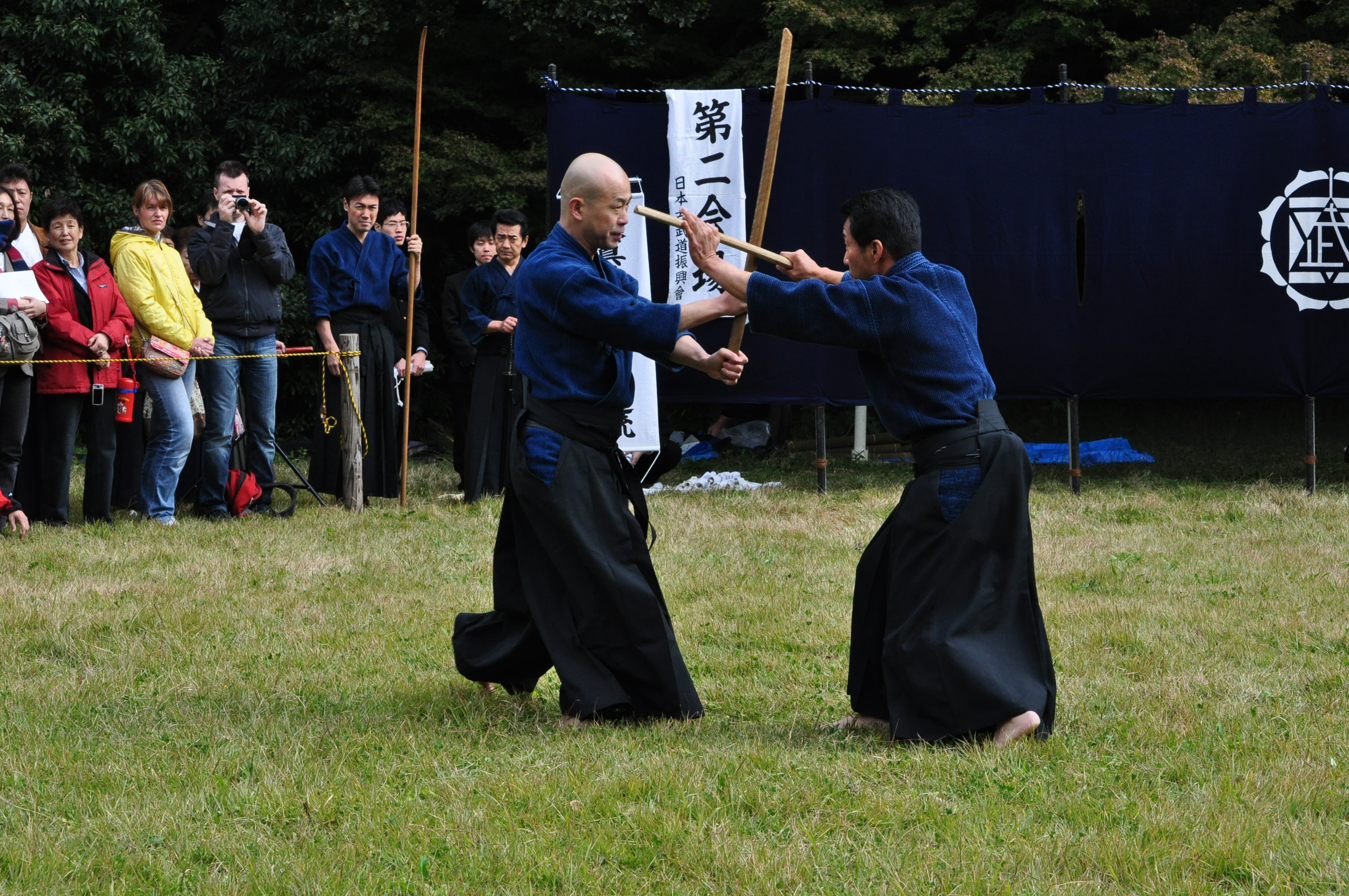
Same as left, Tenshin Shoden Katori Shinto Ryu (3 November 2011)

== Curriculum ==
The Tenshin Shōden Katori Shintō-ryū is a comprehensive martial system. Unlike modern martial arts such as kendo or iaido, which concentrate on one specific area of training, a broad range of martial skills is studied.

The main emphasis of the school is kenjutsu. A wide range of other weapons are taught as part of the curriculum, but the sword remains the central weapon.

The primary curriculum includes:

Arts		Forms
Sword arts (tachijutsu)	Sword combat (kenjutsu)	4 Forms: Basics of the Sword (表之太刀, Omote no Tachi)
Sword arts (tachijutsu)	Sword combat (kenjutsu)	5 Forms: Five Teachings of the Sword (五行之太刀, Gogyō no Tachi)
Sword arts (tachijutsu)	Sword combat (kenjutsu)	3 Forms: Seven Essential Articles of the Sword (極意七条之太刀, Gokui Shichijo no Tachi)
Sword arts (tachijutsu)	Sword drawing (battōjutsu)	6 Forms: Basics of Sword-Drawing (表之居合, Omote-no Iai)
Sword arts (tachijutsu)	Sword drawing (battōjutsu)	5 Forms: Standing Sword-Drawing (立合抜刀術, Tachiai Battōjutsu)
Sword arts (tachijutsu)	Sword drawing (battōjutsu)	5 Forms: Essentials of Sword Drawing (極意之居合, Gokui no Iai)
Sword arts (tachijutsu)	Two swords (両刀術 ryōtōjutsu)	4 Forms: Two Swords (両刀, Ryōtō)
Sword arts (tachijutsu)	Short sword (kodachi)	4 Forms: Essentials of the Short Sword (極意之小太刀, Gokui no Kodachi)
Staff art (bōjutsu)		6 Forms: Basics of the Staff (表之棒, Omote no Bō)
Staff art (bōjutsu)		6 Forms: Five Teachings of the Staff (五行之棒, Gogyō no Bō)
Glaive art (naginatajutsu)		4 Forms: Basics of the Glaive (表之長刀, Omote no Naginata)
Glaive art (naginatajutsu)		3 Forms: Seven Essential Articles of the Glaive (極意七条之長刀, Gokui Shichijo no Naginata)
Spear art (sōjutsu)		6 Forms: Basics of the Spear (表之槍, Omote no Yari)
Spear art (sōjutsu)		2 Forms: Secret forms (Hiden no Yari)
Spike-throwing (shurikenjutsu)		7 Forms: Basics of Spike Throwing (表之手裏剣, Omote no Shuriken)
Spike-throwing (shurikenjutsu)		8 Forms: Five Teachings of Spike Throwing (五行之手裏剣, Gogyō no Shuriken)
Spike-throwing (shurikenjutsu)		9 Forms: Essentials of Spike Throwing (極意之手裏剣, Gokui no Shuriken)
Jujutsu		36 Forms: Essentials of Jujutsu (極意之柔術, Gokui no Jūjutsu)

The Gogyo and Gokui kata are only taught to advanced practitioners after years of fundamental practice.

Other, more advanced areas of study of the school include:

- Ninjutsu (intelligence gathering and analysis)
- Chikujojutsu (field fortification art)
- Gunbai-Heihō (strategy and tactics)
- Tenmon Chirigaku (Chinese astrology and geomantic divination)
- In-Yo kigaku (philosophical and mystical aspects derived from Mikkyō, specifically Shingon Buddhism)

== Keppan ==
Historically, before beginning any training in Tenshin Shōden Katori Shintō-ryū, every prospective pupil had to swear an oath of allegiance to the school. The method was to make keppan (blood oath) in support of the following kisho or kishomon (pledge). This oath was a written one with the prospective member being required to sign his name in his own blood. The applicant would prick or cut a finger or sometimes the inner arm and with the blood drawn, sign the following pledge:

On becoming a member of the Tenshin Shōden Katori Shintō-ryū which has been transmitted by the Great Deity of the Katori Shrine, I herewith affirm my pledge that:

1. I will not have the impertinence to discuss or demonstrate details of the ryū to either non-members or members, even if they are relatives;
2. I will not engage in altercations or misuse the art against others;
3. I will never engage in any kind of gambling nor frequent disreputable places.
4. I will not cross swords with any followers of other martial traditions without authorization.

I hereby pledge to firmly adhere to each of the above articles. Should I break any of these articles I will submit to the punishment of the Great Deity of Katori and the Great Deity Marishiten. Herewith I solemnly swear and affix my blood seal to this oath to these Great Deities.

== Branches ==
Tenshin Shōden Katori Shintō-ryū is currently represented by the Kyōsō Shibu led by Kyōsō Shigetoshi, Ōtake Risuke's younger son. The honbu dojo is located at Iizasa Yasusada's home near the Katori shrine and is used by branches in good standing on special occasions. The Kyōsō Shibu regularly trains out of the Shisui Town Community Plaza and the Matsuyamashita Koen Sports Gymnasium in Inzai City. Several branches have existed alongside or split from the mainline with varying ties to the Iizasa family, such as Noda, Yoseikan, Shinbukan, Sugino, Hatakeyama, Sugawara.

== Ranking and appointed positions ==
The different branches recognize different levels of ranks and appointments. The traditional ranks are a variant of the menkyo system.

=== Ōtake ===
==== Ranks ====
- Mokuroku (目録, "catalog")
- Menkyo (免許, "license, certificate")
- Gokui Kaiden (極意皆伝, "deepest transmission")

==== Appointments ====
- Shidōsha (指導者, "mentor, coach"; given as license to teach outside of Shinbukan dojo)
- Shihan (師範, 'instructor'; head-teacher)

=== Sugino Dojo ===
The Sugino line uses the modern dan system, out of respect for Yoshio Sugino's (10th dan) judo teacher Kanō Jigorō, who was a pioneer of the dan-i ranking system. Sugino dojo members also receive densho/makimono.

=== Hatakeyama-ha ===
The Hatakeyama line (which has no current headmaster) uses the modern dan system alongside the traditional menkyo system, issuing ranks in both with shōden/chūden/okuden gradations to create equivalent ranks from the menkyo system.

==== Ranks ====
- 1st dan – kirikami shōden
- 2nd dan – kirikami chūden
- 3rd dan – mokuroku shōden
- 4th dan – mokuroku chūden
- 5th dan – menkyo mokuroku
- 6th dan – menkyo chūden
- 7th dan – menkyo okuden
- 8th dan – menkyo kaiden

=== Sugawara-ha ===
Sugawara Sogo Budo issues mokuroku and menkyo certifications. The highest level is menkyo kaiden. English-speaking members of Sugawara Budo refer to the rank of menkyo as a "kyōshi license" or menkyo kyōshi.

=== Noda-ha ===
Noda Shinzan (1848–1917) began training in Katori Shintō-ryū in 1853 under Yamada Naomune, a retainer of the Date clan. Many Date retainers had trained in Katori Shintō-ryū and developed their own distinctive style. After Naomune's death in 1912, Shinzan enrolled his grandson, Seizan, under Yamaguchi Kumajiro, the most senior mainline shihan at the time. Following the deaths of Yamaguchi and his grandfather, Noda Seizan continued to train under Motomiya Toranosuke. After Motomiya's passing, Noda studied with Hayashi Yazaemon who began reforming and standardizing the mainline curriculum. Finding his style incompatible with Hayashi's, Noda Seizan quietly withdrew to private teaching, referring to his branch as Noda-ha Katori Shintō-ryū. Noda-ha preserves some kata that have been lost in the mainline.

=== Ichigidō ===
Shiigi Munenori began training in Katori Shintō-ryū under his father, who had trained with Motomiya Toranosuke, before formally training at Ōtake Risuke's dojo for over thirty years. He incorporates Katori Shintō-ryū as part of the curriculum of his Ichigidō organization and maintains a positive relationship with the Iizasa family. He writes "Tenshin Shōden Katori Shintō-ryū" as "天真正伝香取神刀流" using '刀' (sword) in place of '道' (way).

=== Yoseikan Budo ===
Mochizuki Minoru, a 8th dan judoka from the Kodokan and 10th dan aikidoka under Ueshiba Morihei, trained alongside Sugino Yoshio, and incorporated Katori Shintō-ryū into the curriculum of Budo Yoseikan. His son, Mochizuki Hiro, founded Yoseikan Budo.

== Notable practitioners ==
- Yamazaki Susumu
