= Futsunushi =

Japanese kami of swords

- God of War, Lightning, Swords, Fire and Martial Arts
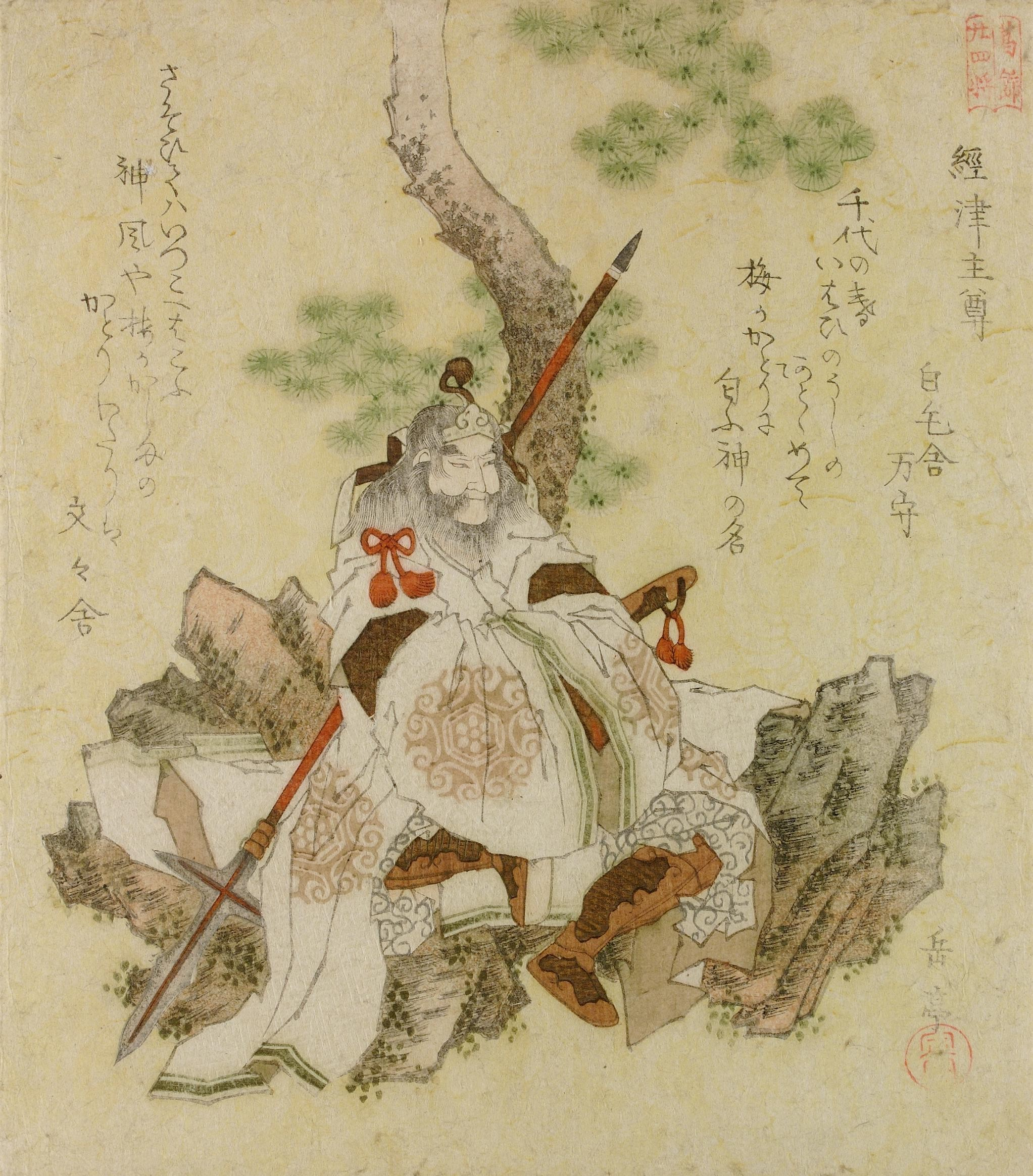
- Surimono of Futsunushi, from the series "Twenty-Four Generals for the Katsushika Circle" (Katsushika nijûshishô), by Yashima Gakutei
- Other names: Futsunushi-no-Mikoto (布都怒志命, 布都努志命); Iwainushi-no-Kami (斎主神, 伊波比主神); Katori Daimyōjin (香取大明神); Katori-no-Kami (香取神); Katori-no-Ōkami (香取大神)
- Japanese: 経津主神
- Major cult center: Katori Shrine, Kasuga Grand Shrine
- Texts: Nihon Shoki, Izumo Fudoki, Hitachi Fudoki, Kogo Shūi, Sendai Kuji Hongi

Genealogy
- Parents: Iwatsutsunoo and Iwatsutsunome
- Siblings: Takemikazuchi
- Children: Ame-no-Naemasu-no-Mikoto

Futsunushi (経津主神, Futsunushi-no-Kami; also 布都怒志命 or 布都努志命, Futsunushi-no-Mikoto), also known as Iwainushi (斎主神 or 伊波比主神, Iwainushi-no-Kami), is a warrior god in Japanese mythology. Also known under the epithet Katori Daimyōjin (香取大明神) after his shrine in northern Chiba Prefecture (historical Shimōsa Province), Katori Jingū, he is often revered alongside Takemikazuchi (the god of Kashima Shrine), with whom he is closely associated (his brother). He is the general of Amaterasu and regarded as a legendary ancestor of the Mononobe clan, and like Takemikazuchi is one of the tutelary deities of the Fujiwara clan.

== Name ==
One theory interprets the futsu (Old Japanese: putu) in Futsunushi's name as an onomatopoeic sound of a sword swinging and cutting something. A connection with the term furu ('to shake') has also been proposed.

Nushi (OJ: nusi), meaning 'master' or 'ruler', is derived from a contraction of the possessive particle no and ushi (OJ: usi), of the same meaning.

The name Iwainushi (historical orthography: いはひぬし, Ihahinushi; OJ: Ipapinusi) meanwhile is a contraction of iwai no ushi (斎之大人), 'master of worship'.

== Mythology ==
=== Parentage ===
A variant account of Izanagi and Izanami's begetting of various gods (kamiumi) cited in the Nihon Shoki states that when Izanagi killed the newborn fire god Kagutsuchi (whose birth caused the death of his wife Izanami), the drops of blood from his sword congealed to form the rocks by the heavenly river (天の安河, ame no yasukawa) from which Futsunushi was born. The blood which dripped from the sword's hilt ring then turned into two gods named Mikahayahi-no-Kami (甕速日神) and Hihayahi-no-Kami (樋速日神); Mikahayahi is here identified as Takemikazuchi's parent. Another variant meanwhile states that Kagutsuchi's blood spurted out and transformed into two gods named Iwasaku-no-Kami (磐裂神) and Nesaku-no-Kami (根裂神). Their children, the male Iwatsutsunoo-no-Kami (磐筒男神) and the female Iwatsutsunome-no-Kami (磐筒女神), begat Futsunushi. This is the version followed in the main narrative of the work's second volume. Likewise the Kogo Shūi identifies Futsunushi as the son of Iwatsutsunome.

=== Subjugation of the land ===
==== Nihon Shoki ====
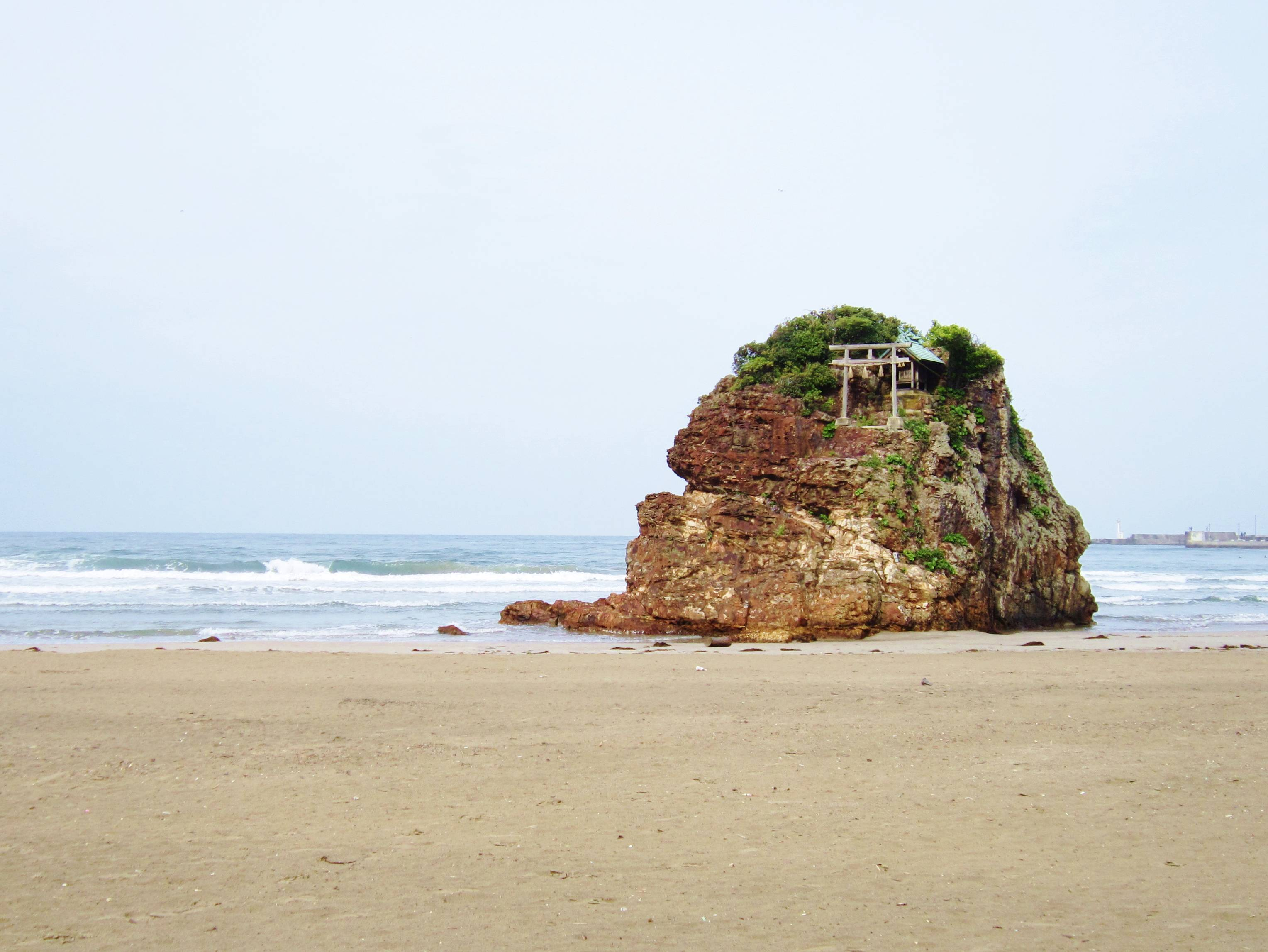
Inasa Beach (稲佐の浜 Inasa-no-hama) in Izumo, Shimane Prefecture

Both Futsunushi and Takemikazuchi are closely associated with the 'transfer of the land' (kuni-yuzuri) myth cycle, which relates how the deities of Takamagahara (the 'Plain of High Heaven') sent various messengers down to earth, to Ashihara-no-Nakatsukuni (the 'Central Land of Reed-Plains,' i.e. the land of Japan), in order to demand that its inhabitants submit to their rule.

The main narrative of the second volume of the Nihon Shoki relates that after the failure of the earlier messengers, Ame-no-Hohi and Ame-no-Wakahiko, to perform their mission, the gods of heaven headed by the primordial deity Takamimusubi decide to send Futsunushi, the son of Iwatsutsuno'o and Iwatsutsunome, as their new emissary. Hearing this, the god Takemikazuchi - here identified as the son of Hihayahi - indignantly protests that he is also a stalwart warrior (masurao) like Futsunushi; the gods then agreed to assign him as Futsunushi's companion. The two then make their way to the shores of Itasa (五十田狹之小汀, Itasa no ohama) in the land of Izumo, demanding that the earthly deity Ōnamuchi (Ōkuninushi), the ruler of Ashihara-no-Nakatsukuni, relinquish his authority. At the counsel of his son, Kotoshironushi, Ōnamuchi agrees to cede the land and withdraws into invisibility. After this, Futsunushi and Takemikazuchi proceeded to slay all those who refused to submit to them. A variant account adds that the two finally dispatched the god of weaving, Takehazuchi-no-Mikoto (建葉槌命), to subdue the last remaining rebel, the star god Kagaseo (香香背男). With all resistance gone, the two gods went back to heaven to report the success of their mission.

A variant account has Futsunushi and Takemikazuchi putting to death the evil deity Amatsumikaboshi (Kagaseo) in heaven first before they descend to Izumo. The account adds that it was at this time that Iwainushi-no-Kami (possibly another name for Futsunushi), the deity enshrined in Katori, received the epithet iwai no ushi, 'master of worship.' In this version, Ōnamuchi initially refuses the demand of the two envoys. After Futsunushi goes back to Takamagahara to report, Takamimusubi sends him back to Ōnamuchi, this time with promises of rewards should he comply. Ōnamuchi finally accepts their terms and appoints the god of roads and borders, the funato no kami (岐神) as his replacement. He then finally disappears into the unseen world. Futsunushi, with the funato no kami as his guide, then makes his way around Ashihara-no-Nakatsukuni, killing those who resisted him and rewarding those who submitted.

==== Other texts ====
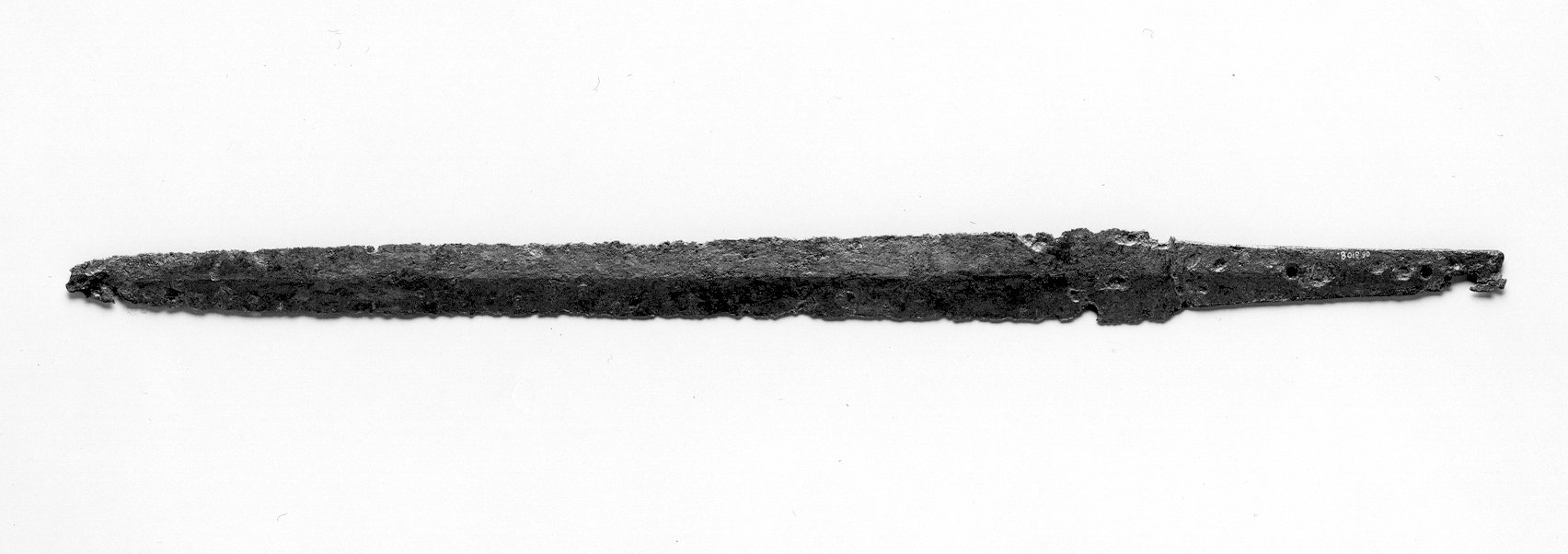
A double-edged straight sword (tsurugi) from the Kofun period (5th century)

Two legends from Ou District (意宇郡) of Izumo Province (modern Yasugi, Shimane Prefecture) recorded in the Izumo Fudoki feature Futsunushi.

Township of Tatenuhi. It is 10.7 miles northeast of the district office. At this place Futsunushi stitched up a rip in his sturdy shield of heaven. Thus it was named Tatenuhi, meaning "shield fastening."

Township of Yamakuni. It is 10.9 miles southeast of the district office. Futsunushi came to this place during a campaign. He said, "This is the land I wish to behold forever." Because of this the place is called Yamakuni, meaning "land to behold forever."

The Fudoki of Hitachi Province (modern Ibaraki Prefecture) also refers to a deity named 'Futsu-no-Ōkami' (普都大神) who is often identified with Futsunushi.

District of Shida. . . . An elder reports that at the beginning of Heaven and Earth, when the vegetal world was speaking words, a kami came from Heaven. Its name is the Great kami Futsu. In its rounds of the Central Plain of Reeds [Japan], it pacified various rebels. Once this Great kami had accomplished its work of civilization, it conceived in its heart the desire to return to its celestial abode. It therefore left its weapons and gear on earth, and, mounting a white cloud, returned to Heaven.

The kuni-yuzuri myth featured in the Izumo no Kuni no Miyatsuko no Kanʼyogoto (出雲国造神賀詞 "Congratulatory Words of the Chieftain of Izumo"), a ritual declaration (norito) delivered by the province's governor or kuni no miyatsuko at the imperial court upon his appointment, has Futsunushi being dispatched with the deity Ame-no-Hinadori-no-Mikoto (天夷鳥命), the son of Ame-no-Oshihomimi, son of the sun goddess Amaterasu and the Izumo magnate clan's divine ancestor.

Futsunushi is absent in the Kojiki, where the envoys sent by the heavenly kami are Takemikazuchi and the bird-boat deity Ame-no-Torifune. The Kojiki's kamiumi myth identifies Takemikazuchi - here given the aliases 'Takefutsu-no-Kami' (建布都神) and 'Toyofutsu-no-Kami' (豊布都神) - as one of three gods born from the blood that fell from the blade of Izanagi's sword (the other two being Mikahayahi and Hihayahi), although the kuni-yuzuri portion refers to him as the son of the deified sword itself, there given the name Itsu-no-Ohabari (伊都尾羽張).

=== The Sobataka deity ===
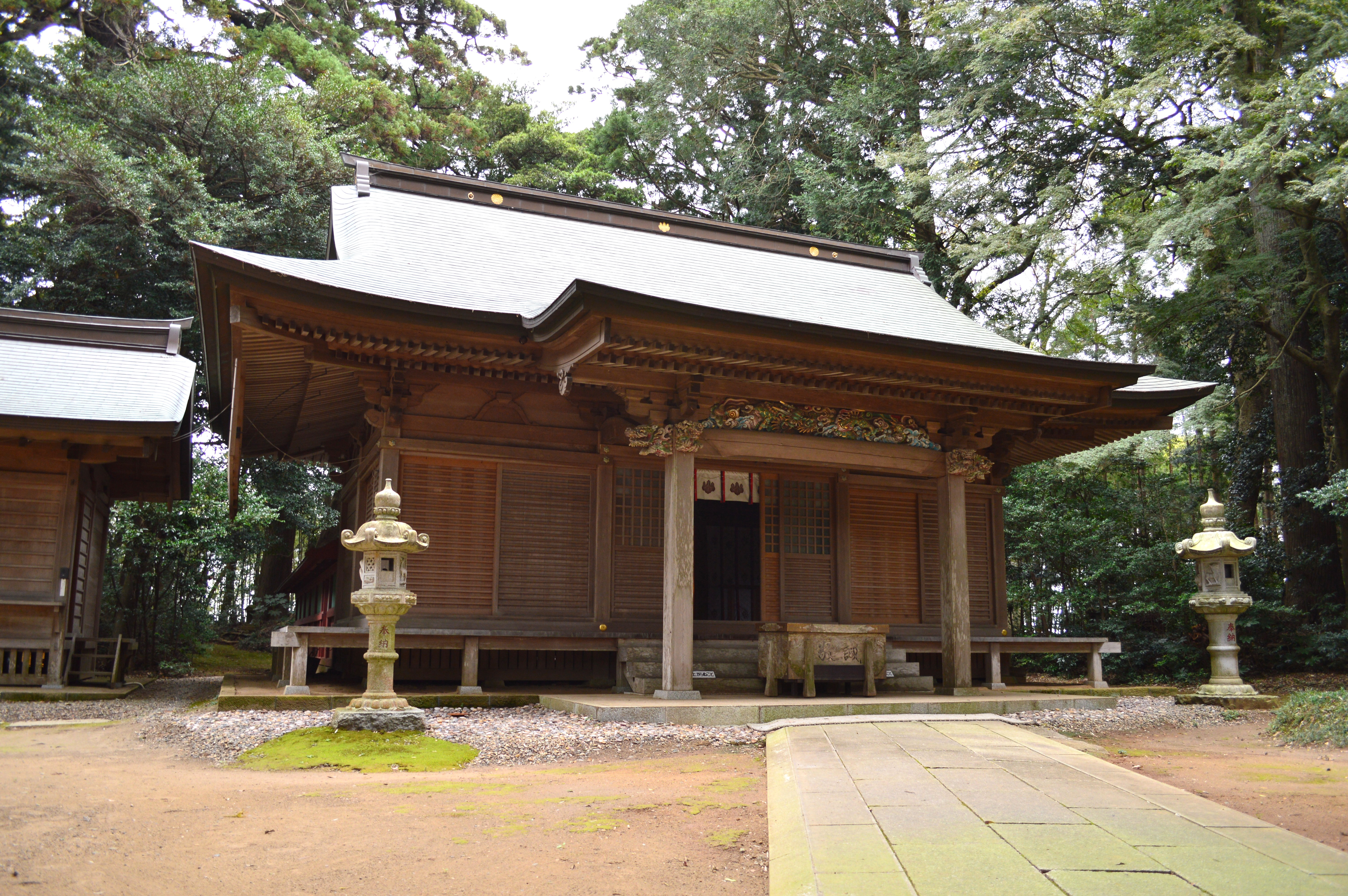
Sobataka Shrine (Ōkura, Katori, Chiba Prefecture)

Sobataka Shrine (側高神社) in Ōkura, Katori is reckoned as the first and most important auxiliary shrine of Katori Jingū. Its deity, whose identity is kept secret since antiquity and thus is known merely as the 'Great Deity of Sobataka' (側高大神 Sobataka-no-Ōkami), is the subject of a legend involving the god of Katori Shrine.

The story relates that the Sobataka deity, acting under the orders of the god of Katori, raided the land of Mutsu and stole 2,000 horses from the local kami. When the god of Mutsu gave chase, the Sobataka deity drained Lake Kasumigaura using a 'tide-ebbing jewel' (干珠 kanju), allowing the horses to cross over to the other shore. After the horses have safely crossed, the Sobataka deity then used a 'tide-flowing jewel' (満珠 manju), to restore the lake to normal, trapping the pursuer in an island in the middle of the lake known as Ukishima (浮島 'floating island', part of modern Inashiki, Ibaraki Prefecture).

== Offspring ==
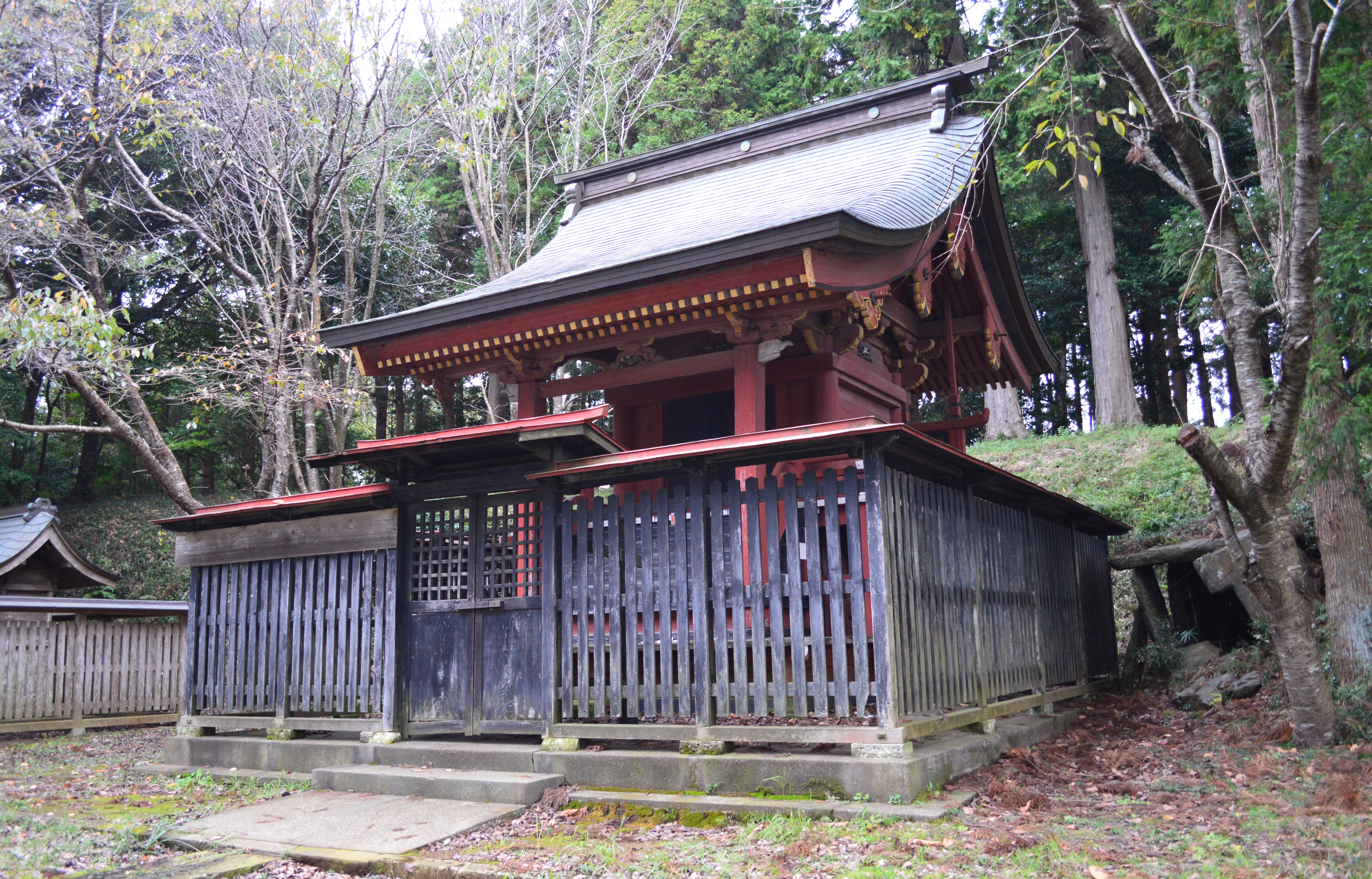
Matami Shrine (Katori, Chiba Prefecture)

The deity Ame-no-Naemasu-no-Mikoto (天苗加命), worshiped in Matami Shrine (又見神社) in Katori, is considered to be Futsunushi's son. Ame-no-Naemasu is reckoned as the ancestor of the Katori clan (香取氏), which traditionally served as priests in Katori Shrine. The Katori later assumed the name 'Ōnakatomi' (大中臣) after a grandson of Ōnakatomi no Kiyomaro, of the influential Nakatomi (Ōnakatomi) clan, was adopted into the clan.

== Worship ==
=== Shrines ===
As the deity of Katori Jingū, Futsunushi also serves as the deity of shrines belonging to the Katori shrine network (香取神社 Katori Jinja). In addition, Futsunushi is also enshrined in Kasuga Grand Shrine alongside Takemikazuchi, Ame-no-Koyane (the divine ancestor of the Nakatomi and Fujiwara clans), and Himegami, in Shiogama Shrine (塩竈神社 Shiogama Jinja) in Miyagi Prefecture alongside Takemikazuchi and Shiotsuchi-no-Oji (the kami of salt making), in Nukisaki Shrine (貫前神社 Nukisaki Jinja) in Tomioka, Gunma Prefecture alongside a goddess known only under the generic epithet 'Hime Ōkami' (比売大神), and as an auxiliary deity in Chiba Shrine in Chiba City. A number of other shrines throughout the country also enshrine Futsunushi in an auxiliary capacity.

=== As patron of martial arts ===
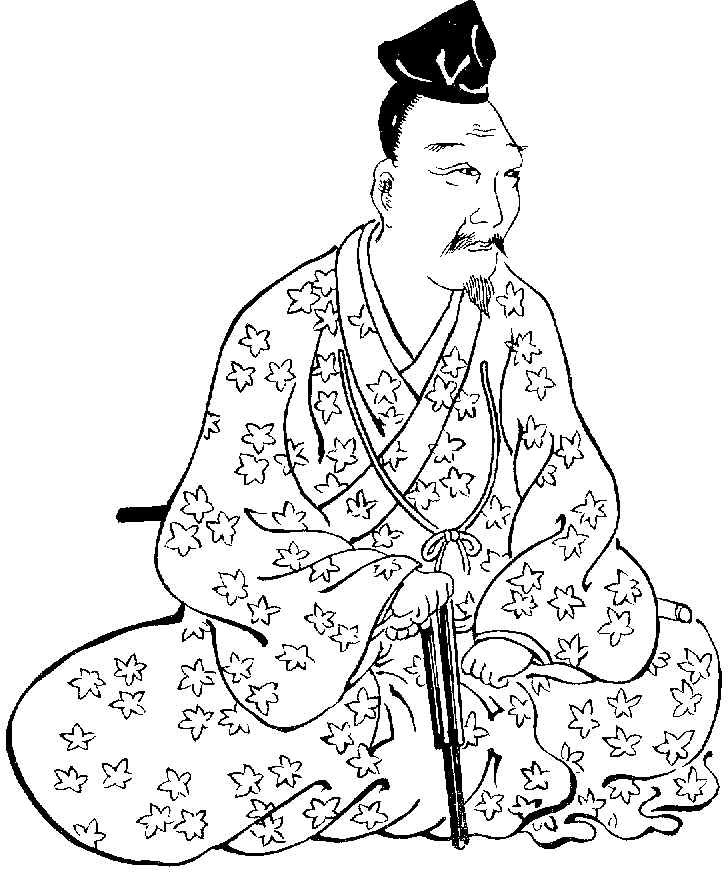
Iizasa Chōisai Ienao

Both Futsunushi and Takemikazuchi were reckoned as eminent war gods (軍神 ikusagami, gunjin) since antiquity. The Ryōjin Hishō compiled in 1179 (the late Heian period) attest to the worship of the gods of Katori and Kashima as martial deities at the time of its compilation:

These gods of war live east of the barrier: (Note: During the Heian period, the expression 'east of the barrier' (関の東 seki-no-hi(n)gashi, whence derives the term 関東 Kantō) referred to the provinces beyond the checkpoints or barrier stations (関 seki) at the eastern fringes of the capital region, more specifically the land east of the checkpoint at Ōsaka/Ausaka Hill (逢坂 'hill of meeting', old orthography: Afusaka; not to be confused with the modern city of Osaka) in modern Ōtsu, Shiga Prefecture. By the Edo period, Kantō was reinterpreted to mean the region east of the checkpoint in Hakone, Kanagawa Prefecture.)
Kashima, Katori, Suwa no Miya, and Hira Myōjin;
also Su in Awa, Otaka Myōjin in Tai no Kuchi,
Yatsurugi in Atsuta, and Tado no Miya in Ise.

— Ryōjin Hishō, song 258

The two kami have been worshiped by many eminent swordsmen such as Iizasa Chōisai, the founder of Tenshin Shōden Katori Shintō-ryū, and Tsukahara Bokuden, the founder of Kashima Shintō-ryū. Indeed, Chōisai was reputed in legend to have developed his swordsmanship style after being taught secrets of strategy by Futsunushi in a dream. Even today, many kendo dōjō in Japan enshrine either or both of these deities.

=== Under shinbutsu-shūgō ===
A collection of medieval legends, the Shintōshū, identifies the Katori deity as a manifestation of the eleven-faced form of the bodhisattva Avalokiteśvara (Kannon).

== See also ==
- Isonokami Shrine
- Kasuga-taisha
- Katori Shrine
- Kuni-yuzuri
- Mononobe clan
- Nakatomi clan
- Takemikazuchi
- Tenshin Shōden Katori Shintō-ryū
