= Amatsu-Mikaboshi =

Originally a malevolent Shinto god

Amatsu-Mikaboshi (天津甕星), also called Ame-no-Kagaseo (天香香背男) or Hoshi-no-Kami Kagaseo (星神香香背男), is a god of stars who appears in Japanese mythology. No reference to Mikaboshi is made in the Kojiki; however, he plays a minor role in the Nihon Shoki as a deity insubordinate to the amatsukami during the latter's subjugation of the land.

== Name ==
The deity is referred to as both Ama-tsu-mika-hoshi (天津甕星; "August Star of Heaven" or "Dread Star of Heaven") and Ama-no-kagase-o (天香香背男; "Brilliant Male of Heaven" or "Scarecrow Male of Heaven") in the Nihon Shoki. With the name Kagaseo theorized to come from the word kagayaku (輝く; "to shine").

Furthermore, the component mika (written using the kanji 甕; "earthenware pot"), from Mikaboshi, is interpreted as being derived from ika (厳; "imposing" or "austere"), which prompted the kokugaku scholar Hirata Atsutane to identify Amatsu-Mikaboshi with the planet Venus.

== Mythology ==
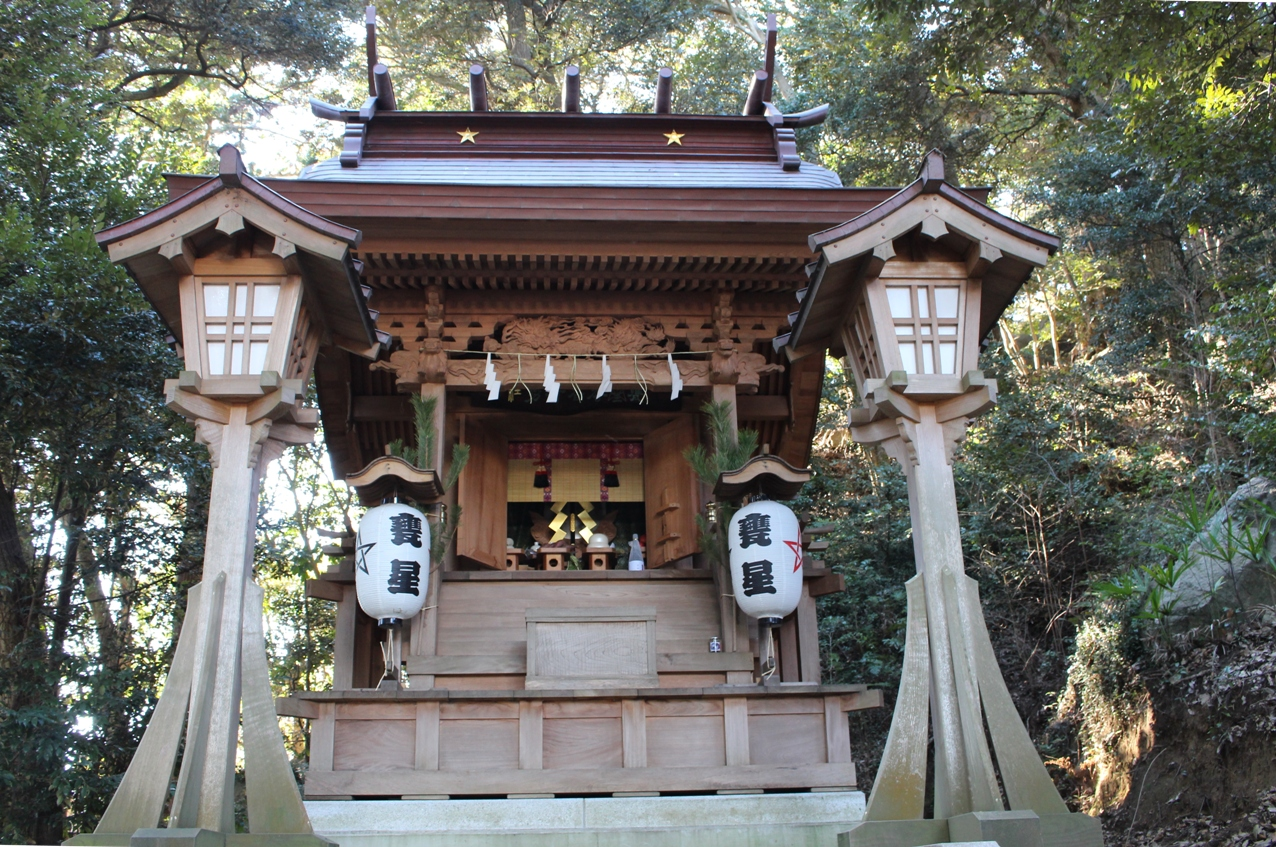
The Mikaboshi-Kagaseo Shrine (甕星香々背男社) at Ōmika Shrine (Hitachi City, Ibaraki).

In the Nihon Shoki, during the amatsukami's conquest of the Central Land of Reed-Plains, Mikaboshi (referred to as Kagaseo) is mentioned in passing as a rebellious kunitsukami who is subdued by Takehazuchi at the behest of Takemikazuchi and Futsunushi:

The two Gods at length put to death the malignant Deities and the tribes of herbs, trees and rocks. When all had been subdued, the only one who refused submission was the Star-God Kagaseo (星神香香背男, Hoshi-no-Kami Kagase-o). Therefore they sent the Weaver-God Takehazuchi-no-Mikoto (倭文神建葉槌命, Shitorigami Take-ha-dzuchi-no-Mikoto) also, upon which he rendered submission. The two Gods therefore ascended to Heaven.

A second account provided in the Nihon Shoki instead presents Mikaboshi as an amatsukami, who is slain by Takemikazuchi and Futsunushi before their descent to earth:

The Heavenly Deity sent Futsunushi-no-Kami and Takemikazuchi-no-Kami to tranquillize the Central Land of Reed-Plains (葦原中国, Ashihara-no-Naka-tsu-kuni). Now these two Gods said: "In Heaven there is an Evil Deity (悪しき神, Ashiki-gami) called Amatsu-Mikaboshi, or Ame-no-Kagaseo. We pray that this Deity may be executed before we go down to make clear the Central Land of Reed-Plains."

These are virtually the only passages in the Kojiki and Nihon Shoki that deal with a kami of stars, and, uniquely, present the deity as antagonistic towards the amatsukami.

== Worship ==
The Ōmika Shrine in Hitachi (Ibaraki Prefecture) enshrines Mikaboshi-Kagaseo (甕星香々背男) as a jinushigami alongside Takehazuchi-no-Mikoto (武葉槌命). Additionally, a "spirit-housing stone" (宿魂石, Shukukonseki) within the shrine's precincts is believed to contain Mikaboshi's ara-mitama.

Mikaboshi is also enshrined at various Hoshi-Jinja (星神社; "star shrine") and Hoshimiya-Jinja (星宮神社; "star palace shrine") throughout Japan.

== In popular culture ==
Amatsu-Mikaboshi, the Chaos King, is a fictional character appearing in American comic books published by Marvel Comics.

The Mikaboshi (箕加星) are an ancient fictional sorcery clan appearing in Kagurabachi published by Weekly Shonen Jump.

== See also ==
- Futsunushi
- Kuni-yuzuri
- List of Japanese deities
- Takemikazuchi

== Bibliography ==
- Aston, William George (1896). Nihongi: chronicles of Japan from the earliest times to A.D. 697. Vol. 1. Kegan Paul, Trench, Trübner & Co.
- Aston, William George (1905). Shinto, the Way of the Gods. Longmans, Green, and co.
- Coulter, Charles Russell (2013). Encyclopedia of Ancient Deities. Routledge. ISBN 9781135963972.
