= Risuke Otake =

Japanese martial artist (1926–2021)

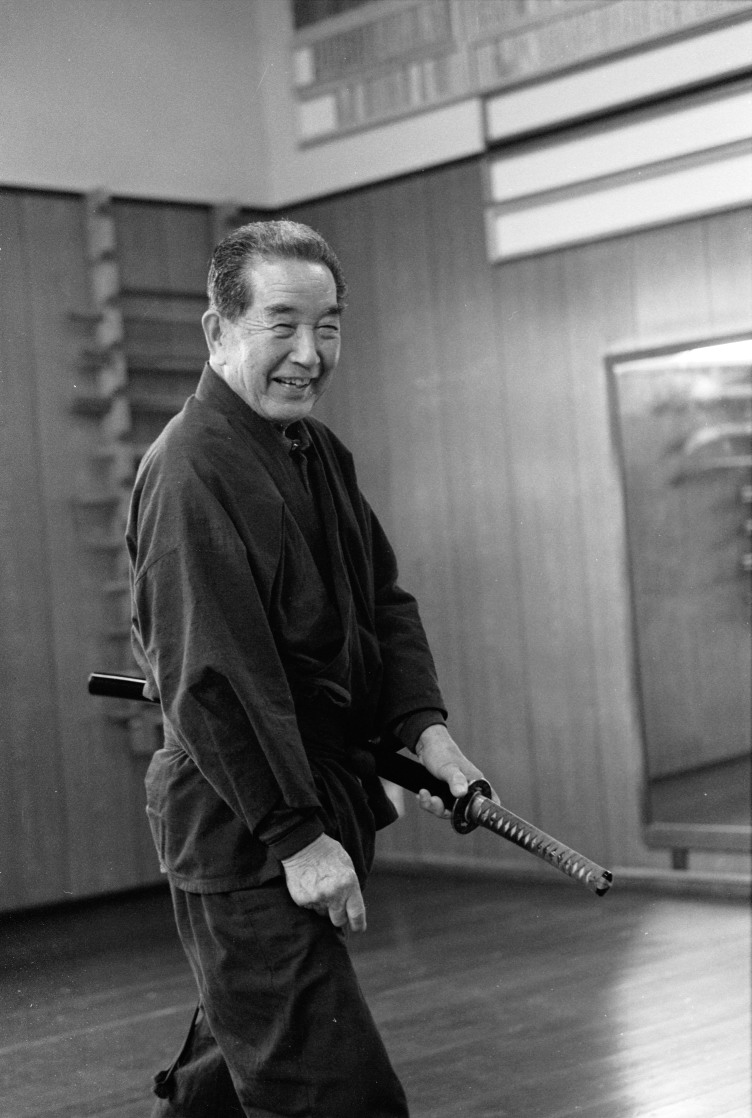
- Born: 10 March 1926
- Died: 7 June 2021 (aged 95)
- Style: Tenshin Shōden Katori Shintō-ryū

Risuke Ōtake (大竹利典, Otake Risuke) (10 March 1926 – 7 June 2021), full name Ōtake Risuke Minamoto no Takeyuki (大竹利典源健之, Ōtake Risuke Minamoto no Takeyuki), was a Japanese martial artist. He was a long time shihan (Teaching Master) of Tenshin Shōden Katori Shintō-ryū bujutsu, which he learned as a disciple of the previous teaching master Hayashi Yazaemon (1892–1964) from the time he entered the school in 1942 at the age of 16. In 1967, when Otake-sensei was 42 years old, he received gokui kaiden, the highest level of attainment in the tradition, and at the same time became the school's teaching master. He lived and taught in rural location near Narita city, in Chiba Prefecture of Japan. The teachings of Tenshin Shōden Katori Shintō-ryū were designated an Intangible Cultural Asset of Chiba Prefecture in 1960, with Ōtake designated as guardian of the tradition.

He authored Strategy and the Art of Peace, as well as an earlier three-volume set of books on the tradition entitled The Deity and the Sword: Katori Shinto-ryu.

He was a member of the Chiba Prefecture Board of Registrars and Appraisers for Muskets and Swords; a position he held since 1979. Ōtake shihan died on 7 June 2021.

== Books by Risuke Ōtake ==
- Ōtake, Risuke (1977). The Deity and the Sword - Katori Shinto-ryu Vol. 1, Japan, Japan Publications Trading Co. ISBN 0-87040-378-8 (Original Japanese title for all three volumes in this series is Mukei Bunkazai Katori Shinto-ryu)
- Ōtake, Risuke (1977). The Deity and the Sword - Katori Shinto-ryu Vol. 2, Japan, Japan Publications Trading Co. ISBN 0-87040-405-9
- Ōtake, Risuke (1977). The Deity and the Sword - Katori Shinto-ryu Vol. 3, Japan, Japan Publications Trading Co. ISBN 0-87040-406-7
- Ōtake, Risuke (2007). Katori Shinto-ryu: Warrior Tradition, Koryu Books. ISBN 978-1-890536-20-6 (A total revamp of the earlier The Deity and the Sword book)
- Ōtake, Risuke. Le Sabre et le Divin, ISBN 978-2-908580-82-2
- Ōtake, Risuke. (2016) Strategy and the Art of Peace, Tenshinshō-den Katori Shintō-ryū, Nippon Budokan, ISBN 978-4-583-10984-8 C0075

== Documentaries ==
- BBC Documentary, The Way of the Warrior, BBC, 29 June 1983
- John Wate, Le katana, sabre de samouraï, Arte Doc, 2005
- Nihon No Ken Jutsu, Gakken, 30 January 2008, (ISBN 4-05-605068-6)
- "REAL SAMURAI" NHK World TV22 June 2014
- Eat Your Enemy (Scarabeefilms, 2005)
