= Toyama-ryū =

Japanese army sword training body

Toyama-ryū 戸山流 とやまりゅう
- Date founded: 1925
- Country of origin: Japan
- Founder: Committee
- Arts taught: Iaido
- Descendant schools: Morinaga-ha, Nakamura-ha, Yamaguchi-ha

Toyama-ryū (戸山流) was established in 1925 by a committee of senior experts of several sword traditions for the curriculum of the Rikugun Toyama Gakkō.

The special school for training army personnel founded in 1873, called Rikugun Toyama Gakkō or "Toyama Army Academy" in Toyama, Tokyo, Japan, led to the establishment of Toyama-ryu. Today, separate lines of Toyama-ryū are primarily located in the Kantō, Tokai and Kansai region of Japan.

== Background ==
After the Meiji Restoration, officers in the Japanese Army were required to carry Western-style sabres. During the 1920s Japan went through a phase of militant nationalism that lasted until defeat in the Second World War. By adopting the katana, the traditional sword of the samurai, the Japanese were allying themselves with the samurai military tradition. Adopting the katana also served to calm discontent among the more politicized sections of the army who had been outraged at mechanization (another lesson learned from World War I) which had de-emphasized the role of infantry and cavalry.

In 1925, since not all officers had sufficient background in kenjutsu to deploy these weapons in combat, a simplified form of sword technique was devised that emphasized the most essential points of drawing and cutting. Takano Sasaburo and Nakayama Hakudo were senior teachers at the academy. Academy director Lieutenant Colonel Morinaga Kiyoshi (森永清 中佐) selected 5 kata from Nakayama's Omori-ryu to serve as the basis of the "Gunto no Soho". The system was further refined by committee.

The army iai-battō kata differ from those of many koryū sword schools in that all techniques are practised from a standing position. Also, this modern ryū has a strong emphasis on tameshigiri, or "test-cutting."

At the end of World War II, the Toyama Military Academy became the U.S. Army's Camp Zama. Nonetheless, the military iai system was revived after 1952. By the 1970s, three separate organizations represented Toyama-ryū Iaido: in Hokkaidō, the Greater Japan Toyama Ryu Iaido Federation (established by Yamaguchi Yuuki); in Kansai (Kyoto-Osaka area), the Toyama Ryu Iaido Association (established by Morinaga Kiyoshi former Head Instructor of the Toyama Academy); and the All-Japan Toyama Ryu Iaido Federation (established by Nakamura Taizaburo). Each of these organizations was autonomous.

Today, there are many active instructors of Gunto no Soho and all three mainline Toyama-ryū schools (Morinaga-ha, Nakamura-ha and Yamaguchi-ha) inside and outside Japan, licensed by several organizations including the Zen Nihon Toyama-ryu Iaido Renmei (ZNTIR), the Toyama-ryu Iai-Batto Do Renmei (TIBDR), the International Battodo Federation (IBF), the Zen Nihon Battodo Renmei (ZNBDR), the International Shinkendo Federation, the United States Federation of Batto-do (USFBD) and the International Batto-Do Rengo-Kai.

In Europe, active instructors can be found in the Czech republic (Czech Toyama Ryu Federation), in Sweden, in Poland, in Austria, in England, in Italy (Toyama Ryu Italia) and in France (French Shinkendo Association).

== See also ==
- Battōjutsu
- Imperial Japanese Army Academy
- Tameshigiri
- Nakayama Hakudō
