= Katori Shrine =

Shinto shrine in Chiba Prefecture, Japan

Katori Jingū 香取神宮
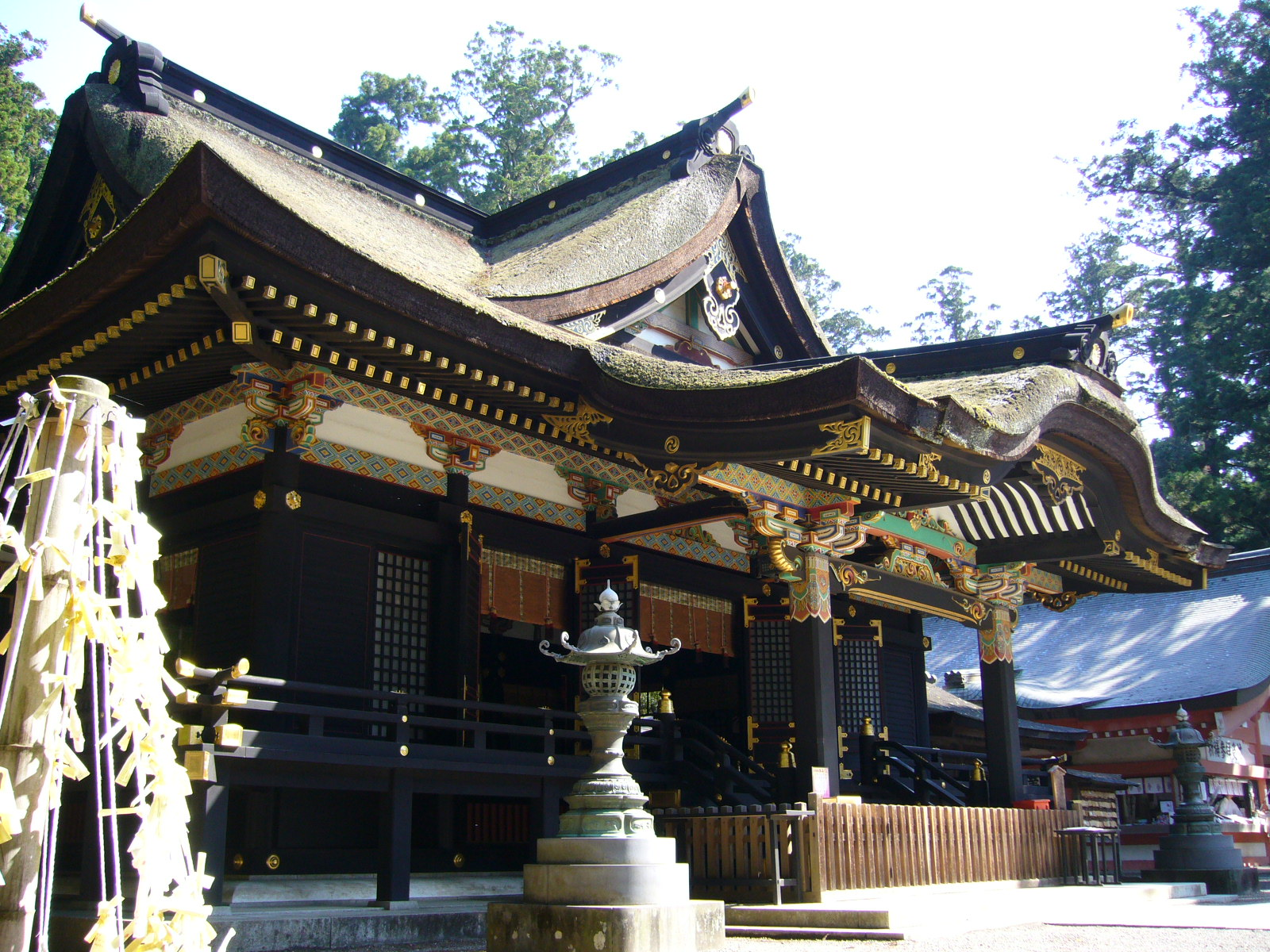
- The Haiden, or prayer hall of Katori Shrine

- Location within Chiba Prefecture Location within Japan

Religion
- Affiliation: Shinto
- Deity: Futsunushi
- Festivals: Reisai, Shinkosai (April 14th)
- Type: Katori shrine

Location
- Location: 1697 Katori, Katori-shi, Chiba-ken 287-0017
- Interactive map of Katori Jingū 香取神宮
- Coordinates: 35°53′10″N 140°31′44″E

Architecture
- Style: Sangensya-Nagare-zukuri
- Established: c.642 BC
- National Treasure of Japan

Website
- Official website

The Katori Shrine (香取神宮, Katori Jingū) is a Shintō shrine in the city of Katori in Chiba Prefecture, Japan. It is the ichinomiya of former Shimōsa Province, and is the head shrine of the approximately 400 Katori shrines around the country (located primarily in the Kantō region). The main festival of the shrine is held annually on April 14, with a three-day Grand Festival held every 12 years.

== Enshrined kami ==
The primary kami of Katori Jingū is

- Futsunushi-no-kami (経津主神), the kami of swords and lightning, and a general of Amaterasu.

== History ==
The foundation of Katori Jingū predates the historical period. Per the Hitachi-koku Fudoki, an ancient record and per shrine tradition, it was established in 643 BC, the 18th year of the reign of Emperor Jimmu. During this period, the Ō clan (多氏, Ō-shi) migrated from Higo Province in Kyushu, conquering local emishi tribes, and forming an alliance with the nearby Nakatomi clan, the progenitors of the Fujiwara clan at what is now Kashima Jingū. As the Hitachi-koku Fudoki dates from the early 7th century, the shrine must certainly have been founded earlier than this. The shrine appears in all of the Rikkokushi official national histories, which cover events to 887. The shrine was regarded as a tutelary shrine of the Fujiwara clan, and a bunrei of Futsunushi was brought from Katori to be enshrined in the second sanctuary of Kasuga Taisha when that shrine was founded in Nara. In the Heian period per the Engishiki (written in 927), Katori was listed as a myōjin taisha (名神大) and was one of only three shrines (alongside Ise Jingū and Kashima Jingū) to be given the higher-level designation of Jingū. In the Heian period, the shrine came to be regarded as the ichinomiya of the province.

During the Kamakura and Muromachi periods, Katori Jingū was revered as a shrine for the military class and received many donations from Minamoto no Yoritomo and Ashikaga Takauji. It also earned income from its control of fishing rights in the Katori Sea and highway barriers in both Hitachi Province and Shimōsa. Under the Edo period Tokugawa shogunate, the shrine was rebuilt in 1607, and again in 1700. Many of the structures in the present shrine date from this 1700 rebuilding.

During the Meiji period era of State Shinto, the shrine was rated as an Imperial shrine, 1st rank (官幣大社, Kanpei Taisha) under the Modern system of ranked Shinto Shrines

== Cultural Properties ==
=== National Treasures ===
- Kaijū Budō Kagami (海獣葡萄鏡), Tang dynasty China. This round cupronickel mirror has a diameter of 29.6 centimeters, and weight of 4.56 kilograms. It is decorated with bas-relief flowers, insects and a variety of real and mythological animals. It is almost identical to a mirror held by the Shōsōin Treasury in Nara. The mirror itself is preserved at the Nara National Museum. It was designated a National Treasure in 1953.

=== Important Cultural Properties ===
- Honden (本殿), Edo period (1700). The Honden of Katori Shrine was traditionally reconstructed every 20 years, similar to the system used at Ise Shrine until the system fell apart during the Sengoku period. The current structure was built in 1700 and was designated as Important Cultural Property in 1977.
- Rōmon (楼門), Edo period (1700). The Rōmon gate was also constructed in 1700 and was designated an Important Cultural Property in 1983. It displays the shrine's name plaque written by Fleet Admiral Tōgō Heihachirō.
- Koseto ōyū Kominu (古瀬戸黄釉狛犬), Kamakura to Muromachi period. The shrine has a ceramic Koseto pair of komainu, standing 17.6 and 17.9 centimeters high. One of these statues was featured on a 250 Yen definitive stamp of Japan. The set of statues was designated as an Important Cultural Property in 1953.
- Sōryū kagami (双竜鏡), Heian period. This mirror has a diameter 20.5 cm and is made of white copper. It is inscribed with the date of 1149, and is the oldest example of an inscribed Japanese mirror. The style is different from general Japanese mirrors, and was influenced by Song dynasty China or Goryeo. It was designated on November 14, 1953.
- Katori ōnegike monjo (香取大禰宜家文書), Heian to Edo period. This is a set of 381 documents that was in the possession of the Katori clan, the hereditary priesthood of the shrine. It was collectively designated on November 14, 1953.

=== Registered Tangible Cultural Properties ===
- Kaun-kaku (香雲閣), Meiji period. This two-story, hipped-roof Japanese-style building is located on the southeast side of the Katori Jingu Shrine and has been used for meetings. It was designated in 2000.
- Haiden (拝殿), Heiden (幣殿), Shinsensho (神饌所) Showa period. This building was constructed during a major renovation from 1945 by the Shrine Bureau of the Ministry of Home Affairs. It was designated in 2001.

=== Chiba Prefecture Designated Tangible Cultural Properties ===
- Former Haiden (旧拝殿), Edo period (1700).
- Imperial Envoy's Gate (勅使門, Chokushimon) Edo Period (1781) The Chokushimon Gate is three bays across, two bays deep, and has a single gabled roof. It has a thatched roof and is fitted with side walls on both sides. Standing on a low plot of land just before the main shrine grounds, the gate, was built as the front gate for the Daigūji family, the highest-ranking Shinto priest, and was used as an entrance and exit for imperial envoys.
- Katori Jungu Ancient Treasures (古神宝類), Nara through Edo Period. These items include: 40 bronze mirrors of 30 different types, two shield-shaped iron products, one iron kettle with an inscription from 1548 (Tenbun 17), two gilt bronze fan-shaped sacred vessels, six gilt bronze fans with handles, nine bowl-shaped copper offering vessels, ten disc-shaped copper offering vessels with legs, one sword (inscribed Toshitsune), one long sword with an inscription from 1607 (Keicho 12), one utensil with an inscription from 1618 (Genna 4), and black lacquerware. One hand box with chrysanthemum design and maki-e lacquer, one hand box with moist lacquer, one hand box with black lacquer, 106 combs, one wooden lion's mouth mask, one wooden Omi mask, one wooden old woman mask, one wooden plaque with a divine name said to have been written by Emperor Kameyama, five volumes of Katori ancient documents, one mirror box with an inscription dated 1466 (Kansho 7), six volumes of former Genta Shuku family documents, three small boxes with mother-of-pearl and maki-e wisteria design, two combs with mother-of-pearl and maki-e wisteria design

== Gallery ==
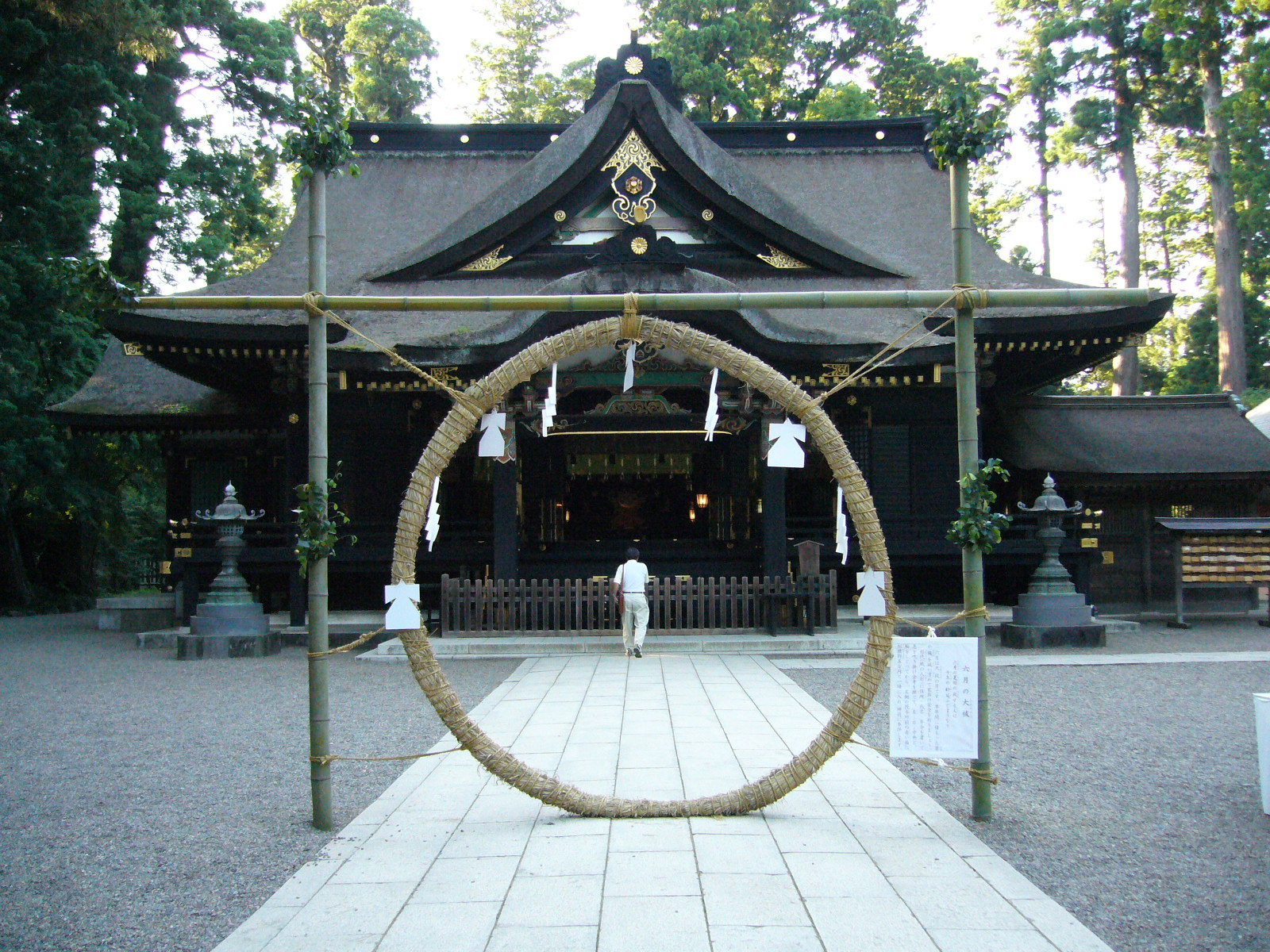
Ōharae

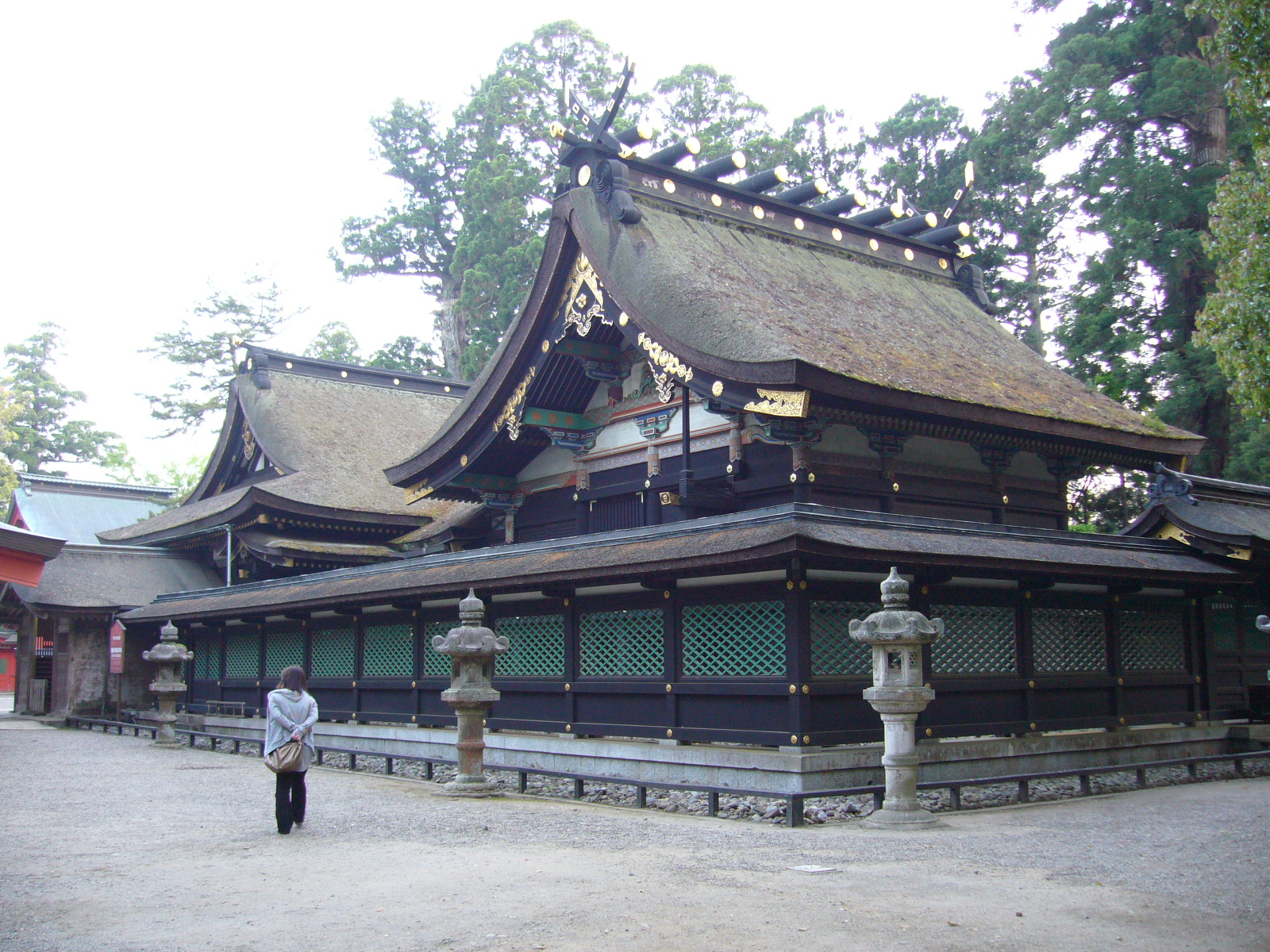
Honden (main hall)

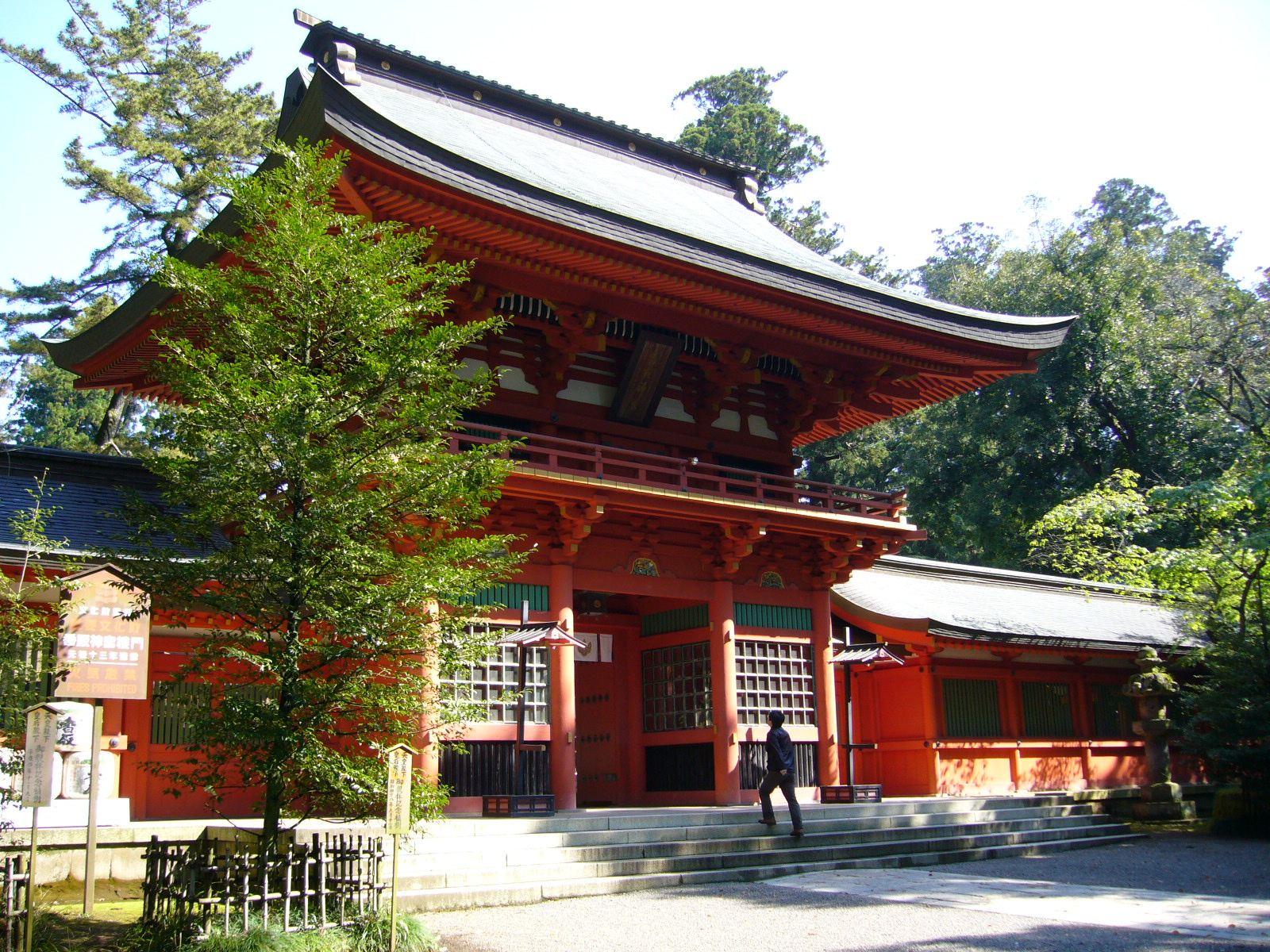
Rōmon

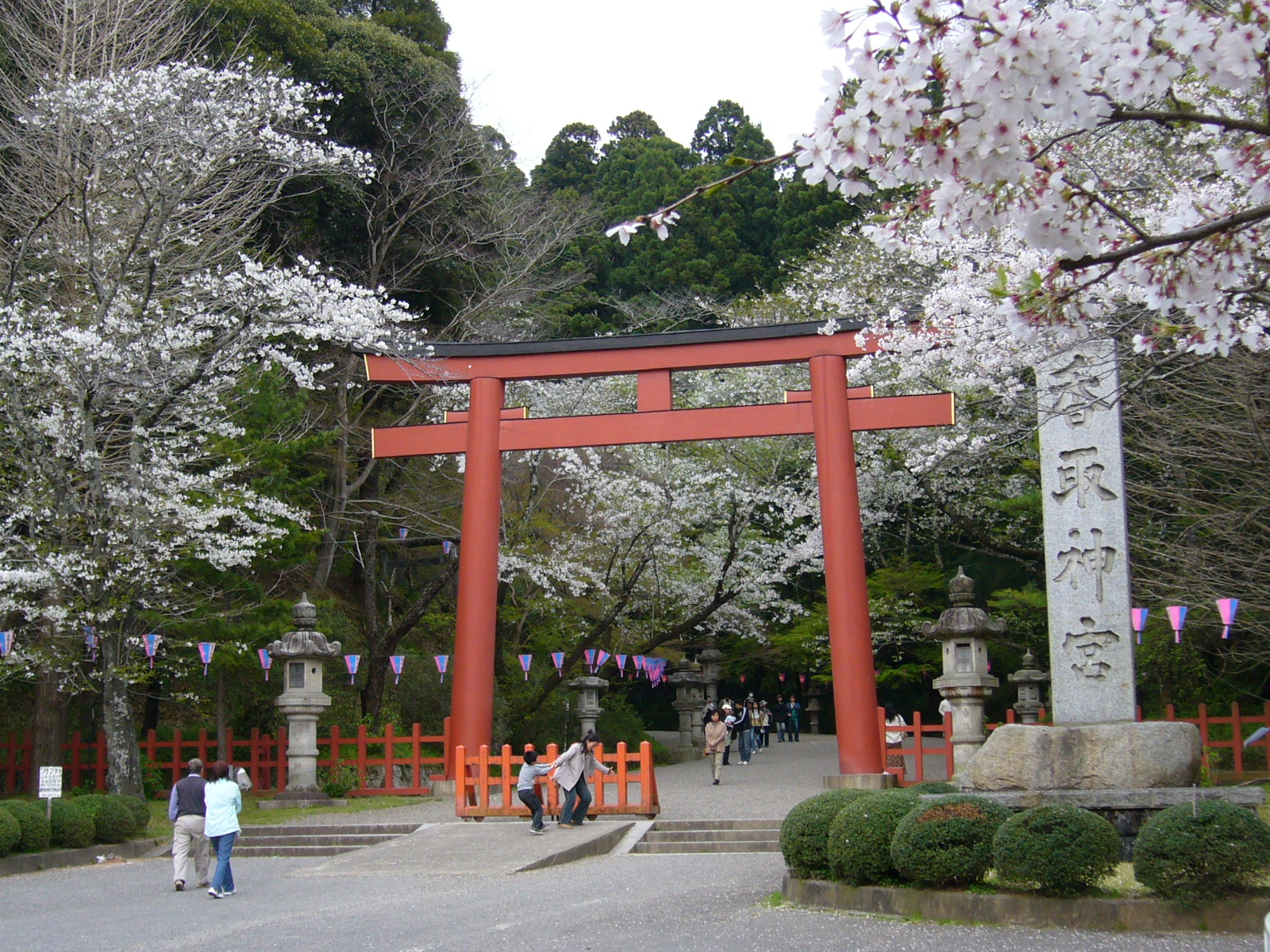
Ni-no-Torii

== See also ==
- Ichinomiya
- List of Jingū
- List of Shinto shrines
- Iizasa Choisai Ienao
- Tenshin Shōden Katori Shintō-ryū
- List of National Treasures of Japan (crafts-others)
- Japanese cruiser Katori, the Imperial Japanese Navy light cruiser named after the shrine
