= Battōjutsu =

Japanese sword drawing school

Battōjutsu (抜刀術)
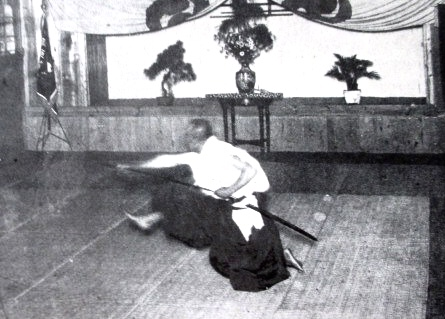
- Focus: Weaponry
- Hardness: Non-competitive
- Country of origin: Japan
- Parenthood: Kenjutsu ('sword craft'); Tō-hō ('sword method')
- Olympic sport: No

Battōjutsu (抜刀術, battō-jutsu; 'craft of drawing out the sword') is an old term for iaijutsu (居合術). Battōjutsu is often used interchangeably with the terms iaijutsu and battō (抜刀).

Generally, battōjutsu is practiced as a part of a classical ryū and is closely integrated with the tradition of kenjutsu. It is practised with a live blade (katana), often simply as solo kata. The training is for combative effectiveness, through factors such as distancing, timing and targeting. As such, battōjutsu is not intended for sport-like kendo.

== List of schools ==
Koryu school:

- Shinmei Muso Ryu Battōjutsu (神明夢想流 抜刀術), founded by Hayashizaki Jinsuke (Minamoto no) Shigenobu (林崎甚助(源)重信) (c. 1542–1621)
- Sekiguchi Ryu Battōjutsu (or Iai) (関口流抜刀術), founded by Sekiguchi Ujinari (関口氏業) (1636–1716)
- Kage Ryu Chōken Battōjutsu (影流長剣抜刀術), founded by Yamamoto Hisaya Masakatsu of Akizuki Han.

Gendai schools developed after the beginning of the Meiji era:

- Toyama-ryū (戸山流), was founded in 1925 at the Rikugun Toyama Gakkō (Toyama Army Academy) (陸軍戸山学校). This system of swordsmanship was developed for the military by a committee including sword masters Nakayama Hakudō (中山博道) and Takano Sasaburo (高野佐三郎), and Lieutenant Colonel Morinaga Kiyoshi (森永清 中佐). Morinaga selected 5 kata produced by Nakayama arranged in tachi-iai. Toyama-ryu was not taught generally but was reserved for officers, as they still carried swords. In 1940, Mochida Seiji (持田盛二) and Saimura Goro (斎村吾郎) added and revised the kata. In November of 1941, an official manual on Toyama-ryu was distributed widely within the Japanese Army. In 1942, a running slash-type kata geared toward cavalry charges was added.
- Nakamura-ryū (中村流), founded in the mid-20th century by Nakamura Taizaburō (中村泰三郎), who had previously taught Gunto no Soho at the Toyama Academy.
- Zen Nihon Batto Do Renmei (全日本抜刀道連盟) or ZNBDR was created in 1977 under Nakamura Taizaburo which practice 5 Shoden Seitei and 8 Chuden Seitei Kata.
- Dai Nihon Batto Ho (大日本抜刀法) was created in 1939 by Kono Hyakuren for the Japanese Naval Academy. It contains 12 Waza, 7 Shoden Kata and 5 Okuden Kata. Today it is taught as Eishin Ryu Batto Ho and included 10 Eishin-ryu kumitachi.
- Enshin Itto Ryu Battojutsu (円⼼⼀⼑流 抜⼑術) was created in 1936 by Machita Genshinsai and his Father. It contains 6 Levels. The main roots came from Kashima Shinto Ryu and Hokushin Itto Ryu, and some else. The ancestors of Machita Sensei served under the famous Aizu Clan and fought in the Boshin War. From their mother's side the roots date back to the Satake Clan. Nowadays the Ryuha is a part of the Enbukan (円武館), under the guidance by Machita Fudoshin Soke.
