= Iizasa Ienao =

Japanese martial artist (c. 1387 – 1488)

Iizasa Chōisai Ienao 飯篠 長威斉 家直
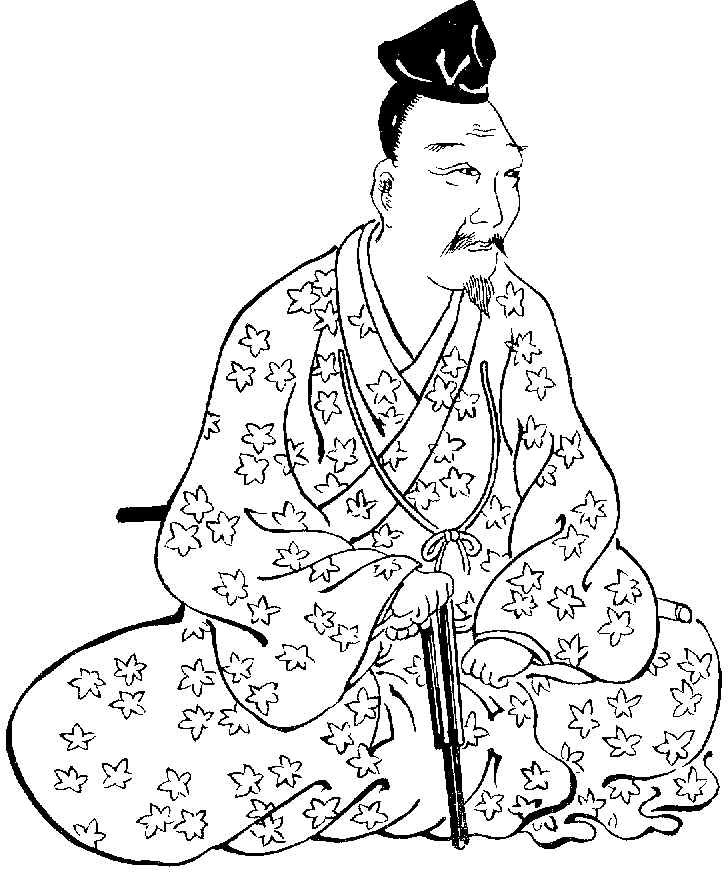
- Iizasa Chōisai Ienao (飯篠 長威斉 家直, c. 1387 – 1488), founder of Tenshin Shōden Katori Shintō-ryū

Iizasa Chōisai Ienao (飯篠 長威斉 家直; c. 1387 – May 26, 1488) was the founder of Tenshin Shōden Katori Shintō-ryū which is a traditional (koryū) Japanese martial art. His Buddhist posthumous name is Taiganin-den-Taira-no-Ason-Iga-no-Kami-Raiodo-Hon-Daikoji.

He was reputed to be a respected spearman and swordsman who served the Chiba family in what is today Chiba Prefecture. When his hometown was destroyed, he began wandering the land until he settled down near the Katori Shrine and founded the Tenshin Shōden Katori Shintō-ryū in c. 1447.
