= Komagawa Tarōzaemon =

Komagawa Tarozaemon
- Other names: Kaishin
- Style: Kenjutsu, Naginatajutsu, and Juttejutsu.
- Teacher(s): Kamiizumi Ise no kami Nobutsuna
- Rank: Founder, practitioner of Shinkage-ryū

Komagawa Tarozaemon was a disciple under the famous Kamiizumi Ise no kami Nobutsuna, founder of Shinkage-ryū Tarozaemon's Komagawa Kaishin-ryū was handed down through the Maeda clan of Kaga, where he taught the use of the tachi (long sword), kodachi (short sword), jitte (a hooked truncheon used for arresting and disarming), naginata (glaive), and two-sword fighting
