= Komagawa Kaishin-ryū =

Traditional Japanese martial art

Komagawa Kaishin-ryū (駒川改心流)
- Ko-ryū

Foundation
- Founder: Komagawa Tarōzaemon Kuniyoshi (駒川 太郎左衛門 国吉)
- Period founded: Late Muromachi period (1336–1573) to Late Azuchi–Momoyama period (1568–1603)

Current information
- Current headmaster: Kuroda Tetsuzan (黒田鉄山), 15th sōke.

Arts taught
- Art: Description
- Kenjutsu - ōdachi, kodachi, Nito: Sword art; with long sword, short sword, and two swords.
- Naginatajutsu: Glaive art
- Juttejutsu: Truncheon art

Ancestor schools
- Shinkage-ryū, Kage-ryū (via Shinkage-ryū).

Descendant schools
- None.

Komagawa Kaishin-ryū (駒川改心流) is a traditional Japanese martial art established by Komagawa Tarōzaemon Kuniyoshi (later Komagawa Kaishin) based on the Shinkage-ryū of Kamiizumi Ise no kami Nobutsuna. The art is now part of the Kuroda family bujutsu and the only authorized teacher is sōke Kuroda Tetsuzan himself (see Teaching section).

== Renewed Heart: the transmission of Shinkage-ryū ==
Komagawa Tarōzaemon first learned Shinkage-ryū from Kamiizumi Ise no kami Nobutsuna. But even though he soon felt confident in his skills, Kamiizumi would refuse to give him the Shinkage-ryū menkyo, only saying that Komagawa had a "bad habit" in his movements. Komagawa felt wronged by his teacher's constant rebuttals and decided to take the high road and impress Kamiizumi by getting a menkyo in many other kenjutsu ryū. Returning some years later with over a dozen menkyo, he tried to get Kamiizumi to give him his hard-earned Shinkage-ryū menkyo at last by showing him what he had learned. But Kamiizumi didn't flinch a bit and stuck to his previous statement about Komagawa having something not quite right in his movements. Then something happened that made Komagawa change his outlook on his whole practice up to then. One evening, while Komagawa was deeply engaged in training, a pack of wolf sneaked up on him. He only had a wakizashi on himself at the time, but he still managed to drive off the pack by repeatedly using a single technique, technique which would later become the first tachi kata and the basis of Komagawa Kaishin-ryū's whole curriculum. During the tense fight, Komagawa realized that he was left-handed and that this was what Kamiizumi referred to by saying he had a "bad habit". Komagawa then rebased his whole attitude towards his teacher and changed his name to "Kaishin" or "renewed heart" to show that fact. After correcting his movements, he was finally given a Shinkage-ryū menkyo by Kamiizumi. Komagawa then taught under the banner of Shinkage-ryū. The name of the ryū was changed to its present name by one of Komagawa's student, Sakurada Jirōzaemon Sadakuni (桜田次郎左衛門貞国). Sakurada also added the jutte kata to the curriculum.

== The Meiwa incident ==
In 1767 (Meiwa 4), a samurai by the name of Fujii Umon Sadayuki (藤井右門定之), real name Fujii Naoaki Yoshitarō (藤井直明吉太郎), was sentenced and executed for lèse majesté towards the Tokugawa shogunate along with his teacher, a renowned scholar of Confucianism and military strategy named Yamagata Daini. They were denounced by troublemakers on the public place thus forcing the shogunate into investigating the allegations, which were that they conspired to mount a revolt against the shogunate in an attempt to reestablish the Emperor as de facto ruler of Japan. Since the trials and subsequent verdicts were kept secret even though the accusations were first made publicly, both were in the meantime unjustly vilified by the public as traitors to the shōgun and disturbers of the peace. The vilification intensified after their executions, which were made in public, while the specific offenses under which they were condemned still remained secret. The reason to this secrecy may be that the shogunate wanted the rumours about their association with the restoration movement to continue, although the two men were ultimately not found guilty of advocating the restoration of power to the Emperor. It was true, however, that Yamagata criticized the Tokugawa regime in a published book, and so the shogunate felt they had to act rapidly. The students of Yamagata were thus almost immediately released, except for Umon who was directly implicated in the original allegations as he was the one who spurred the troublemakers. The student and the teacher were later executed, in all probability as a deterrent to the proponents of restoration, while the troublemakers were exiled.

At the time of this incident, Umon was the chief proponent of Komagawa Kaishin-ryū, going so far as to add a complete series of kodachi kata in the curriculum, a series that has been handed down to this day. As a consequence of the bad influence brought on the ryū's name by Umon's involvement in what was then seen by the public at large as an attempted revolt, many if not all fiefs closed down their Komagawa Kaishin-ryū school branches. Even in Toyama, the birthplace of the ryū, it has since then been publicly referred to by the name of its parent art, the Shinkage-ryū. The secrecy was so complete that even the grandfather of the current sōke, the 13th sōke Kuroda Yasuji, thought when he was young that he was practicing Shinkage-ryū. Only by comparing his techniques with practitioners of other ryū did the thought cross his mind that he did not actually practice Shinkage-ryū at all. He then asked his own father, the 11th sōke Kuroda Hiroshi Masakuni, who passed down this story about the concealment of the ryū's real name and origins. Yasuji was thus the first to use the name "Komagawa Kaishin-ryū" outside of Toyama since the incident when he relocated to Tokyo at the start of the Taishō period.

== Teaching ==
In most koryū, teaching duty is either fully delegated (as in present Katori Shintō-ryū) and/or divided between many teachers who have received official permission to teach, some of whom are sometimes permitted to teach only a certain part of the curriculum. This permission is usually granted through a document, most often called a menkyo kaiden or "license of transmission", which certifies that the holder knows all the technical curriculum that can be taught or that he is qualified to teach (sometimes there are "secret teachings" or okugi that are only transmitted from sōke to sōke). Komagawa Kaishin-ryū however is unusual in that the only authorized teacher is the sōke himself. This means that in order to learn a technique or kata, you have to learn it from Kuroda Tetsuzan directly. This is in order to preserve the kata's original forms as best as possible. The same holds true for all ryū of which Kuroda sensei is the sōke.

There is only one actual dōjō, the Shinbukan Kuroda Dojo (振武舘 黒田道場) in Saitama, although there are a total of six keikokai or practice groups around the world. Two of these are in Japan (Kami-itabashi in Tokyo and Amagasaki in Kansai), three in the United-States of America (San Antonio, Encinitas and Chicago) and one in France (Paris). The locations outside Japan are visited at least once a year. Kuroda sensei personally examines the candidacy of prospective students; enquiries should be made to the geographically closest practice group, excluding those in Japan.
