= Kamiizumi Nobutsuna =

Samurai in Japan's Sengoku period

Kamiizumi Ise-no-Kami Nobutsuna
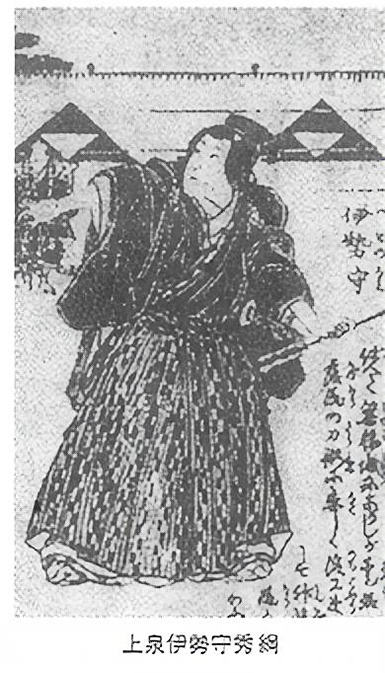
- Artwork of Kamiizumi Ise-no-kami Hidetsuna (written as 上泉伊勢守秀綱).
- Born: Kamiizumi Hidetsuna c. 1508; Kaigayagō Kamiizumi, Kōzuke Province
- Died: 1572 or 1577 or 1582
- Native name: 上泉 伊勢守 信綱
- Other names: Kamiizumi Musashi-no-Kami, Ōgo Musashi-no-Kami
- Style: Kenjutsu
- Teacher: Aisu Ikōsai

Other information
- Notable students: Yagyū Munetoshi, Hikita Bungorō, Komagawa Tarōzaemon

Kamiizumi Nobutsuna, (上泉 信綱), born Kamiizumi Ise-no-Kami Fujiwara-no-Hidetsuna, (c.1508 – 1572/1577/1582) was a samurai in Japan's Sengoku period famous for creating the Shinkage-ryū school of combat. He is also well known as Kamiizumi Isenokami (上泉 伊勢守) which was his name as a samurai official (武家官位, Bukekani) for a period of time.

== Early life ==
Kamiizumi was born as Kamiizumi Hidetsuna in his family castle in Kōzuke Province (modern day Maebashi, Gunma Prefecture). His family were minor landed lords in the service of the Yamanouchi branch of the Uesugi clan. At the time of his birth, Kōzuke Province was being contested by the Uesugi, the Hōjō, and the Takeda clans. His family was originally a branch of the Ōgo clan that moved to nearby Kaigayagō Kamiizumi and took its name for their own. When the main Ōgo clan moved to Musashi Province, the Kamiizumi family took over Ōgo Castle, at the southern foot of Mount Akagi.

From the age of 13 or 14, Kamiizumi was tutored by a Zen rōshi named Tenmyō in Zen Buddhism and other Eastern philosophy. In his youth, he went to nearby Shimōsa Province (modern day Chiba Prefecture) and began studying Nen-ryū, and Shintō-ryū. Later he went to Hitachi Province (modern day Ibaraki Prefecture) and studied Kage-ryū. It is not clear who Kamiizumi’s teachers were; in all of his later writings, he marks the start of lineal transmission of his art from himself. He was a younger contemporary of Tsukahara Bokuden. The lineage of Jikishinkage-ryū puts Kamiizumi second after Matsumoto Bizen-no-kami. The lineage of Hikita Kage-ryū puts Kamiizumi second or third after Aisu Ikōsai. In Yagyū Shinkage-ryū, it is believed that Kamiizumi learned Kage-ryū from Ikōsai, receiving full transmission around the age of 23. A few years later, Kamiizumi learned battle strategy and divination from a man named Ogasawara Ujitaka.

In the Empi-no-Tachi scrolls that Kamiizumi gave to Yagyū Munetoshi and Marume Nagayoshi, he wrote that he had studied Nen-ryū, Shintō-ryū, Kage-ryū, and others, and had developed an innovation from Kage-ryū, and thus named his school Shinkage-ryū (New Kage-ryū). In his book Shōden Shinkage-ryū, Yagyū Toshinaga surmised that Kamiizumi created Shinkage-ryū in his mid-30s.

== As a general ==
In 1555, Hōjō Ujiyasu ordered an attack on Ōgo castle, now commanded by Kamiizumi. Kamiizumi surrendered the castle without a fight, and joined Ujiyasu. This same year, Uesugi Kenshin invaded western Kōzuke in order to re-take Hirai Castle. Kamiizumi abandoned the Hōjō side, and sent messages to the Uesugi. He became one of Uesugi's generals, and helped the Uesugi drive out the Hōjō forces. Kenshin seized total control of Kōzuke, installed Nagano Narimasa as governor in Minowa Castle, and returned to his base in Echigo.

Kamiizumi joined Nagano's service, and quickly became one of the "Sixteen Spears of Nagano House". In particular he distinguished himself when Nagano attacked Yamanaka Castle, and became known as "the best spearsman of Kōzuke." Nagano held off attacks from Takeda Shingen for seven years from Minowa Castle, but he died in 1561. His heir, Ukyō-no-shin Narimori, was only 16 years old, so Nagano’s death was kept secret as long as possible. Shingen eventually found out, and in 1563 (some sources suggest 1566), he invaded western Kōzuke with a force of over 10,000 Kai soldiers. The Kōyō Gunkan dates the invasion to 1563, while the records of Chōnenji, the temple where Nagano was buried, dates it to 1566. Minowa Castle was completely surrounded and besieged. Narimori killed himself on February 22, morale fell, and the castle followed on the 28th.

Kamiizumi fought his way out of the castle, and escaped to eastern Kōzuke, where he joined with Kiryū Ōinosuke Naotsuna. But Naotsuna died soon thereafter and his son Matajirō Shigetsuna took over. With this, Kamiizumi returned to Minowa Castle. It is not known why. One story is that he returned because of many friends still at the castle, and there he joined the service of Naitō Shūri-no-kami, the governor appointed by Shingen. Or, another story is that, impressed by Kamiizumi's valor, Shingen invited him to join the Takeda side after Minowa Castle fell. How exactly it came about is not clear, but what is clear is that Kamiizumi became a minor official to the Takeda clan.

A common story is that in recognition of his tremendous ability in defense of the castle, Takeda Shingen allowed Kamiizumi the use of the 信 character (read as either “shin” in “Shingen”, or “nobu” as in “Harunobu”) in his name, and thereafter Kamiizumi was known as Nobutsuna. However, in the license of transmission given to Yagyū Munetoshi in 1565, Kamiizumi signs it as “Kamiizumi Ise-no-kami Fujiwara-no-Hidetsuna”, and in the scrolls given to Munetoshi the following year he signs “Kamiizumi Ise-no-kami Fujiwara-no-Nobutsuna (上泉伊勢守藤原信綱).” If Minowa Castle fell in 1563, Kamiizumi was still using “Hidetsuna” two years later. If it fell in 1566, Kamiizumi was using Nobutsuna before Takeda Shingen attacked. Name changing was common in that era, and it’s likely that the change to Nobutsuna was unrelated to Takeda Shingen.

== Spreading Shinkage-ryū ==
After joining Nagano's service, Kamiizumi made a number of trips to Kyoto, then the capital. In 1558, he met a young Marume Nagayoshi there. While traveling to Kyoto in late 1563, he met Yagyū Munetoshi, and stayed in Yagyū Village for about half a year before arriving at the capital in 1564. During one of these trips, Kamiizumi and Marume demonstrated Shinkage-ryū to the shōgun Ashikaga Yoshiteru. Yoshiteru wrote a certificate of admiration, declaring Kamiizumi's school unparalleled in the land, and praising Marume's performance. The certificate is undated. Later, Kamiizumi would move to Kyoto, teaching Shinkage-ryū to various courtiers and noblemen of the Ashikaga Shogunate.

Kamiizumi gathered a great many students. One source claims that he had 84 disciples with him when he went to Kyoto in 1564, and in the following year Kamiizumi himself claims in his certificate to Munetoshi that he had hundreds of disciples, presumably spread all over Japan at that time. Among his famous students are Yagyū Munetoshi, whose line of Shinkage-ryū exists to this day; Hikita Bungorō, Kamiizumi's nephew and founder of Hikita Kage-ryū; Hōzōin In'ei, a monk who founded Hōzōin-ryū sōjutsu; Marume Nagayoshi, founder of Taisha-ryū; Nonaka Shinkura, founder of Shin Shinkage Ichiden-ryū; and Komagawa Kuniyoshi, founder of Komagawa Kaishin-ryū.

== Later years and death ==
A counselor in Kyōto named Yamashina Tokitsugu wrote in his diary that Kamiizumi came to the capital in 1570. He stayed with Yamashina for about two years, teaching Shinkage-ryū, and serving Yamashina. During this time he was known as Kamiizumi Musashi-no-kami Nobutsuna, or sometimes Ōgo Musashi-no-kami. In 1572 he visited Yagyū Village, and then traveled back to eastern Japan, with a letter of introduction from Yamashina to the Yuki clan in Shimōsa Province. The last known record of Kamiizumi is an entry in the records of Seirinji, a Soto Zen Buddhist temple in the town where Kamiizumi's family castle once stood. The record notes that Kamiizumi helped establish the temple in 1577, erecting a gravestone and paying for services. The temple still stands in Maebashi, Gunma Prefecture.

It is not known when Kamiizumi died. One record notes that he died in 1572, but this is clearly contradicted by the Seirinji record noted above. Another record notes that he died in 1577 in Yagyū Village, but the Yagyū family have no records of this, and while there is a memorial to him there, there is no grave. One theory is that the gravestone and services held in 1577 were for Kamiizumi himself, while another is that the gravestone and services were for the 12th anniversary of his son's death, a common rite in Japan. A document of Kiraku-ryū, a jujutsu school based in the Gunma area, says Kamiizumi died in Odawara in 1577, while a document of the Kamiizumi family suggests he died in Odawara in 1582.

== Impact ==
Kamiizumi is considered a major figure in the development of kenjutsu. Through his major students, numerous branch traditions were created and spread around Japan. Schools still extant today that claim Kamiizumi as a founder, co-founder, or progenitor include (Yagyū) Shinkage-ryū, Jikishinkage-ryū, Kashima Shin-ryū, Taisha-ryū, and Komagawa Kaishin-ryū.

He is popularly credited as the inventor of the fukuro-shinai, a practice sword made from split-bamboo in a leather sleeve, allowing practitioners to practice together and swing with full-force without fear of death or major injury. The particular version used in Yagyū Shinkage-ryū is called a hikihada-shinai, "toad-skin shinai". The leather sleeve is made of cow or horse hide, but after being lacquered Kamakura Red, it resembles the skin of a hikigaeru.

The Honchō Bugei Shōden, a mid-Edo period collection of historical stories, related one of Kamiizumi travelling to Myōkōji Temple, in Ichinomiya, Aichi Prefecture. An insane man had kidnapped a child and was hiding in a barn with a sword. Kamiizumi shaved his head, borrowed a kesa from a priest, and approached the barn with two rice balls. Kamiizumi used the rice balls to lull the man into dropping his guard, and then quickly seized him and saved the child. This episode was later used by writer/director Akira Kurosawa in his film Seven Samurai.

In 2008, the city of Maebashi celebrated the 500th anniversary of Kamiizumi’s birth with a festival. Services were held at the Kamiizumi gravesite, and a 2.5-meter-tall (8.2 ft) bronze statue of Kamiizumi, holding a fukuro-shinai, was unveiled. Yagyū Koichi, a lineal descendant of Kamiizumi’s student Yagyū Munetoshi, demonstrated Shinkage-ryū with his students.
