= Hikita Bungorō =

16th century Japanese swordsman

Hikita Bungorō (疋田 文五郎, 1537–1605), Kagetada by his nanori. Hikita was a Japanese swordsman during the Sengoku period of the 16th century. Hikita Bungoro was the nephew of the famous swordsman Kamiizumi Hidetsuna, in which they were both very well versed in the ways of bujutsu. Another famous swordsman by the name of Yagyū Muneyoshi (the father of Yagyū Munenori) had seen the superb skills set by Hidetsuna. (Note: Kamiizumi Nobutsuna traveled to Nara to entreat In'ei to the Shinkage-ryū, In'ei arranged for a duel to take place.) Following this Hōzōin In'ei, the head monk of the Hōzōin temple in Nara, arranged for a duel between Muneyoshi and Hidetsuna. However, Hidetsuna sent Bungoro to take up the challenge as to underestimate the abilities of Muneyoshi. Throughout the course of Bungoro's duel, he had struck Muneyoshi several times with his shinai, which greatly impressed those in attendance.

Bungorō carried on the Shinkage-ryū lineage separately from Yagyū Shinkage-ryū, a martial arts school called Hikita Kage-ryū (疋田陰流), primarily a sword and spears school, but also using kusarigama, naginata and Odachi. It is taught in numerous places in Japan, like the Shumpūkan of Nagoya. (Note: Noted in "Famous Samurai of the Sengoku Period")

== Bibliography ==
- De Lange, William (2010), Famous Japanese Swordsmen, The Warring States Period, Floating World Editions. ISBN 1-891640-43-7
