= Tamiya-ryū (Kuroda) =

Tamiya-ryū Iaijutsu (民弥流居合術)
- Ko-ryū

Foundation
- Founder: Tamiya Gon'emon Muneshige (民弥 権右衛門 宗重)
- Period founded: Early Edo period (1603–1868)

Current information
- Current headmaster: Kuroda Tetsuzan (黒田鉄山), 15th sōke.

Arts taught
- Art: Description
- Iaijutsu - katana: Sword drawing art; with long sword.

Ancestor schools
- Shinmei Musō-ryū, Muraku-ryū

Descendant schools
- None.

Tamiya-ryū Iaijutsu (民弥流居合術) is a martial art founded by Kamiizumi Magojirō Yoshitane (上泉孫次郎義胤), who later took his mother's name and became known as Tamiya Gon'emon Muneshige (民弥権右衛門宗重). The art is now part of the Kuroda family bujutsu.

== Particularities ==
Unlike most iaijutsu and iaidō schools, which place the sword at the hips between the kaku obi and the gi or between the folds of the obi, practitioners of Tamiya-ryū place the sword under a heko obi (traditionally used to secure a child on one's back) that is worn over the hakama. The sageo is not attached to the hakama himo or let loose, as in many other schools, but is tied in a knot at the kurigata, thus preventing the sword from falling out of the heko obi and permitting greater freedom of movement. Using a second obi over the hakama instead of the kaku obi that is already used under the hakama to secure the gi serves only one purpose but one of great importance: since the heko obi is softer, the act of drawing the sword will be made more freely and one will be able to feel what it is to truly draw the sword and not simply pull it out of the saya. This is all the more needed nowadays since kaku obi are rarely worn outside of special occasions. Learning to draw correctly with a softer obi will in the end make all obi feel soft.

== Teaching ==
In most koryū, teaching duty is either fully delegated (as in present Katori Shintō-ryū) and/or divided between many teachers who have received official permission to teach, some of whom are sometimes permitted to teach only a certain part of the curriculum. This permission is usually granted through a document, most often called a menkyo kaiden or "license of transmission", which certifies that the holder knows all the technical curriculum that can be taught or that he is qualified to teach (sometimes there are "secret teachings" or okugi that are only transmitted from sōke to sōke). Tamiya-ryū Iaijutsu however is unusual in that the only authorized teacher is the sōke himself. This means that in order to learn a technique or kata, you have to learn it from Kuroda Tetsuzan directly. This is in order to preserve the kata's original forms as best as possible. The same holds true for all ryū of which Kuroda-sensei is the sōke.

There is only one actual dōjō, the Shinbukan Kuroda Dōjō (振武舘 黒田道場) in Saitama, although there are a total of six keikokai or practice groups around the world. Two of these are in Japan (Kami-itabashi in Tokyo and Amagasaki in Kansai), three in the United-States of America (San Antonio, Encinitas and Chicago) and one in France (Paris). The locations outside Japan are visited at least once a year. Kuroda sensei personally examines the candidacy of prospective students; enquiries should be made to the geographically closest practice group, excluding those in Japan.
