= Tetsuzan Kuroda =

Japanese martial artist (1950–2024)

- Born: 1950; Japan
- Died: 3 March 2024 (aged 73–74)

Tetsuzan Kuroda (1950 – 3 March 2024) was a martial artist. He was a featured participant in the Aiki Expo (2003), and was regarded as one of Japan's greatest swordsmen.

Kuroda Tetsuzan, sensei of the Shinbukan Kuroda Dojo, was the Soke of several ancient Samurai military disciplines. Kuroda sensei inherited this knowledge through his family line, and was the headmaster of the Kuroda family martial legacy. The arts that he inherited include:

- Komagawa Kaishin-ryū kenjutsu
- Shishin-Takuma-ryū jujutsu
- Tamiya-ryū iaijutsu
- Tsubaki-Kotengu ryū bojutsu
- Seigyoku-Oguri ryū sakkatsujutsu
