= Kodachi =

Kodachi (小太刀, こだち)
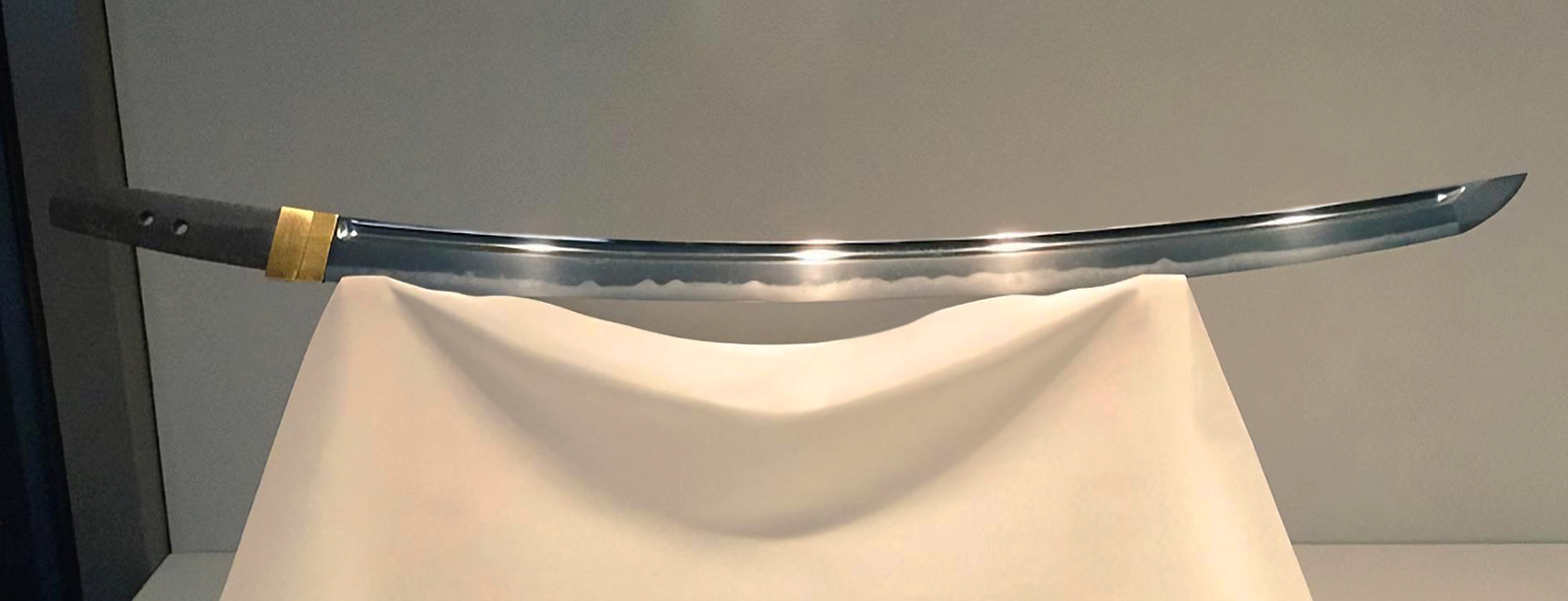
- Kodachi "Hachiya Nagamitsu" 13th century, Tokyo National Museum
- Type: Small sword
- Place of origin: Japan

Service history
- Used by: Samurai, Onna-musha

Production history
- Produced: Kamakura period (1185–1333) to present.

Specifications
- Mass: 280 g (9.9 oz) and more
- Length: 85 cm (33 in)
- Blade length: 40 to 60 cm (16 to 24 in) (shorter than 2 shaku)
- Blade type: Curved, single-edged
- Hilt type: Metal, wood, ray skin (same), silk, cotton
- Scabbard/sheath: Lacquered wood

A Kodachi (小太刀, こだち), literally translating into "small or short tachi (sword)", is one of the traditionally made Japanese swords (nihontō) used by the samurai class of feudal Japan. Kodachi are from the early Kamakura period (1185–1333) and are in the shape of a tachi. Kodachi are mounted in tachi style, but with a length of less than 60 cm (24 in). They are often confused with wakizashi, due to their length and handling techniques.

The exact use of the kodachi is unknown; it may have been preferred to be worn in court by the noble class, or kuge, in Kyoto, and or it may have been worn by adolescent samurai. The location of the smith's signature indicates that the Kodachi was worn edge down, unlike a wakizashi. Kodachi appear to have been produced only in a certain time period by higher quality craftsmen within specific schools of swordsmithing. Other theories indicate it was meant to be worn by nobles when traveling in confined spaces, such as an ox cart.

== See also ==
- List of daggers
- Types of swords
- Tsurugi

== External weapons ==
- Media related to Kodachi at Wikimedia Commons
