= Serge Mol =

Belgian martial artist

- Born: 1970 (age 54–55); Belgium
- Style: Koryū: jūjutsu, and others
- Teacher(s): Fumon Tanaka, Atsumi Nakashima
- Rank: Enshin-ryū Iaijutsu, suemonogiri, kenpō & yawara-jutsu: Menkyo kaiden; Hōki-ryū jūjutsu: Menkyo

Other information
- Occupation: jūjutsuka, koryū martial arts author & instructor, accountant
- Website: www.eibusha.com

Serge Mol (/'sərdʒ 'mɑl /; katakana: セルジェ・モル; Russian: Серге Молл) (born 1970) is a dedicated martial artist, martial arts historian and martial arts book author from Belgium. He is among a select number of Westerners who hold authentic Japanese credentials in koryū martial arts. He is the first non-Japanese person who has received the top-rank of menkyo kaiden in Enshin-ryū Iaijutsu, suemonogiri, kenpō, and yawara-jutsu. He also holds the rank of menkyo in Hōki-ryū jūjutsu. Mol has trained jūjutsu for more than 30 years. He has also studied various gendai budō such as the modern kendō, iaidō and jodō. In order to immerse himself in Japanese culture Mol lived for several years in Japan, where he was a disciple of the Japanese grandmasters Fumon Tanaka and Atsumi Nakashima.

Mol is also a collector of authentic historic Japanese martial arts manuscripts from various jūjutsu schools and other martial arts. He has also built out a large collection of period Japanese arms and armor.

Today, Mol lives with his family in Belgium, where he is a writer and teacher of classical martial arts. He is one of only three Belgians with known authentic Japanese koryū credentials, the other two being Dr. Guy Buyens (Hontai Yōshin-ryū) and Dr. Carl De Crée (Tenjin Shin’yō-ryū of the Inoue Keitarō-lineage and Owari-ha Yagyū Shinkage-ryū). Mol still regularly travels to Japan to find new sources to underpin his continuing research into the ancient Japanese martial culture.

== Bibliography ==
=== Literature ===
- Mol, Serge (2016). Takeda Shinobi Hiden: Unveiling Takeda Shingen's Secret Ninja Legacy. Eibusha. pp. 1–192. ISBN 978-90-813361-3-0.
- Mol, Serge (2013). Bujutsu densho: Exploring the Written Tradition of Japan's Martial Arts Culture. Eibusha. pp. 1–136. ISBN 978-90-8133612-3.
- Mol, Serge (2010). Classical swordsmanship of Japan: A Comprehensive Guide to Kenjutsu and Iaijutsu. Eibusha. pp. 1–320. ISBN 978-90-8133611-6.
- Mol, Serge (2008). Invisible armor: An Introduction to the Esoteric Dimension of Japan's Classical Warrior Arts. Eibusha. pp. 1–160. ISBN 978-90-8133610-9.
- Mol, Serge (2003). Classical Weaponry of Japan: Special Weapons and Tactics of the Martial Arts. Kodansha. pp. 1–217. ISBN 4-7700-2941-1.
- Mol, Serge (2001). Classical Fighting Arts of Japan: A Complete Guide to Koryū Jūjutsu. Kodansha. pp. 1–242. ISBN 4-7700-2619-6.
