= Mugai ryu =

Japanese koryū martial art school

Mugai-ryū (無外流)
- Ko-ryū

Foundation
- Founder: Tsuji Gettan Sukemochi (辻月丹資茂)
- Date founded: 23 June 1680
- Period founded: Mid-Edo period (1603–1868)

Arts taught
- Art: Description
- Kenjutsu - Tachi, Wakizashi: Sword martial art; with long sword, short sword.

Ancestor schools
- Yamaguchi-ryū • Ittō-ryū Mugai-ryū curriculum. Shinkage-ryū • Awaga-ryū • Kashima Shintō-ryū Yamaguchi-ryū influences.

Descendant schools
- Ōdachi-ryū

Mugai-ryū (無外流, Mugai-ryū) or "Outer Nothingness School" is a Japanese koryū martial art school founded by Tsuji Gettan Sukemochi (辻月丹資茂) on 23 June 1680. Its formal name is Mugai Shinden Kenpō (無外真伝剣法).

== History ==
The founder of Mugai-ryū, Tsuji Gettan Sukemochi (辻月丹資茂) was born to Tsuji Yadayū, a descendant of Sasaki Shirō Tadatsuna, in the first year of Keian (1648, early Edo period), in the Masugi (馬杉) village area of Miyamura (宮村) in the Kōga (甲賀郡) region of Ōmi (近江), now Shiga Prefecture.

When he was 13, he went to Kyoto to study swordsmanship, and at the age of 26 he received kaiden (full transmission) and opened a school in Edo (now Tokyo). Which school he studied is unclear. The most accepted theory is that he learned Yamaguchi-ryū (Note: Some call Yamaguchi-ryū "Yamaguchi Ittō-ryū", though this seems to be an informal name, since it is not seen in old documents. Nakayama Hakudō, one of the most proeminent swordsmen of the early 20th century, is said to have trained in Yamaguchi Ittō-ryū under the instruction of Saitō Risuke, before starting his training in Shintō Munen-ryū under Negishi Shingorō.) swordsmanship under Yamaguchi Bokushinsai, but earlier documents state he studied under Itō Taizen.

Also, he studied Zen Buddhism and Classical Chinese literature under Zen monks Sekitan Ryōzen (石潭良全) and Shinshū (神州) at Kyūkōji temple (吸江寺) in Azabu Sakurada-chō (麻布桜田町). At the age of 32, he reached enlightenment and received from his Zen teacher a formal poem taken from the Buddhist scriptures as an acknowledgment and proof of his accomplishment. Tsuji Gettan Sukemochi used the word Mugai from this poem as his nom de plume, and hence, later generations alluded to his swordsmanship teachings as being "the style of (Tsuji) Mugai", or Mugai-ryū.

The name "Mugai" comes from the following poem:

一法実無外
乾坤得一貞
吸毛方納密
動着則光清

"Ippō wa jitsu ni hoka nashi (Note: "Hoka nashi" means literally "Nothing other (outside)" and can be read as mugai, hence Tsuji's nom de plume.)
Kenkon ni ittei wo eru
Suimō wa hō ni mitsu ni osamu
Dōchaku sureba sunawachi hikari kiyoshi"

"There is nothing other than the One True Way
As vast as Heaven and Earth may be, only the Way can create this single Righteous Virtue
The One True Way dwells in our hearts and its sharpness can slice a fluttering feather in two

And the purest light radiates whenever It manifests"

The earlier documents on the school opened by Tsuji Gettan were lost in 1695, when a great fire hit Edo. Later records show that he had 32 daimyō (Note: Daimyō (大名) were feudal lords having over 10,000 koku as stipend/territory.) as pupils, including the rōjū (Note: Rōjū (老中) was an Elder, one of the highest administrative ranks in the Tokugawa Shogunate.) Ogasawara Sado-no-kami Nagashige, Sakai Kageyu Tadataka, the feudal lord of Maebashi, and Yamauchi Toyomasa, the feudal lord of Tosa. The list also included 150 jikisan, (Note: Jikisan (直参) were the Shōgun's direct vassals with stipends below 10,000 koku.) and 932 baishin. (Note: Baishin (陪臣) were the vassals of feudal lords.)

Tsuji Gettan Sukemochi was known not just as a master of the sword, but as an enlightened Zen philosopher and scholar—his writing Mugai Shinden Kenpō Ketsu (Note: 無外真伝剣法訣, lit. "The core sword techniques truly transmitted by Mugai".) shows heavy influences from Zen and Chinese philosophy.

He died on June 23 in the 12th year of Kyōhō 享保 (1725) at the age of 79. The tombs of Tsuji Gettan Sukemochi's successors are kept at the Nyoraiji temple (如来寺), which is now in Nishiōi (西大井町), Shinagawa (品川区), Tokyo.

Tsuji Gettan Sukemochi was unmarried and it is assumed that he had no offspring, as he adopted the eldest son of priest Sawatari Bungo-no-kami (猿渡豊後守), of Ōkunitama Shrine (大国魂神社) in what is now known as the Tokyo provincial government area, as his son. Sawatari's eldest son took the name Tsuji Kimata Sukehide (都治記摩多資英) (Note: Note that the spelling of Kimata's family name is different from Gettan's.) and became one of Tsuji Gettan's successors, along with Gettan's nephew, Tsuji Uheita (辻右平太).

Tsuji's school spread mainly in four domains: Himeji (now a city in Hyogo Prefecture), Isezaki (now part of Gunma Prefecture), Koromo (now Toyota city of Aichi Prefecture) and Tosa (now Kochi Prefecture).

In the Meiji era, two of the most famous swordsmen in Japan were from Mugai-ryū, both being appointed as Hanshi by Dai Nippon Butokukai: Takahashi Kyūtarō (1859–1940) from Himeji and Kawasaki Zensaburō (1860–1944) from Tosa. The lineage of Takahashi Kyūtarō was kept by his grandson, Takahashi Hidezō, Hanshi of Zen Nihon Kendō Renmei.

== Mugai Shinden Kenpō Curriculum ==
The school has only kenjutsu in its curriculum, having adopted the Jikyō-ryū (自鏡流) school of iaijutsu as a complement, and it has a strong connection with Zen due to Gettan's belief that the "sword and Zen are the way of the same Truth".

The curriculum of Mugai-ryū consists of 10 techniques with a long sword and 3 techniques with a short sword. Later, the techniques for duels (shiaiguchi 試合口) were also added.

An analysis of the techniques present in Mugai-ryū shows a clear influence of Ittō-ryū, so either the Yamaguchi-ryū studied by Tsuji was a derivation of Ittō-ryū, (Note: In this case, the Yamaguchi-ryū learned by Tsuji Gettan is highly unlikely to be the school founded by Yamaguchi Umanosuke Ietoshi, since this one is based primary in nitō (two swords) techniques. Little to nothing is known about who actually Yamaguchi Bokushinsai was.) or Itō Taizen was a master of this style. (Note: Given that the founder of Ittō-ryū was a man called Itō Ittōsai, Itō Taizen may be someone from the Itō-ha (also known as Chūya-ha) Ittō-ryū. However, Itō Taizen is a man shrouded in more mystery than Yamaguchi Bokushinsai.)

The scarce number of techniques in Mugai-ryū (Note: Only 13 techniques, excluding variations and the dueling techniques. Compare with other schools, like Ono-ha Ittō-ryū or Yagyū Shinkage-ryū.) reflects Tsuji Gettan's philosophy on the actual effectiveness of techniques, as well as his methods of teaching and grading.

== About Jikyō-ryū iaijutsu ==
Jikyō-ryu (自鏡流) is a school of iaijutsu founded by Taga Jikyōken Morimasa (多賀自鏡軒盛政), being a derivation of the Shin Tamiya-ryū (新田宮流) school. Taga is said to have taught iaijutsu to Tsuji Gettan while in Edo. The Takahashi lineage of Mugai-ryū kenjutsu learned iai from the Yamamura lineage of Jikyō-ryū, generation after generation.

Jikyō-ryū's base curriculum features two sections, which comprises two sets each. They are, in order: Goka 五箇 (5 techniques), Kumiai 組合 (15 techniques), Goyō 五用 (7 techniques) and Naiden 内伝 (14 techniques). (Note: For an incomplete list of the Jikyō-ryū techniques, refer to: Shinichi, Nakagawa. "Mugai Zensho", Ryoso Kenyukai, 1938, or to: Shinichi, Nakagawa. "Mugai Shinden Iai Hyōdō-kō". Mugai-kai, 1966.) After those, there is a further "set", taught only to the most advanced students. (Note: Refer to the corresponding Jikyō-ryū densho.)

Although this school is usually known as being associated to the Mugai-ryū, it is a school on its own. Its most famous lineage is the Yamamura lineage, but there are other lesser known lineages.

== About Mugai-ryū Iai Hyōdō ==
Mugai-ryū Iai Hyōdō (Mugai Shinden Iai Hyōdō 無外真伝居合兵道) is a modern school of iaido founded by Nakagawa Shiryō Shinichi (中川士龍申一, 1895–1981). Nakagawa was, in his youth, a kendo disciple of Takahashi Kyutarō, but he chose to focus on the iaijutsu techniques that Takahashi knew. Based on those, Nakagawa created Mugai-ryū Iai Hyōdō. (Note: Takahashi's iai techniques are from the Jikyō-ryū (see section on Jikyō-ryū) and can be seen at: Shinichi, Nakagawa. "Mugai Zensho", Ryoso Kenyukai, 1938.)

Nakagawa's lineage was in one time passed to Ishii Gogetsu Zenzō (石井悟月善蔵) in the late 1950s. However, this is revoked by Nakagawa Shinichi himself later on.

Today Mugai-ryū has splintered into several lines (Note: Roughly speaking, there are three major lines: one from Mugai-kai members (like Nakatani, Shirai, Ohno, Toda, Okamoto and others, one derived from Ishii Gogetsu Zenzō, and another from Shiokawa Hōshō Terushige) and for about 22 years there is no sōke(representative). For about two decades, Nakagawa Shiryō Shinichi is generally considered the last sōke. (Note: He would be the first and the last sōke of Mugai-ryū Iai Hyōdō. However, in Mugai-ryū Iai Hyōdō's lore, the school is directly related to Tsuji Gettan. Therefore, he's not considered as the first sōke in the school, but Tsuji instead.) He did not appoint a successor, but awarded several menkyo kaiden (full transmission), and his students continue to teach the school. But somehow several new lines have been established, because a few of them appointed their own self as the sōke of their Mugai Ryu lineage. Although Nakagawa Shinichi actually founded an organization called Mugai Kai to help preserve and maintain the school.

Eventually, in 2003, The Nakagawa family representative, Nakagawa Sohei (Nakagawa Shinichi's son), settling the confusion about the rightful Mugai Ryu lineage that had been going for decades. By choosing the next Mugai Ryu Soke, the 12th soke of Mugai Ryu is now Nakatani Yoshitaro, a direct student of Nakagawa Shinichi, and that time also the head of Mugai-kai. In 2 June 2024, Nakatani Yoshitaro as the rightful soke, changed the name from Mugai-kai into Ryuo-kai.

Although there are some minor variations according to the lineage, the base curriculum of the school can be considered as follows:

Go-yō 五用	Go-ka 五箇	Go-ō 五応	Hashiri-gakari 走り掛り	Iai no kata (kumitachi) 居合之形	Wakizashi no kata 脇差之形
Shin 真	Suigetsu 水月	Muna-zukushi 胸尽し	Maegoshi 前腰	Hokuto 北斗	Kiridome 切留
Ren 連	Inchūyō 陰中陽	En-yō 円要	Musōgaeshi 夢想返し	Taihaku 太白	Tsukidome 突留
Sa 左	Yōchūin 陽中陰	Ryō-guruma 両車	Mawarigakari 廻懸り	Inazuma 稲妻	Ukenagashi 受流
Yū 右	Hibiki-gaeshi 響返し	No-okuri 野送り	Migi no Teki 右の敵	Kasumi 霞	Kiriage 斬上
Sha 捨	Hazumi 破図味	Gyokkō 玉光	Shihō 四方	Ryūsei 流星	Kuraizume 位詰

Apart from these, there is a set called Naiden (内伝), taught only for the advanced students. (Note: Originally, there were three techniques in this set. Now, depending on the original lineage, or the separated lineage, there may be more techniques. Some names that can be seen as part of the Naiden set areSangyō-icchi, Kaminoto, Banpō Kiittō which is the original Mugai Ryu Iaihyodo one, then Tsukikage Kannō, Shōfū, which is created by Ishii Gogetsu, and Jinrai that newly created by Shiokawa Hosho. Some lineages separate those in Naiden and Okuden (奥伝).)

== The differences between Mugai-ryū Kenjutsu, Jikyō-ryū Iaijutsu and Mugai-ryū Iai Hyōdō ==
Mugai-ryū Kenjutsu, Jikyō-ryū Iaijutsu and Mugai-ryū Iai Hyōdō are three separate entities, being distinct from each other.

Mugai-ryū kenjutsu (Mugai Shinden Kenpō) is a school of kenjutsu whose practitioners also studied Jikyō-ryū iaijutsu. Mugai-ryū Iai Hyōdō (Mugai Shinden Iai Hyōdō) is a gendai budo (modern school) of iaido, being named after the kenjutsu school due to the fact that Nakagawa Shinichi's kendo teacher was from Mugai-ryū kenjutsu.

Although the lore in Mugai-ryu Iai Hyōdō traditionally places its founder as Tsuji Gettan Sukemochi, this is historically inaccurate. Nakagawa himself states several times that "Mugai-ryū is actually Jikyō-ryū", (Note: For instance, refer to: Shinichi, Nakagawa. "Mugai Shinden Iai Hyōdō-kō". Mugai-kai, 1966, p83 and p93.) hence the Mugai Shinden Iai Hyōdō must be seen as a different school from the Mugai Shinden Kenpō, which is a school of kenjutsu.

However, while it can be said that Mugai-ryū Iai Hyōdō was created based on some of the Jikyō-ryū techniques, making several techniques visually similar, both schools are completely different. This can be seen in the actual techniques, as well as their uses, interpretations and variations, and in other teachings.

For instance, a glance at the names of the techniques shows that Mugai-ryū Iai Hyōdō altered the order of the curriculum, (Note: While this may seem relatively harmless at first sight, altering the order of the curriculum means that the entire teaching system and the school's structure are altered from their foundation, thus becoming an entirely different system. Just think of an educational system having college before high school, or elementary school before junior high, and so on.) removed and rearranged several Jikyō-ryū techniques and added new ones.

The following table maps some of the Mugai-ryū Iai Hyōdō techniques' names to the original Jikyō-ryū curriculum:

Technique	Mugai-ryū Iai Hyōdō set	Jikyō-ryū original set
Shin 真	Go-yō 五用	Goyō 五用
Ren 連	Go-yō 五用	Goyō 五用
Sa 左	Go-yō 五用	Goka 五箇 and Goyō 五用
Yū 右	Go-yō 五用	Goka 五箇 and Goyō 五用
Sha 捨	Go-yō 五用	Goyō 五用 (Note: Although Shin, Ren, Sa, Yū and Sha appear in the Goyō set of both schools, their order is different in the Jikyō-ryū original set, as well as their use.)
Suigetsu 水月	Go-ka 五箇	Naiden 内伝
Inchūyō 陰中陽	Go-ka 五箇	Naiden 内伝
Yōchūin 陽中陰	Go-ka 五箇	Naiden 内伝
Hibiki-gaeshi 響返し	Go-ka 五箇	Naiden 内伝
Hazumi 破図味	Go-ka 五箇	Goyō 五用 (Note: In Jikyō-ryū, Hazumi has a nontrivial place in the Goyō set.)
Muna-zukushi 胸尽し	Go-ō 五応	Kumiai 組合
En-yō 円要	Go-ō 五応	Naiden 内伝
Ryō-guruma 両車 (Note: Read as Ryōsha in Jikyō-ryū.)	Go-ō 五応	Naiden 内伝
No-okuri 野送り	Go-ō 五応	Kumiai 組合
Gyokkō 玉光	Go-ō 五応	Naiden 内伝

=== Notes on differences ===
1. Although they may share the same name, the actual technique from Jikyō-ryū may differ in its entirety from the Mugai-ryu homonymous.
2. There is no set called Go-ō 五応 in Jikyō-ryū.
3. The Mugai-ryū's Hashiri-gakari (走り掛り), Iai no kata (kumitachi)(居合之形) and the Wakizashi no kata (脇差之形) sets do not exist in Jikyō-ryū and neither do they have any homonymous technique in the Jikyō-ryū curriculum.
4. There are other sets in Jikyō-ryū that are not present in Mugai-ryū Iai Hyōdō.

Also, although Nakagawa had access to several Jikyō-ryū's densho (scrolls and manuscripts), he was not fully instructed in them. This is apparent in his explanation of the densho called Yōhō(Mochiikata) Nijūgoka-ji(Nijūgoka no koto) (用方二十五箇事), where he admits his ignorance about the concept of "misumi" (三角), for instance. (Note: For Nakagawa's explanations, refer to: Shinichi, Nakagawa. "Mugai Shinden Iai Hyōdō-kō". Mugai-kai, 1966) Other evidences of his incomplete instruction can be seen in his explanation on the length of the sword and on the sageo(下緒), both lacking crucial information for a true Jikyō-ryū practitioner, among other teachings and oral instructions that are not seen in Mugai-ryū Iai Hyōdō. (Note: Just for reference, misumi refers to a specific shape for the transversal section of the sword. The length of the blade in Jikyō-ryū is fixed, both for tachi and wakizashi, and the sageo has some unique specifications for the school. Refer to the appropriate Jikyō-ryū densho.)

The grading system used in Mugai-ryū Iai Hyōdō is based on the modern dan/kyū systems of modern martial arts like judo and kendo. Jikyō-ryū and Mugai Shinden Kenpō employ an older grading system, used during the Tokugawa Shogunate.
