= Guy Buyens =

Belgian Karateka and physician

- Born: 5 May 1961 (age 64); Vilvoorde, Belgium
- Style: Karatedō, koryū: jūjutsu, bōjutsu, iaijutsu
- Teachers: Ken’ei Mabuni, Kyōichi Munenori Inoue, Tsuyoshi Munetoshi Inoue
- Rank: 6th dan in Shitō-ryū karatedō & 6th dan chūden in Hontai Yōshin-ryū

Other information
- Occupation: sports physician, jūjutsuka, koryū martial arts instructor
- Website: hontaiyoshinryu.be

Guy Buyens (born 5 May 1961, in Vilvoorde) is a Belgian sports physician, medical administrator, and martial arts practitioner and teacher, who specializes in traditional Japanese martial arts.

== Life ==
Buyens attended the Atheneum (Vilvoorde) and the Vrije Universiteit Brussel (Brussels), graduating with a medical degree in July 1986. He earned a post-graduate degree in sports medicine afterwards.

From 1992 to 2008, Buyens worked in the Pharmaceutical and Biotechnology Industry. Since 2009 he has been the Director of AZ Jan Portaels, a general hospital located in Vilvoorde, Belgium.

Buyens started martial arts (karatedō) in 1971 at the age of 10. In his youth he participated in several karatedō competitive events including the European championships in Paris in 1984. In 1983, he was participating in a demonstration of Shitō-ryū karatedō with the late Sohan Eiji Ogasahara, 9th dan, and Hidetoshi Nakahashi, 6th dan (currently 9th dan) in Italy. At that occasion he also witnessed a demonstration of Hontai Yōshin-ryū, a koryū or traditional Japanese martial art. The group was led by its sōke, Tsuyoshi Munetoshi Inoue, and left a deep impression on Buyens.

After finishing his medical training and while working at the University of Brussels, Buyens took out a 1-year sabbatical to study Shitō-ryū karatedō with Ken’ei Mabuni-sensei (son of the founder) in Ōsaka, Japan. Close to Ōsaka, in Nishinomiya, is where Hontai Yōshin-ryū’s Imazu dōjō was located, which Buyens joined to study bōjutsu and iaidō with Kyōichi Munenori Inoue, the son of the ryū’s sōke, Tsuyoshi Munetoshi Inoue. He received iaidō-training from the late Kukio Kurishima, who had expertise in Toyama-ryū iaidō and Hontai Yōshin-ryū. He participated in several Japanese enbu, such as notably, the 16th Isukushima Enbu Taikai in Miyajima (2005), and the 30th (2007) and 32nd (2009) Nihon Kobudō Kyōkai enbu in Tōkyō.

Buyens is among a select number of Westerners who hold authentic Japanese credentials in koryū martial arts. Buyens currently holds the ranks of 6th dan in Shitō-ryū karatedō (from Ken’ei Mabuni) and of 6th dan/chūden in Hontai Yōshin-ryū. He is one of only three Belgians with verified authentic Japanese koryū credentials, the other two being Serge Mol (Enshin-ryū and Hōki-ryū jūjutsu) and Dr. Carl De Crée (Tenjin Shin’yō-ryū of the Inoue Keitarō-lineage and Owari-ha Yagyū Shinkage-ryū).

== Bibliography ==
- Buyens, Guy (2008). "Hontai Yoshin-ryu Jujutsu". Koryu.com.
