= Kage-ryū =

Martial art discipline

Kage-ryū (影流) is a Japanese koryū martial art founded in the late Muromachi period c. 1550 by Yamamoto Hisaya Masakatsu.

== About ==
The system teaches battojutsu using very long swords known as choken.

The kanji for Choken Battojutsu Kageryū (景流) means keshiki, or a scene. This is the original name of a ryū from Yanagawa fief in Kyushu and it has not been changed since inception in the mid sixteenth century. There are many makimono (scrolls) and manuscripts and other evidence that contain the teachings of the school. The tradition also includes oral teachings (kuden) that have been handed down throughout the generations.

== History ==
The founder of the Kageryū was Yamamoto Hisaya Masakatsu of Akizuki domain. It is said that Yamamoto had observed a "scene" of a monkey reaching out with stick to retrieve a fruit from a tree. He then had the idea to use a longer weapon to "reach out". Others may hasten to add that a long blade is impractical. However, the added advantage is that, in learning to use a longer, heavier blade, a smaller, shorter one becomes even easier to wield.

The Tokugawa shogunate standardized the size of swords in Japan to jo-sun. This is written as tei-sun meaning designated length. This was 2 shaku 3 sun (64.7 cm). (Note: one shaku is just under a foot, whereas one sun is just under one and a quarter inches)

The previous shihan Takamuku Mioji has died, also previous kaiin (members) (Note: The word kaiin means "member" [of school] in context of Kage-ryū. The ryū has only shihan and kaiin; there are no dan ranks like in modern budo.) have died or no longer studying. The new shihan who is still working to preserve living tradition is connected to the Tachibana clan and has kaiin in Canada, Japan and the U.S.A.

Another ryu practiced in the Yanagawa Fief is Oishi Shinkage-ryū Kenjutsu. The founder, Oishi Susumu, was a Burakucho of Miike Han (三池) which is present day Arao City, Kumamoto.

== See also ==
- Japanese martial arts terms
- Tachibana clan (samurai)
- Miike coal mine
- Oishi Shinkage-ryū Kenjutsu
