= Shinto-ryu =

Shinto-ryu can refer to several styles of classical Japanese swordsmanship used by the samurai:

- Tenshin Shōden Katori Shintō-ryū
- Kashima Shintō-ryū
- Kasumi Shintō-ryū Kenjutsu
- Hyōhō Niten Ichi-ryū

or to some other martial art:

- Shintō Musō-ryū, a school of jōjutsu
- Shindo Ryu, a modern style of karate
- Shinto Ryu, a modern style of Taijutsu

== See also ==
- Koryū
