= Yagyū Shingan-ryū =

Traditional school of Japanese martial arts

Yagyū Shingan-ryū (柳生心眼流)
- Ko-ryū
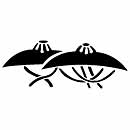

Foundation
- Founder: Takenaga Hayato (竹永 隼人); Araki Mataemon (荒木 又右衛門)
- Date founded: c.1600 (Early Edo Period)

Current information
- Current headmaster: Sendai-line: Hoshi Kunio II; Edo-line: Kajitsuka Yasushi
- Current headquarters: Sendai-line: Iwate Prefecture; Edo-line: Tochigi Prefecture

Arts taught
- Art: Description
- Yawara (Jujutsu): Unarmed combat with or without armor
- Kenjutsu: Swordsmanship
- Battōjutsu: Sword Drawing Techniques
- Bōjutsu: Staff Fighting
- Naginatajutsu: Glaive Fighting
- Sōjutsu: Spearmanship
- Torite: Arresting/Capturing
- Kappo: Healing/Resuscitation
- *Others: Various other arts (unlisted)

Ancestor schools
- Shindō-ryū • Yagyū Shinkage-ryū

Yagyū Shingan-ryū (柳生心眼流), is a traditional Samurai warrior tradition of ancient Japan (Kobudō). There are two distinct lineages of Yagyū Shingan-ryū known as Sendai-Heihojutsu and Edo-Taijutsu.

The term shingan (心眼) has its roots in Japanese Zen Buddhism, and refers to an ability to see and sense via the mind's eye. It was originally known as Shingan-ryū, but the honorary Yagyu surname was later attached with the permission of the founder's mentor. The Sendai branch states that Yagyū Munenori granted this approval to Takenaga Hayato, whereas the Edo lineage states it was Yagyū Jūbei Mitsuyoshi who gave permission to Araki Mataemon.

Yagyū Shingan-ryū was originally created as a comprehensive battlefield art, covering an array of skills and weapons. Grappling techniques focused on wrestling in full-armor and prepared foot soldiers for engagements on the battlefield. The techniques of Yagyū Shingan-ryū were designed to eliminate an enemy quickly and efficiently, employing sound body mechanics to off-balance and take down an adversary. As a military art, the techniques were unforgiving and lethal. The system consisted of classical jujutsu, quarterstaff fighting (bōjutsu), glaive fighting (naginatajutsu), sword drawing and cutting (iaijutsu) and sword fighting (kenjutsu).

== Takenaga Hayato ==
Takenaga Hayato (竹永 隼人 / dates of birth and death unknown), is credited as the founder of Yagyū Shingan-ryū, which he taught primarily in what is now known as Sendai, Miyagi. Before creating the school, Hayato studied Shintō-ryū (神道流 / also pronounced Shindō-ryū), Shinkage-ryū - Divine Shadow school (神影流), Shuza-ryū (首座流), Toda-ryū (戸田流) and Edo line Yagyū Shinkage-ryū - New Shadow school (新陰流).

Takenaga Hayato was strongly influenced by the Shintō-ryū teachings of Ushū Tatewaki. Takenaga Hayato travelled to Edo and was employed by the Yagyū family. At this time, he studied Edo-den Yagyū Shinkage-ryū with Yagyū Munenori. According to legend, Yagyu Munenori suggested Takenaga affix the Yagyū family name to his new style, in honor of his achievements. On return to his hometown of Sendai, Miyagi, it is said that Takenaga taught Yagyū Shingan-ryū to infantry (ashigaru foot soldiers), until his death.

== Araki Mataemon ==
Araki Mataemon (荒木 又右衛門, 1594–1634) was a native of Araki Village in the feudal domain of Iga, Japan. It is said that he studied the Nakajo and Shinto schools of swordsmanship from an early age. The Araki clan had deep ties to Yagyū Shinkage-ryū. From the age of 15, Mataemon began his study of the Shinkage school under Yagyū Munenori., and later under Yagyū Jūbei Mitsuyoshi. Legend states that as a final test of skill, Munenori drew his sword and attacked Araki unexpectedly. Araki successfully defended himself using nothing more than a rolled-up piece of paper. Araki was appointed as an official swordsmanship instructor for the Yamato Koriyama Domain and received a stipend of 250 koku. Lord Matsudaira Tadaaki, grandson of Shogun Tokugawa Ieyasu and Daimyo of Yamoto Koriyama later adopted Araki, taking him as a son. Edo-den Yagyū Shingan-ryū credits Araki Mataemon as the spiritual patriarch of Yagyū Shingan-ryū. The name Araki-do is a title bestowed upon each Soke of the Edo-den tradition. The current Soke is Kajitsuka Yasushi, 11th in succession. A key differentiator between Edo-den Yagyū Shingan-ryū (Araki-do) and Sendai-den Yagyū Shingan-ryū is that the Edo-den requires the training and mastery of both Yagyū Shingan-ryū and Yagyū Shinkage-ryū. Historical records held by Edo-den Yagyū Shingan-ryū indicate that Yagyū Jubei granted permission for the Yagyū surname to be affixed to the Shingan school.

== Branches ==
There are two main lineages of Yagyū Shingan-ryū, The Sendai lineage, created by Takanaga Hayato, and the Edo lineage, founded by Koyama Samon (inspired by patriarch, Araki Mataemon).

=== Sendai Line (Heiho-jutsu) ===
During Japan's Sengoku period, Ushu Tatewaki (羽州帯刀), a native of Ushu, Shonai domain (羽州庄内), instructed Takenaga Hayato (竹永隼人) of Oshu, Sendai domain (奥州仙台) in the ways of the Shintō school (aka Shindō). It is said that after studying the Shintō-ryū (神道流), Shuza-ryū (首座流), Toda-ryū (戸田流) and Shinkage-ryū (神影流) schools, Takenaga Hayato went to Edo and studied the Yagyū Shinkage-ryū (柳生新陰流) from Yagyu Munenori. He later founded his own school known as Yagyū Shingan-ryū.

The Sendai teachings spread throughout the Tohoku region and over the centuries gave birth to numerous splinter groups. The Sendai tradition known as Heiho, meaning Way of War, consists of armored jujutsu and an array of weapon arts. This lineage is directed by Hoshi Kunio II, grandson of the late Hoshi Kunio I, who died in 2007. Kunio II is the 15th generation Soke and 5th descendant of the Hoshi family transmission. The headquarters is located in Ichinoseki City, Iwate Prefecture.

Two other prominent branches are the Yagyū Shingan-ryū Heihō-jutsu (Chikuosha) of the late Shimazu Kenji, Shihan (島津兼治) and the Yagyū Shingan-ryū Hei-jutsu (Dawadō) of the late Sato Kinbei, Shihan (佐藤金兵衛).

Shimazu Kenji (1938-2024) was a highly-respected elder within Japan's kobudo community, having dedicated his life to the growth & dissemination of the Yagyū Shingan-ryū tradition. His Chikuosha organization has branches in several countries, the primary locations being Australia & Sweden.

Sato Kinbei (1925-1999) was largely known in Japan as an authority on Chinese martial arts, having established the Ba Gua Zhang movement in Tokyo. Sato claimed mastery of dozens of schools, one of which was Yagyū Shingan-ryū.

=== Edo Line (Tai-jutsu) ===
Edo-den Yagyū Shingan-ryū is officially known in Japan as Yagyū Shingan-ryū Taijutsu (Araki-do) and is directed by 11th generation Soke, Kajitsuka Yasushi. This lineage stems directly from Koyama Samon (小山左門), the 4th generation Soke of Yagyū Shingan-ryū Heiho. Born in 1718 (the third year of the Kyoho era) in Ofunakoshi, Monou County, to the Koyama family of foot soldiers of the Sendai domain. He first studied under Endo Shigeshiro, and later under Ito Kyusaburo. Koyama Samon moved from Sendai to the capital of Edo (present day Tokyo), teaching Yagyū Shingan-ryū in Asakusa for 18 years. The waring periods had come to an end, and the capital of Edo became a symbol of peace and a center for cultural refinement. Training in a full suit of armor for battlefield engagements became less relevant and the school evolved into a more refined and efficient system, specializing in both armored and non-armored applications. Techniques for close-quarter combat were adopted, such as those used indoors, on streets or in narrow alleyways. The school became known as Yagyū Shingan-ryū Taijutsu, focusing on body mechanics and stressing directness, economy of motion, and energy conservation. With Yawara (柔) at its crux, the taijutsu system strives for minimum effort with maximum results. Koyama Samon died 19 March 1800, age 82. His Buddhist name was Ichiryuin Jokunyu Gakushin Koji.

Two well-known students of Yagyū Shingan-ryū Taijutsu were Ueshiba Morihei (founder of Aikido) and Kano Jigoro (founder of Judo). Ueshiba had trained under Masakatsu Nakai, during the reign of Araki-do 6th Soke, Goto Saburō. Kano received his training directly from Araki-do 7th Soke, Ohshima Masateru.

Meanwhile, Koyama Samon's Heiho teachings lived on and were passed down by Aizawa Nakanoshin Touken, who had carried the tradition to the Tome and Kurihara regions. It was here that Hoshi Hikojuro Kuniyuki (星彦十郎 國行), the 12th Soke of Sendai-den Yagyū Shingan-ryū Heiho received his training in the art.

In a nutshell, Yagyū Shingan-ryū Taijutsu should not be viewed as divergent from the Sendai tradition, but rather as a sister school, representing an evolved interpretation of Soke, Koyama Samon's experiences while living & teaching in the metropolis of ancient Edo.
