= Ōishi Shinkage-ryū Kenjutsu =

Traditional school of Japanese swordsmanship

Ōishi Shinkage-ryū (大石神影流)
- Ko-ryū

Foundation
- Founder: Ōishi Susumu Tanetsugu (c.1798–1865)
- Date founded: c.1840
- Period founded: late Edo period

Current information
- Current headmaster: Ōishi Kei (大石馨)

Arts taught
- Art: Description
- Kenjutsu: Sword art
- Iaijutsu: Sword drawing art

Ancestor schools
- Kage-ryū (Aizu)

Ōishi Shinkage-ryū (大石神影流) is a traditional school (koryū) of Japanese martial arts, founded by Ōishi Susumu Tanetsugu in the early 1800s.

== History ==
The origin of Ōishi Shinkage-ryū lies in Aizu Kage-ryū kenjutsu (swordsmanship), which was founded by Aizu Ikōsai Hisatada. Aizu Kage-ryū was transmitted to the founder by Murakami Ittō. He came to Yanagawa domain from the Ōoka domain and taught Aizu Kage-ryū kenjutsu, Oshima-ryū sōjutsu (use of spear) and Okuyama Shinkan-ryū jujutsu. One of his students was Ōishi Yuken who was a grandfather of Ōishi Susumu. Ōishi Yuken taught Ōishi Susumu his kenjutsu and sōjutsu arts. Both Susumu's grandfather and his father were instructors of the Yanagawa domain.

Ōishi Susumu improved the protective gear used during practice. In addition, he improved the fukuro shinai (a bamboo sword covered with leather) to a modern bamboo sword design. He devised thrusting techniques, and a technique for striking the opponent's torso. He was said to be five foot eleven inches tall (1.8 meters), a great height for a Japanese of his day. Therefore, his style of swordsmanship uses longer bamboo practice swords than most other styles. There are stories of him engaging in combat around Japan using his four shaku shinai (about 121 cm).

By the order of his feudal lord, he went to the capital, Edo in 1832. In the next year, he fought kenjutsu matches with many famous instructors. After Ōishi Susumu (Tanetsugu), his son, also named Ōishi Susume (Tanemasa), inherited the school. Because the latter didn’t have a son, his younger brother, Ōishi Yukie was placed as the next headmaster of the ryū. After the Meiji Restoration, they didn’t practice swordsmanship for some time, but the school survived still. When Ōishi Yukie died, his son, Ōishi Hajime was too young, so Itai Masumi, a pupil of Ōishi Yukie guarded the Ōishi Shinkage-ryū. After Ōishi Hajime had grown up, he inherited his father's martial art. He taught the ryū to his grandson, Ōishi Eiichi, who taught Ōishi Shinkage-ryū and Kendō in Ōmuta City. Ōishi Eiichi taught the Ōishi Shinkage-ryū to Morimoto Kunio. Morimoto Kunio received menkyo kaiden (highest teaching license) in 2010 and is currently the only actively teaching shihan of Ōishi Shinkage-ryū. The current sōke is Ōishi Kei, the granddaughter of Ōishi Eiichi.

== Lineage ==
Early history pre-dating Ōishi Shinkage-ryū:

1. Aizu Ikōsai (Founder of the school that Ōishi Susumu learned)
2. Okuyama Saemondayu
3. Kamiizumi Musashinokami
4. Nagao Mimasaka
5. Masunaga Hakuen
6. Masugaga Gunbei
7. Yoshida Masuemon
8. Ishihara Denjizaemon
9. Murakami Ittō
10. Ōishi Yuken
11. Ōishi Tarobei

From the founding of the school:

1. Ōishi Susumu Tanetsugu (Founder of the Ōishi Shinkage-ryū)
2. Ōishi Susumu Tanemasa
3. Ōishi Yukie
4. Itai Masumi
5. Ōishi Hajime
6. Ōishi Eiichi
7. Morimoto Kunio

== Technical characteristics ==
Ōishi Shinkage-ryū is a traditional school of swordsmanship. Its prominent features are techniques called morotezuki (a two-handed thrust), katatezuki (a one-handed thrust) and dōgiri (cutting the torso). These techniques were used by Ōishi Susumu for the first time in swordsmanship matches with the protective gear. Ōishi Susumu made 79 kata, which are called tekazu in Ōishi Shinkage-ryū.

Techniques of the Ōishi Shinkage-ryū kenjutsu include use of one sword with both hands, techniques to use two swords, saya-no-uchi (iai) and naginata. The first three groups of kata are the basis of the ryū.

=== Shiaiguchi（試合口） ===
Foundational kenjutsu techniques.

1. Isshin
2. Mumyouittou
3. Suigetsu
4. Suken
5. Ichimi

=== Yō-no-omote（陽之表：表拾本） ===
Intermediate kenjutsu techniques.

1. Youken
2. Gekken
3. Muniken
4. Nishou
5. Inazuma
6. Taiyouken
7. Seitouken
8. Muiken
9. Norimi
10. Chidori

=== Yō-no-ura（陽之裏） ===
Intermediate kenjutsu techniques.

1. Seiryu
2. Sachin
3. Jumonji
4. Harimi
5. Yoyami
6. Rankyoku
7. Kurai
8. Kyokuman
9. Ōtoshi
10. Byako

=== Sangakuen-no-tachi（三學圓之太刀） ===
Advanced kenjutsu techniques.

1. Ittōryōdan
2. Santan
3. Saitetsu
4. Hankai
5. Hankou
6. Usen
7. Saten
8. Choutan
9. Ichimi

=== Yari-awase（槍合） ===
Facing a spear.

1. Irikake
2. Uchikomi

=== Naginata-awase（長刀合） ===
Facing a glaive.

1. Koran
2. Hiryu

=== Bō-awase（棒合） ===
Facing a staff.

1. Uchiawase
2. Uchiiri
3. Enzan

=== Saya-no-uchi（鞘之内） ===
Iaijutsu. Sword drawing and cutting.

1. Nukiuchi
2. Koteotoshi
3. Uken
4. Saken
5. Kabutowari

=== Nitō（二刀） ===
Fighting with both swords.

1. Seifu
2. Ayanochoushi
3. Momijigasane
4. Kasumi
5. Ariake

=== Tengu-no-shou（天狗抄） ===
Advanced kenjutsu techniques.

1. Hishou
2. Gyakufu
3. Ransetsu
4. Takanami
5. Joboku
6. Sasetsudan
7. Sasetsudan
8. Enki
9. Marubashi
10. Orihakou

=== Kodachi（小太刀） ===
Using the short sword.

1. Mouko
2. Kotsubogaeshi
3. Engetsu
4. Jushi
5. Kyoujaku

=== Shindensaiso（神傳截相） ===
Highest kenjutsu techniques.

1. Enpi
2. Enkai
3. Yamagata
4. Tsuikage
5. Ukifune
6. Uranami
7. Rangyou
8. Matsukaze
9. Kasha
10. Chotan
11. Tettei
12. Isononami
13. Seigan

== Ranking System ==
1. Kirimokuroku (截目録, “half-catalog”, the shōden (beginning) level)
2. Yō-no-Maki (陽之巻, “Sun Scroll”, the chūden (intermediate) level)
3. Menkyo Kaiden In-no-Maki (免許皆伝陰之巻, License of Complete Transmission, “Moon Scroll”)

== Famous Students of the Style ==
- Yoshida Tōyō
- Higuchi Shinkichi
- Kataoka Kenkichi

== See also ==
- Shinkage-ryū
