= Marobashi =

Marobashi or marubashi is a philosophical concept derived from Japanese martial arts, especially kendo. The term can meaning to be "without form" in some contexts, or to follow "the way of nature, freedom and energy in life", and can denotes a state of Zen enlightenment. In many Japanese arts, to achieve marobashi was to have reached the apex of artistic/martial development.

In some ways, marobashi can be related to other similar cultural plateaus such as Enlightenment or Bodhidharma. In traditional cultural reference, the Japanese refer to marobashi as the culmination of training or practice in which the practitioner is able to execute without thought, without kata, upon something even smaller than intuition. In this place, the self ceases to exist, and marobashi takes over.

== Origin ==
References to marobashi are found in kendo texts from various periods. In particular, the reference to "marobashi-no-michi" (bridge round like a boulder) or "being without form" originates from within the text "The Sword & The Mind", a collection of various texts covering the extended warring periods of the mid fifteenth to the seventeenth centuries of feudal Japan.

Kamiizumi Ise-no-Kami Nobutsuna applied marobashi-no-michi from the Kage-ryu as a founding principle for Shinkage-ryū school of fencing he founded. Kamiizumi gained "full-understanding" of marobashi upon his realization that Zen and the philosophy of Sun Tzu as understood in the Ogasawara school merged in the Enkai-no-Tachi technique of the Kage-ryu.

His successor, Yagyū Munetoshi also uses the term marobashi-no-michi to describe the zen state of oneness. Miyamoto Musashi, arguably the most renowned of the Japanese Samurai caste, spent much of his life perfecting what he called the way of strategy, the basis for which is found at the heart of "The Sword & The Mind". Musashi describes the state of marobashi as iwo no mi, or "body of a boulder".

== Non martial usage ==
Marobashi is not exclusive to the swordsman, however. In its most benign form, marobashi can be found almost every aspect of life, and indeed, permeates all things, according to the masters of their day. The concept, by its very definition, is just beyond the grasping of everything, a state to aspire towards when yet already a part of. This is marobashi in its purest form.
