= Buyens =

Buyens is a surname. Notable people with the surname include:

- Alois G. Buyens, Belgian sculptor, creator of Columbus Monument
- Guy Buyens (born 1961), Belgian karateka and physician
- Jacob Buyens van Mol (died 1604), Flemish Dominican friar, priest and writer
- Yoni Buyens (born 1988), Belgian footballer
