= Kage-ryū (Aizu) =

Traditional school of Japanese swordsmanship

Kage-ryū (陰流)
- Ko-ryū

Foundation
- Founder: Aizu Hyūga-no-Kami Iko (c.1452–1538)
- Date founded: c.1490
- Period founded: Sengoku period (mid-15th century–mid-17th century)

Current information
- Current headmaster: None
- Current headquarters: None

Arts taught
- Art: Description
- Kenjutsu: Sword art

Descendant schools
- Yagyū Shinkage-ryū • Kashima Shinden Jikishinkage-ryū • Oishi Shinkage-ryū Kenjutsu

Kage-ryū (陰流) is a traditional school (koryū) of swordsmanship (kenjutsu) founded by Aizu Hyūga-no-Kami Iko (c. 1452–1538) in c. 1490. This school is also sometimes called Aizu Kage-ryū after the name of its founder. The founder was also known as Aizu Ikōsai Hisatada, and his surname is sometimes written as "Aisu" instead of "Aizu".

== Legacy ==
Aizu had two primary students, his son Aizu Koshichiro, and Kamiizumi Hidetsugu --also known as Kamiizumi Ise-no-Kami Nobutsuna -- a famous swordsman and founder of Shinkage-ryū (新陰流), which would be renamed Yagyū Shinkage-ryū by Nobutsuna's equally famous student Yagyū Sekishūsai Muneyoshi.

== Modern practice ==
Today, the Kage-ryū of Aizu Hyūga-no-Kami Iko exists only through its influence of later schools of swordsmanship, such as Yagyū Shinkage-ryū and Kashima Shinden Jikishinkage-ryū, and the many schools that they in turn influenced.
