= Aisu =

Aisu is both a given name and a surname. Notable people with the name include:

- Aisu Iko (1452–1538), Japanese martial artist
- Thomas Aisu (1954–2018), Ugandan medical doctor
