= Takenaga =

Takenaga is a Japanese surname and masculine given name. It can be written with a few different kanji, for example bamboo–eternal (竹永) and martial–chief (武長).

== People with the surname ==
- Barbara Takenaga (born 1949), abstract painter
- Takenaga Hayato (竹永 隼人), founder of the Yagyū Shingan-ryū martial arts tradition
- Masaharu Takenaga, commander of the World-War-II Japanese battalion that surrendered in the Takenaga incident

== Fictional characters with the given name ==
- Takenaga Oda (織田 武長), character in the manga The Wallflower
