= Miyako Ko-ryū =

Japanese school

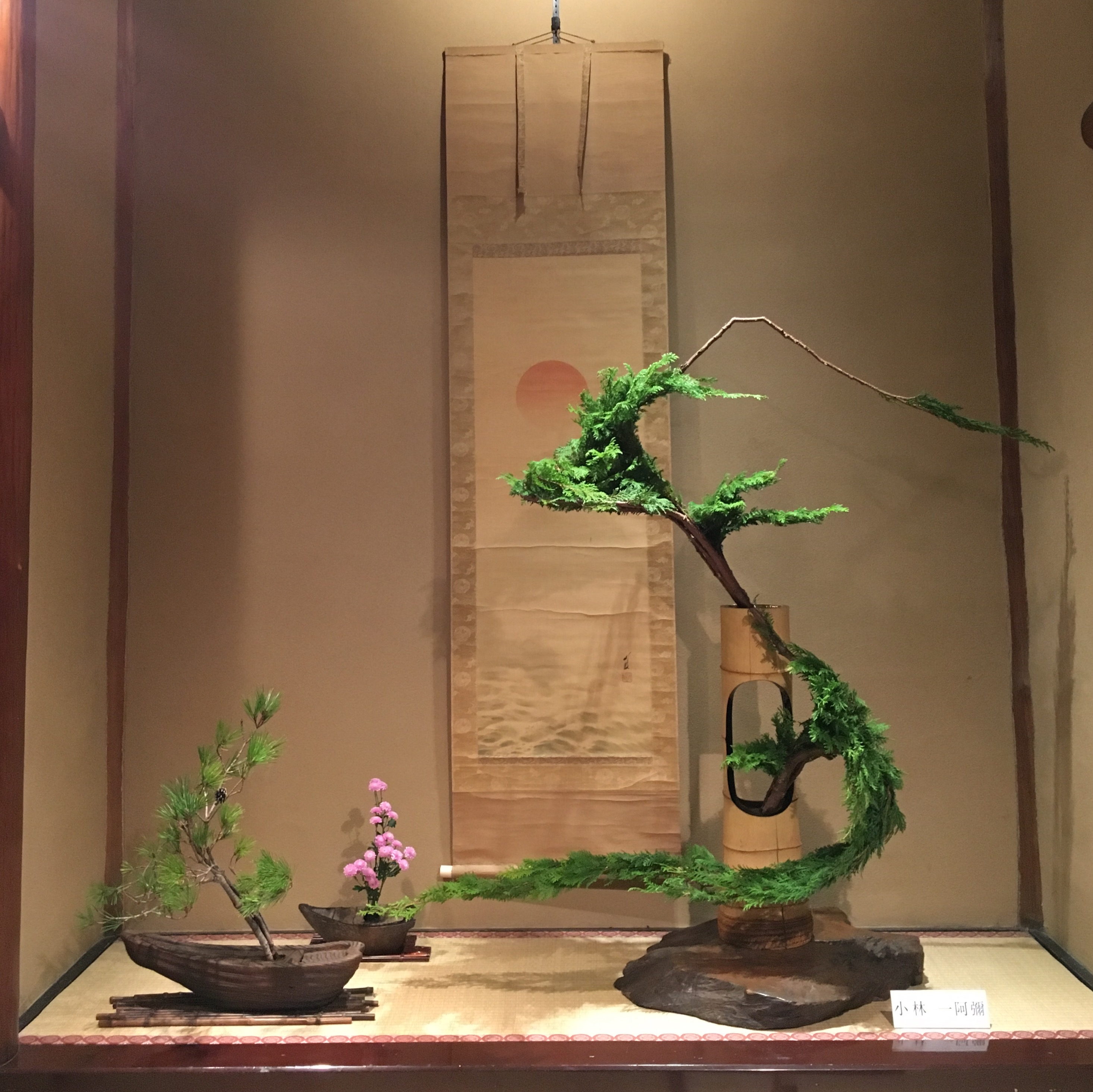
Various Miyako Ko-ryū arrangements shown at the Meguro Gajoen (November 2017)

Miyako Ko-ryū (都古流) is a Japanese school of ikebana that dates back to 1902, when it was formulated by Hajime Isogai. The name of the school was derived from a poem within the Kokin Wakashū.

The name means "old style of the capital," with miyako being an old term for Kyoto, the former capital city of Japan.
