= Takenaga Hayato =

Yagyū Shingan-ryū Heiho (柳生心眼流)
- Ko-ryū

Foundation
- Founder: Takenaga Hayato
- Date founded: c.1600

Current information
- Current headmaster: Hoshi Kunio II 'Ryushinkan'; Shimazu Kenji 'Chikuosha';
- Current headquarters: Iwate Prefecture & Machida

Ancestor schools
- Shindō-ryū • Edo line - Yagyū Shinkage-ryū

Descendant schools
- None identified

Takenaga Hayato 竹永 隼人(birth and death unknown) was the founder of the mainline Yagyū Shingan-ryū(柳生心眼流) a.k.a. Shingan ryu martial arts tradition circa 1600. The YAGYU SHINGAN ryu in its entirety is a school of Heiho (Military Strategy and Tactics) jutsu.

Takenaga left his home in Sendai and travelled to Edo where he became employed by the Yagyu family. Yagyu Munenori (b.1571 - d.1646) later heard of the martial prowess of Takenaga Hayato and allowed Takenaga to engage in training the Edo line Yagyū Shinkage-ryū (柳生新陰流). His progress was remarkable and in due time he was put to the test and as a result Yagyu Munenori passed on the gokui (secret teachings) of the Edo line Yagyu Shinkage ryu to Takenaga Hayato.

Yagyu Munenori knowing Takenaga Hayato was from the Sendai domain possibly took a liking to Takenaga as Yagyu Munenori was on good terms with the daimyō Date Masamune (b.1567 - d.1636) Lord of the Sendai domain c.1600.

The Yagyu Shingan ryu tradition was originally known as Shingan ryu (心眼流)and the name Yagyu (柳生) was included in the tradition on the direction of Yagyu Tajima No Kami Munenori to Takenaga Hayato just before he returned to his home in Sendai.

Before founding the Yagyu Shingan ryu Takenaga Hayato had mastered the Shindō-ryū (神道流), Shinkage-ryu - Divine Shadow (神影流), Shuza-ryū (首座流), Toda-ryū (戸田流) and the Edo line Yagyu Shinkage ryu - Yagyu New Shadow School (柳生新陰流) (Note the different kanji of Shinkage-ryu and Yagyu Shinkage-ryu). It was the Shindo ryu of Ushu Tatewaki which clearly influenced Takenaga.

On his return to Sendai Takenaga's Yagyu Shingan ryu became so popular that many ashigaru sought his teachings and became disciples of the tradition. The ashigaru by profession were normally common farmers engaged in agriculture in the Sendai domain. Today Sendai geographically the inner central region of the Yagyu Shingan ryu is now regarded as a modern city in harmony with nature which lies in the centre of the Tohoku region.

Takenaga Hayato acquired a place where he could live in peace and changed his name to JIKINYU . Until the end of his life he worked instructing the martial spirit in the Sendai domain where he lived in seclusion. An inscribed stone memorial tablet erected in honour of the founder depicts in detail 'Master Student Service'. The memorial is located not far from the estate of Takenaga Hayato which has been recorded by the Momo Cho Education Committee. Takenaga Hayato was a warrior of inspiration and the founder's teachings have been recorded and transmitted from generation to generation and to this day in the Yagyu Shingan ryu Heihojutsu Kyodensho Chikuosha of headmaster Shimazu Kenji and Yagyu Shingan ryu Heiho Ryushinkan of headmaster Hoshi Kunio II.

With unswerving dedication and ability, ongoing research into the Yagyu Shingan ryu continues by Soke Hoshi Kunio II, Headmaster of the Yagyu Shingan Ryu 'Ryushinkan', and Shimazu Kenji, Headmaster of the Yagyu Shingan ryu 'Chikuosha' through the Nihon Bujutsu Shiryokan. Since the 30th January 2024 Tada Teruo sensei is the Headmaster of the Yagyu Shingan ryu 'Chikuosha' following the passing of Shimazu sensei.

Outside of Japan, Phil Hinshelwood and John Hinshelwood of Australia hold teaching licences for Yagyu Shingan ryu Heihojutsu and are authorised by Shimazu Kenji to teach the tradition. YSgR Keikokai in the Hunter Valley under Simon Louis, MgR Keikokai in Sydney under Dr. Andrew Melito, and YSgR Keikokai on the Gold Coast under Chris Davis have been authorized. Per Eriksson of Sweden is also authorised to teach the Yagyu Shingan ryu curriculum. There is a direct link between the Australia and Sweden branches.

== Lineage ==
The following list encapsulates three lines of the Yagyu Shingan ryu Heiho.

'''Ushu Tatewaki Katsuyoshi.' Koshu Kambubu Dohoriken. Arakawa Jirozaemon Masanobu. Toda Seigan Nyudo Ujishige. Yagyu Tajima No Kami Munenori.Takenaga Hayato. Yoshikawa Ichirouemon. Ito Kyuzaburo. Koyama Samon. Aizawa Tadanoshin Token. Chiba Yoshikazu. Satake Shinnosuke. Kato Gonzo. Hoshi Tekichi (Masayoshi). Kano Keikichi. Aizawa Tomio. Shimazu Kenji.

'Ushu Tatewaki Katsuyoshi.' Koshu Kambubu Dohoriken. Arakawa Jirozaemon Masanobu. Toda Seigan Nyudo Ujishige. Yagyu Tajima No Kami Munenori.'' Takenaga Hayato. Yoshikawa Ichirouemon. Ito Kyuzaburo. Koyama Samon. Aizawa Tadanoshin Token. Chiba Yoshikazu. Satake Shinnosuke. Kato Gonzo. Hoshi Tekichi (Masayoshi). Hoshi Seiemon. Hoshi Hikojuro Kuniyuki. Hoshi Kunio. Shimazu Kenji.

'Ushu Tatewaki Katsuyoshi.' Koshu Kambubu Dohoriken. Arakawa Jirozaemon Masanobu. Toda Seigan Nyudo Ujishige. Yagyu Tajima No Kami Munenori.'' Takenaga Hayato. Yoshikawa Ichirouemon. Ito Kyuzaburo. Koyama Samon. Aizawa Tadanoshin Token. Chiba Yoshikazu. Satake Shinnosuke. Kato Gonzo. Hoshi Tekichi (Masayoshi). Hoshi Seiemon. Hoshi Hikojuro Kuniyuki. Hoshi Kunio. Hoshi Kunio II. (YSgR - Yagyu Shingan ryu. MgR - Morishige ryu).
