= Katsura Ko-ryū =

School of ikebana

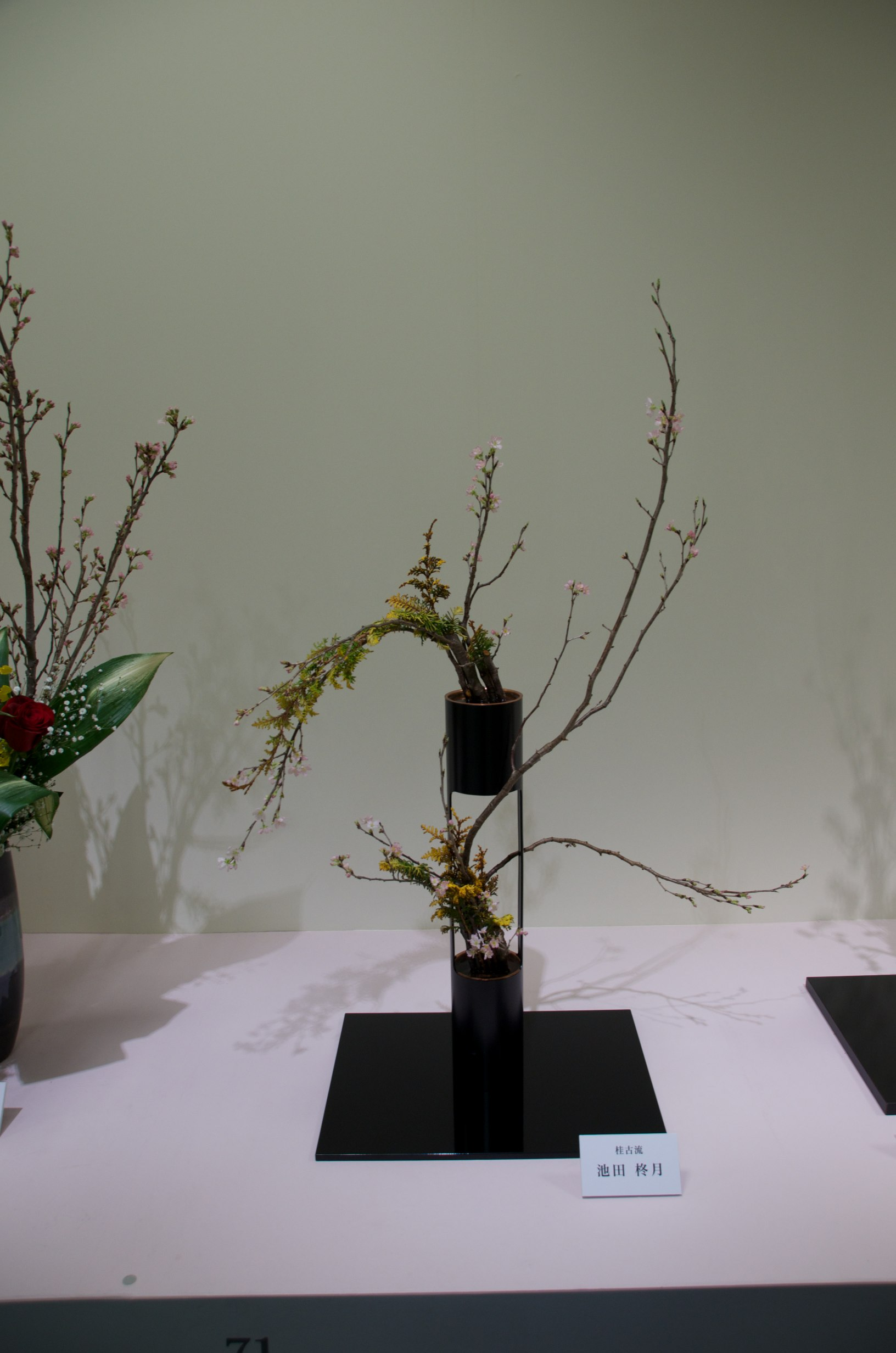
Katsura Ko-ryū arrangement in bamboo vessel

Katsura Ko-ryū (桂古流) is a Japanese school of ikebana.

The name means "old school from Katsura", a location near Kyoto.
