= Tsuji Gettan Sukemochi =

Japanese swordsman (c.1648–1728)

- Born: Tsuji Sukemochi c. 1648; Masugimura, Omi (Shiga prefecture)
- Died: 1728
- Native name: 辻月丹資茂
- Other names: Sukeshige, Heinai, Mugai-shi Ippo Kyoshi
- Style: Kenjutsu
- Teachers: Yamaguchi Bokushinsai, Kenjutsu; Priest Sekitan, Zen zazen
- Rank: Founder, recipient of Menkyo Kaiden in Yamaguchi-ryū

Other information
- Website: Suimokai

Tsuji Gettan Sukemochi (辻月丹資茂) (1648–1728) was a Japanese swordsman who founded the kenjutsu of Mugai-ryū in 1695. Tsuji Gettan was born in Masugimura, Omi (Shiga prefecture) as the second son to a local samurai.
