= Oishi Susumu =

Japanese kenjutsu practitioner (1798–1863)

Oishi Susumu Tanetsugu (大石進種次, 1798–1863) was a Japanese kenjutsu practitioner. He was active during the Tenpō period in the first half of the nineteenth century. A retainer of the Tachibana clan, he was unusually tall for a Japanese person of his day, standing 7 ft (210 cm) tall.

Having trained in the Yagyū Shinkage-ryū, Oishi started his own style of swordsmanship called the Oishi Shinkage Ryu, which attracted many pupils and made Oishi comparatively wealthy. He also made money from dojo arashi (dojo storming), a practice in which a skilled swordsman would challenge masters of other schools. As Oishi was a formidable fighter, many teachers paid him off in order to avoid the embarrassment of a public defeat. Oishi himself eventually suffered a swift and humiliating defeat at the hands of Otani Nobutomo, a swordsman of the Jikishinkage-ryū.

He specialised in powerful thrusting techniques, which were made more effective by the length of his weapon. At the time there was no standardisation of equipment in kendo, and Oishi was noted for using exceptionally long swords or shinai (practice swords), sometimes with blades as long as 5 ft 3 in (1.60 meters). He also made use of customised bōgu (kendo armour), adding complex deflective crests and flaps to confound an opponent's attacks.
