= Aisu Iko =

Japanese martial artist

- Born: 1452
- Died: 1538 (aged 85–86)

Aisu Iko, a.k.a. Aizu Hyūga-no-Kami Iko, Aisu Hisatada (1452 – 1538) was a Japanese martial artist and the founder of the Kage-ryū school of sword fighting.

Aisu was originally a pirate based in Kumano, who raided Japanese and Chinese shipping and whose travels took him on occasion as far as mainland China. After suffering a severe shipwreck off Kyushu, of which he was the only survivor, Aisu abandoned his life as a pirate and entered into seclusion at the Udo caves in Miyazaki Prefecture. Here, he purportedly had a dream in which a monkey deity taught him the secrets of swordsmanship. He named the new style he developed the Kage ("Shadow") School, which based its movements on natural phenomena such as wind and waves. Aisu's student, Kamiizumi Nobutsuna, (who also studied with Iko's son Aisu Koshichiro) would later adapt this style into the Shinkage ("New Shadow") school.

After travelling throughout Japan on a martial pilgrimage for some years, Aisu returned to Kyushu, where he died of natural causes.
