= Shindō-ryū =

- Ko-ryū

Arts taught
- Art: Description

Ancestor schools
- Yagyu Shinkage Ryu

This tradition Shindo Ryu (神道流) was founded by Ushu Tatewaki during the 16th century. Takenaga was also influenced by Yagyu Munenori and studied the Yagyu Shinkage Ryu. Before Takenaga Hayato returned to his home in Sendai he was directed by Yagyu Munenori to include the name Yagyu in his tradition of Shingan Ryu. As a result of his influence Ushu Tatewaki and the Shindō-ryū (神道流) is acknowledged first in the genealogy of the Yagyu Shingan Ryu, followed by the other traditions of which Takenaga Hayato mastered.
