= Hontai Yōshin-ryū =

School of Japanese martial arts

Hontai Yōshin-ryū (本體楊心流)
- Ko-ryū

Foundation
- Founder: Minaki Saburoji
- Date founded: c. 1900
- Period founded: Early Edo period

Current information
- Current headmaster: Inoue Koyichi Munenori

Arts taught
- Art: Description
- Jujutsu: Hybrid art
- Bōjutsu: Staff art
- Hanbōjutsu: Short staff art
- Iaijutsu: Sword drawing art
- Kenjutsu: Sword fighting art

Ancestor schools
- Takenouchi-ryū

Descendant schools
- Moto-ha Yōshin-ryū, Shingetsu Muso Yanagi-ryū, Kukishin-ryū

Hontai Yōshin-ryū (本體楊心流) is a traditional (koryū) school of Japanese martial arts founded from the original teachings of Hontai Yoshin Takagi Ryu, c. 1660, by Takagi Shigetoshi. Some sources give Takagi's middle name as Setsuemon, while others give it as Oriemon.

This school was active during the Edo period, especially dominant in the Himeji-han and Ako-han. The present headmaster (sōke) is Inoue Kyoichi Munenori who succeeded his father Inoue Tsuyoshi Munetoshi. The handover occurred on 16 January 2005.

== Arts practiced ==
The system teaches unarmed grappling arts and various weapon arts including bōjutsu, hanbōjutsu, iaijutsu, and kenjutsu.

== Modern practice ==
Although there are a limited number of official Hontai Yōshin-ryū schools across the world, many westerners have benefited from study at the headquarters in Japan. Therefore, the school's influence on the development of modern jujutsu is significant. The Hontai Yōshin-ryū stays true to its values and traditions and does not advocate commercialization.

== Lineage ==
The order of Hontai Yōshin-ryū succession is as follows

1. Takagi Shigetoshi (born c. 1635, date of death unknown)
2. Takagi Umanosuke Shigesada
3. Takagi Gennoshin Hideshige
4. Okuni Kihei Shigenobu
5. Okuni Hachikuro Nobutoshi
6. Okuni Tarodaibu Tadanobu
7. Okuni Kihyoe Yoshisada
8. Okuni Yozaemon Yoshisada
9. Nakayama Jinnai Sadahide
10. Okuni Buuemon Hidenobu
11. Nakayama Kizaemon Sadataka
12. Okuni Kenji Hideshige
13. Yagi Ikugoro Hisayoshi
14. Ishiya Takeo Masatsugu
15. Ishiya Matsutaro Masaharu
16. Kakuno Happeita Masayoshi (died c. 1939)
17. Minaki Saburo Masanori (born c. 1906, date of death unknown)
18. Inoue Tsuyoshi Munetoshi (born c. 1925)
19. Inoue Kyoichi Munenori (born c. 1949)
