= Shinai =

Bamboo or wooden sword used in kendo

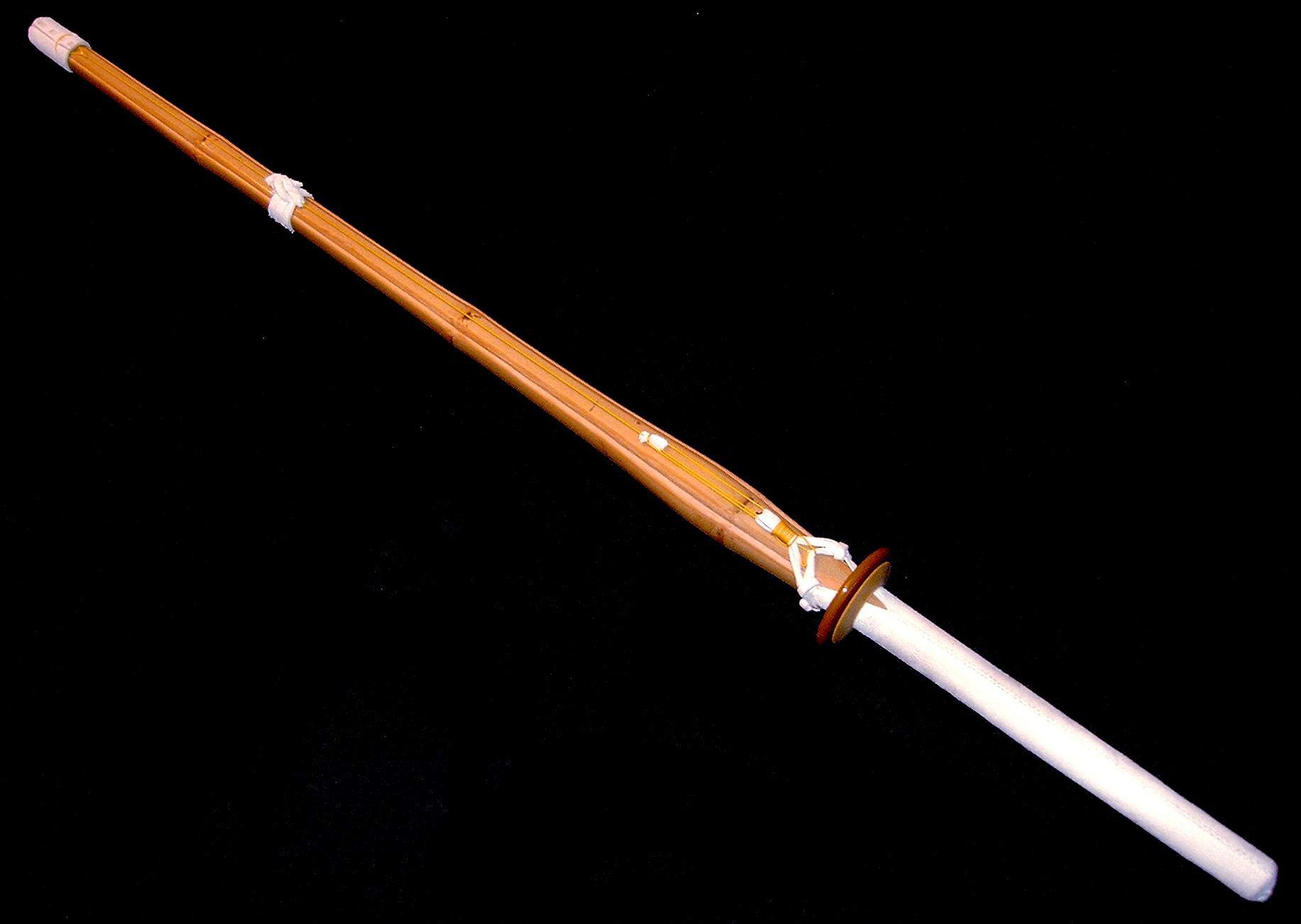
A shinai made of bamboo

A shinai (竹刀) is a Japanese sword typically made of bamboo used for practice and competition in kendō. Shinai are also used in other martial arts, but may be styled differently from kendō shinai, and represented with different characters. The light, soft wood used in a shinai distinguishes it from other wooden swords such as a bokuto (木刀), usually called a bokken (木剣) outside Japan, which is generally made of heavier, sturdier wood.

== History ==
The earliest use of a bamboo weapon to train with instead of a sword is credited to Kamiizumi Nobutsuna (1508–1572?) of the Shinkage-ryū. The modern shinai, with four slats of bamboo, is generally credited to Nakanishi Chuzo Tsugutate (died 1801) of Nakanishi-ha Ittō-ryū. The shinai was developed in an effort to reduce the number of practitioners being seriously injured during practice, making a practice weapon that was less dangerous than bokutō (木刀), the hard wooden swords they were previously using. This is also the motivation behind the development of bōgu (防具), the armour that protects the kendoka.

Due to its lighter weight compared to a bokken or a metal katana, a shinai can be wielded in a fashion that allows quicker strikes than would be practicable with a heavier sword. This also makes shinai popular in producing movies and television shows; a prop shinai with a thin metal covering can look similar to a metal sword, while allowing cinematic, showy strikes that are nevertheless fairly safe to perform.

== Etymology ==
The word "shinai" is derived from the verb shinau (撓う), meaning "to bend, to flex", and was originally short for shinai-take (flexible bamboo). Shinai is written with the kanji 竹刀, meaning "bamboo sword", and is an irregular kanji reading.

In kendo, it is most common to use a single shinai, sometimes called ittō (一刀) style. Some kendōka choose to use two shinai. This kendō style is usually called ni-tō (二刀), a style that has its roots in the two-sword schools of swordsmanship such as Hyōhō Niten Ichi-ryū. A ni-tō combatant uses a long shinai called the daitō (大刀), which is usually held in the right hand, and a shorter shinai, called the shōtō (小刀), which is usually held in the left hand. The holding position can be switched, however, with the daitō in the left hand and the shōtō in the right. The daitō is shorter and lighter than a shinai used in the ittō style of kendō. Specifications for shinai used in kendō competitions that follow the International Kendo Federation (FIK) rules are below.

== Construction ==
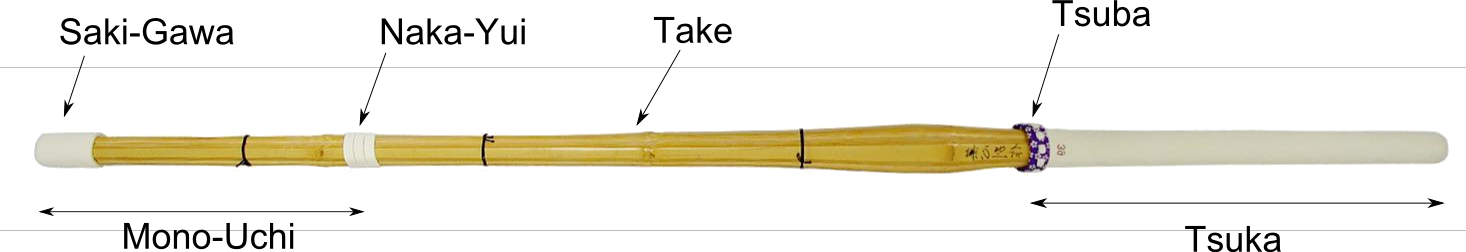
The shinai components

Sizes and style of shinai vary. For example, an adult may be able to use a shinai that is too heavy for a younger person, so shinai with different sizes and characteristics are made. Shinai are available in many styles and balances. A shinai should not be confused with a bokutō, which has a much more similar shape and length to a Japanese sword and is made from a single piece of wood. However, both shinai and bokken are used in kendo.

The slats of a shinai are usually made from dried bamboo. Some may also be treated by smoking them, or soaking them in resin. Shinai slats are also made of carbon fibre, reinforced resin, or other approved alternative materials.

The shinai comprises four slats known as take (竹), which are held together by three leather fittings: a hilt (tsuka), or handle wrapping (tsuka-gawa (柄皮)); a fitting at the tip (saki-gawa (先皮)) and a leather strip (naka-yui (中結)) that binds the four slats. The parts are all secured with a string (tsuru (弦)).

The nakayui is tied about one-third of the length of the exposed bamboo from the tip . This holds the slats together and also marks the proper kendo striking portion of the shinai, or datotsu-bu (打突部).

Inserted between the ends of the slats, under the saki-gawa, is a plastic plug saki-gomu (先ゴム), and under the tsuka-gawa there is a small square of metal chigiri (ちぎり), that holds the slats in place.

A hand-guard tsuba (鍔) is then fitted on the tsuka-gawa before it ends and the bamboo slats show. This is held in place by a rubber ring tsuba-dome (鍔止め).

== Safety ==
The shinai is useful as a practice sword to simulate the weight and feel of a katana or bokken without injuring the user or the target. Upon impact the bundled slats dissipate the force of the strike by flexing/bending along the length of the blade, and expanding slightly, along its cross-sectional area (stress = force/unit area). As a result of this lack of rigidity, along with the relative innocuous nature of bamboo vs razor-sharp steel, the impacted area is less damaged and may experience only bruising, rather than life-threatening deep cuts or puncture wounds, even with strong and forceful strikes.

== Proper care ==
A shinai must be properly taken care of or it can pose a danger to both the user and the people around it. Shinai should be inspected for splinters and breaks before and after use, and maintained in a manner considered most appropriate by one's style, dōjō, or sensei.

Many people assert that oiling and sanding a shinai prior to its first use, and then periodically during use, can greatly extend its life. However, some disagreement exists on what is considered proper shinai care.

To properly inspect a shinai, one first examines the area around the datotsu-bu, inspecting all sides of the shinai for splinters. This is very important, as bamboo splinters can easily cause injury. The saki-gawa should be intact and the tsuru should be tight so that the saki-gawa does not slip off the end of the shinai during use. In addition, the nakayui should be tight enough as not to rotate easily.

When not in use, shinai used in kendo practice should be either laid on the floor or leaned vertically against a wall. Some instructors require the base (kashira) of the handle (tsuka) on the floor and the tip (kissaki) leaning against the wall. In kendo, the shinai is treated in the same way as a edged or bladed weapon, like an actual metal sword, and competitors are trained to think of it as a dangerous instrument if misused.

When a shinai is placed on the floor, it is considered poor etiquette to step over it.

== Regulations ==
In kendo competitions that follow the FIK rules, there are regulated weights and lengths for the use of shinai.

Table A. FIK Specifications for competition use of one Shinai (Itto).
Specification	Gender	Junior High School (12–15 yrs)	Senior High School (15–18 yrs)	University students and Adults (18 yrs+)
Maximum length	Male & Female	114 cm (45 in)	117 cm (46 in)	120 cm (47 in)
Minimum weight	Male	440 g (16 oz)	480 g (17 oz)	510 g (18 oz)
Minimum weight	Female	400 g (14 oz)	420 g (15 oz)	440 g (16 oz)
Minimum diameter of sakigawa	Male	25 mm (0.98 in)	26 mm (1.0 in)	26 mm (1.0 in)
Minimum diameter of sakigawa	Female	24 mm (0.94 in)	25 mm (0.98 in)	25 mm (0.98 in)
Minimum length of sakigawa	Male & Female	50 mm (2.0 in)	50 mm (2.0 in)	50 mm (2.0 in)

Shinai are weighed complete with leather fittings, but without tsuba or tsuba-dome. The full length is measured. Maximum diameter of the tsuba is 9cm.

Table B. FIK Specifications for competition use of two Shinai (Nito).
Specification	Gender	Daito (long shinai)	Shoto (short shinai)
Maximum length	Male & female	114 cm (45 in)	62 cm (24 in)
Weight	Male	440 g (16 oz) minimum	280–300 g (9.9–10.6 oz) maximum
Weight	Female	400 g (14 oz) minimum	250–280 g (8.8–9.9 oz) maximum
Minimum diameter of sakigawa	Male	25 mm (0.98 in)	24 mm (0.94 in)
Minimum diameter of sakigawa	Female	24 mm (0.94 in)	24 mm (0.94 in)

Shinai are weighed complete with leather fittings, but without tsuba or tsuba-dome. The full length is measured. Maximum diameter of the tsuba is 9cm.

Commercial Shinai Sizing
Size	Length		Size	Length	
28	36 in	92 cm	36	44 in	112 cm
30	38 in	97 cm	37	45 in	114 cm
32	40 in	102 cm	38	46 in	117 cm
34	42 in	107 cm	39	47 in	120 cm

== Fukuro-shinai ==
The ancestor of the modern kendo shinai is the fukuro-shinai (袋竹刀), which is still in use in koryū kenjutsu. This is a length of bamboo, split multiple times on one end, and covered by a leather sleeve. This explains the name fukuro, which means bag, sack or pouch. Sometimes the older and rarer kanji tō (韜) is used, but has the same meaning as fukuro.

Some schools cover the entire bamboo in the sleeve and add a tsuba, like Kashima Shinden Jikishinkage-ryū does. In Shinkage-ryū, the sleeve is lacquered Kamakura Red, and rather than covering the entire length, is tied off at the non-split end. This particular kind of fukuro-shinai is also called a hikihada (蟇肌), or toad-skin shinai. The name comes from how the leather looks after lacquering; the sleeves are actually made of cow or horse-hide.

== Other uses ==
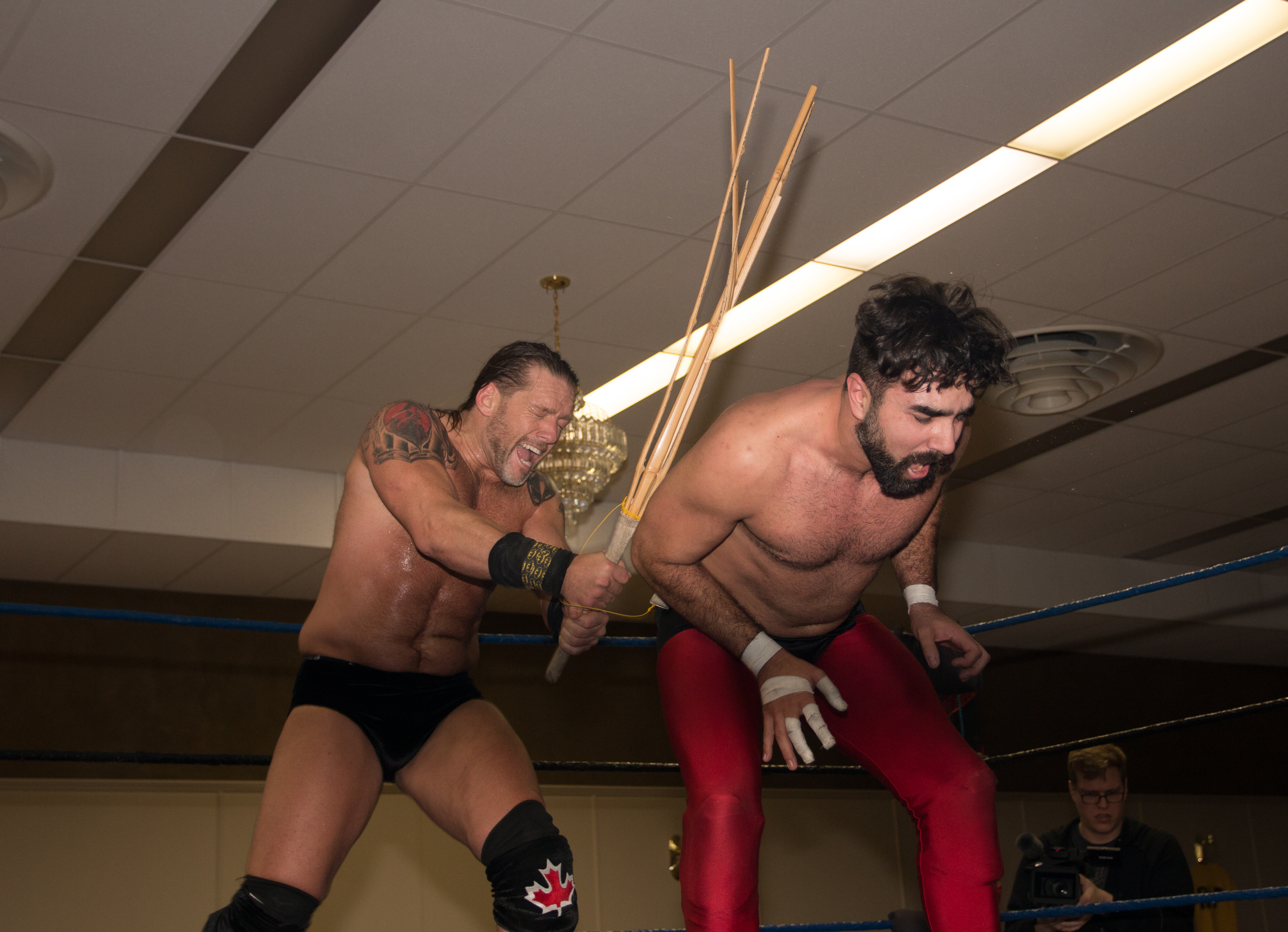
Johnny Devine (left) uses a kendo stick on Buck Gunderson during a match.

Shinai are commonly used as a weapon in professional wrestling (in particular, Hardcore wrestling), where they are often referred to as kendo sticks or Singapore canes. Wrestlers are typically struck across the back, stomach, legs and arms, though some are struck in the head or face, sometimes depending upon the wrestling promotion where the match is taking place.

== See also ==
- Waster
