= Fumon Tanaka =

Japanese martial artist

Fumon Tanaka (田中 普門, Tanaka Fumon; December 13, 1943 – January 10, 2025) is a traditional Japanese martial arts practitioner who holds a number of Soke positions in Japanese schools of martial arts. Specialising in various weapon forms (Bojutsu, Sojutsu, Iaijutsu, Naginata) and unarmed fighting methods. He is also an author and has appeared in numerous world media.

== Early years ==
His grandfather, who was in charge of the emperor's protection, instilled in him a drive to learn kobudo from an early age. He began his formal martial arts training at the age of 13 with Kendo attaining a 4th Dan at 25 years old.

== International teaching ==
In 1988 he traveled to France as part of the Nihon Budo delegation selected by the Japanese Ministry of Education and the Agency of Cultural Affairs. Since then he has frequently been invited to teach in Germany, Italy, England, France, Denmark, Kuwait and Sweden.

== Enshin Ryu ==
In 1963, Fumon Tanaka was accepted as a disciple by Nichikan Kobayashi, 10th Soke of the old school of Enshin Ryu sword. The Odachi sword employed in this school is more than 2 meters long, a compromise between the large sword, the lance and the halberd. In 1975, Tanaka was selected to succeed his master as the head of the school and became the 11th Soke after having received, in 1973, the certificate of complete mastery (menkyo kaiden); He thus received in 1975 Gokui kaiden, (transmission of all the major techniques) of the school Enshin Ryu, concerning:

- Koden iai (the art of quick drawing the greatsword, called Sengoku Ōdachi in this school)
- Kenjutsu and Jūjutsu
- Kumiuchi Hyogo (fusion of kenjutsu and jujutsu)
- bojutsu (staffs)
- sojutsu (spears)
- naginata (glaives)
- Honmon Suemonogiri Kenpo - techniques of cutting objects with the sword.

== Kukishin Ryu ==
In 1973 Tanaka Sensei is accepted as a secret disciple of the Head-Master Minaki Saburoji Masanori 17th Master of the Kukishin-ryū and Hontai Yoshin Ryu Jujutsu (Bō and Hanbō). In 1985, he received the license of Menkyo Kaiden. The 18th Soké of the Kukishin Ryu school, Kyodo Matsuda was Sōke for only one day. He then named Sōke Tanaka as 19th Soké of the Kukishin Ryu.

== Soke ==
Fumon Tanaka is currently Sōke of the following ryū:

- 19th Sōke - Kukishin Ryu Bojutsu
- 11th Sōke - Koden Enshin Ryu Kumiuchi Kenden
- 4th Sōke - The restored school Honmon Enshin Ryu Suemonogiri Kenpo
- 19th Sōke - Tenshin Hyoho Soden Kukamishin Ryu

== Soke-Dairi ==
- Hontai Takagi Yoshin Ryu
- Bokuden Ryu
- Shinto Tenshin Ryu (Tenshin Koryu)
- Shinden Fudo Ryu
- Asayama Ichiden Ryu
- Shindo Tenshin Ryu

== Other ranks ==
- Modern Kendō - 4th dan
- Modern Bōjutsu - 5th dan
- Kumiuchi Hyōhō Soden Yawara-no-jutsu - 7th dan
- Kyoshi battōjutsu - 7th dan
- Hanshi kobudō - 8th dan
- Koga Ryu ninjutsu
- Iga Ryu ninpo

== Other accomplishments ==
- 1974 - Soke attained 7th Dan in Swordsmanship at 31 years old, for Yawara Ju Jutsu and Iai Jutsu by Japanese Zen Kobudo Sogo Renmei.
- 1989 - he received the title of Hanshi 8th Dan at the age of 46 years; he is the youngest person so highly graded in an Official Japanese Federation. He is 9th Dan of the World Jujutsu Federation.

== Publications ==
Fumon Tanaka, Samurai Fighting Arts: The Spirit and the Practice, (2003) Kodansha International, ISBN 978-4-7700-2898-3

Fumon Tanaka, Sword Techniques of Musashi and the Other Samurai Masters, (2013) Kodansha International, ISBN 978-1-5683-6475-9

== Media ==
Fumon Tanaka has appeared in the BBC series Mind, Body & Kick Ass Moves and is shown in episode 7.
