= Meguro Gajoen =

Building in Shimomeguro, Tokyo, Japan

Coordinates: 35°37′52″N 139°42′52″E

Gajoen Tokyo, LXR Hotels & Resorts Hotel Gajoen Tokyo
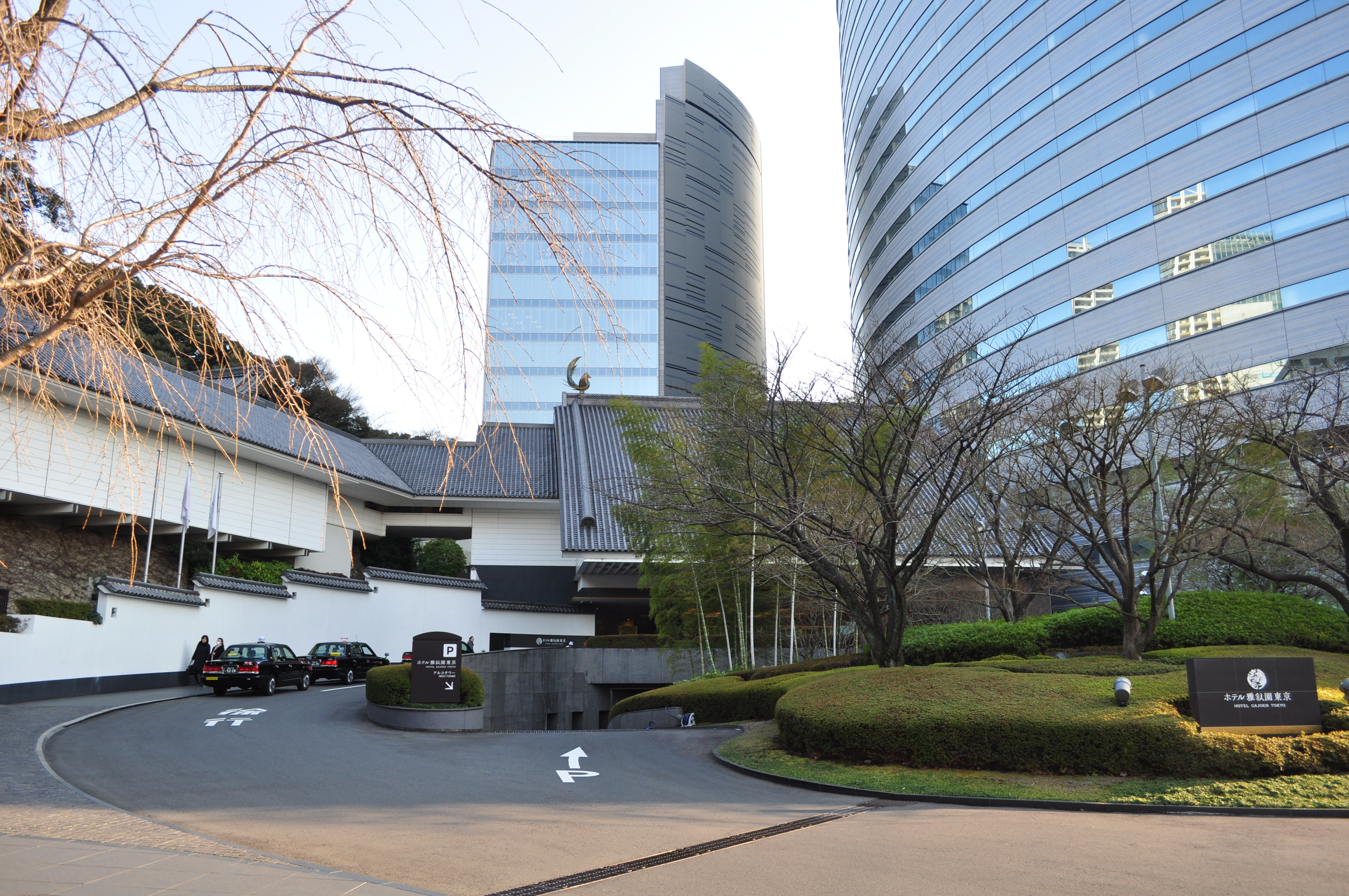

General information
- Location: 1-8-1 Shimomeguro, Meguro, Tokyo, Japan
- Opened: 1 November 1931; 94 years ago

Design and construction
- Developer: Rikizo Hosokawa

Website
- www.hilton.com/en/hotels/tyoolol-gajoen-tokyo/

The Gajoen Tokyo, LXR Hotels & Resorts, better known by its former name Meguro Gajoen (目黒雅叙園), is a historic hotel, wedding and restaurant building located on the eastern edge of Shimomeguro.

== History ==
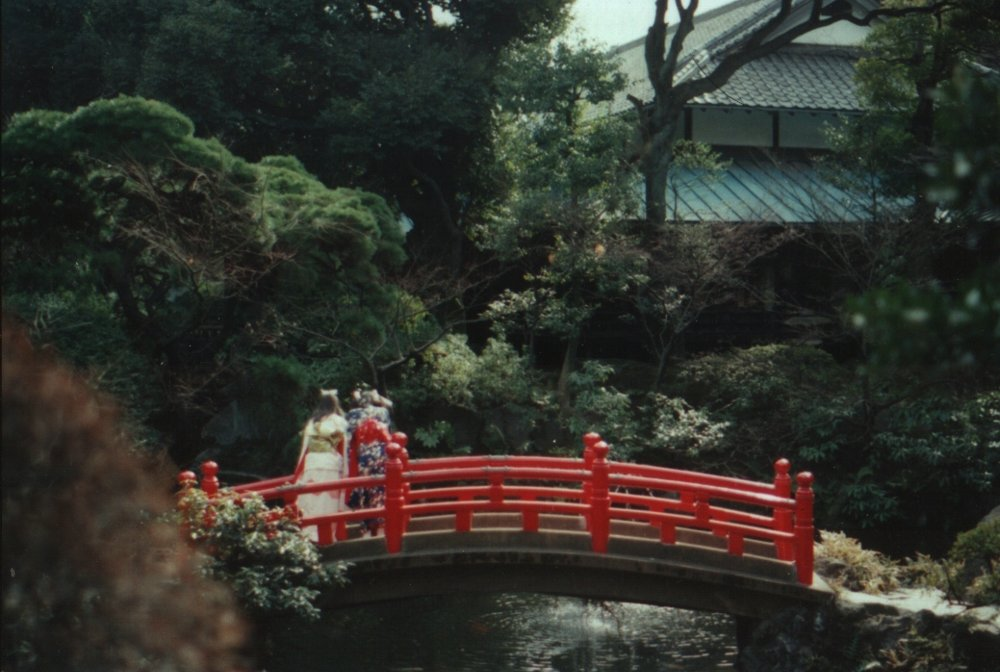
Original building, shortly before demolition

The Meguro Gajoen was established by Rikizo Hosokawa in 1931. Previously, he had operated a ryōtei in Shibaura, and upon acquiring the Meiji-era house of shipping tycoon Shoichi Iwanaga in Shimomeguro, he decided to relocate his business there. The house was renamed Meguro Gajoen and became known for its Japanese and Beijing cuisine.

The original building, featured in Osamu Dazai's novel Kajitsu (佳日), was demolished except for the Hyakudan Kaidan (One Hundred Steps), which has been incorporated into the new building complex. The current complex is largely the result of an 85 billion yen (approximately 700 million dollars at the time) renovation completed in 1991. Designed by Nikken Sekkei and Kajima, much of the ornamentation and artwork, or in some cases whole rooms from the old building were preserved and integrated into the new structure.

In May 2026, the hotel, owned by Brookfield Corporation, signed a management contract with Hilton to join their LXR Hotels & Resorts luxury brand in 2027 as Gajoen Tokyo, LXR Hotels & Resorts, following renovations.

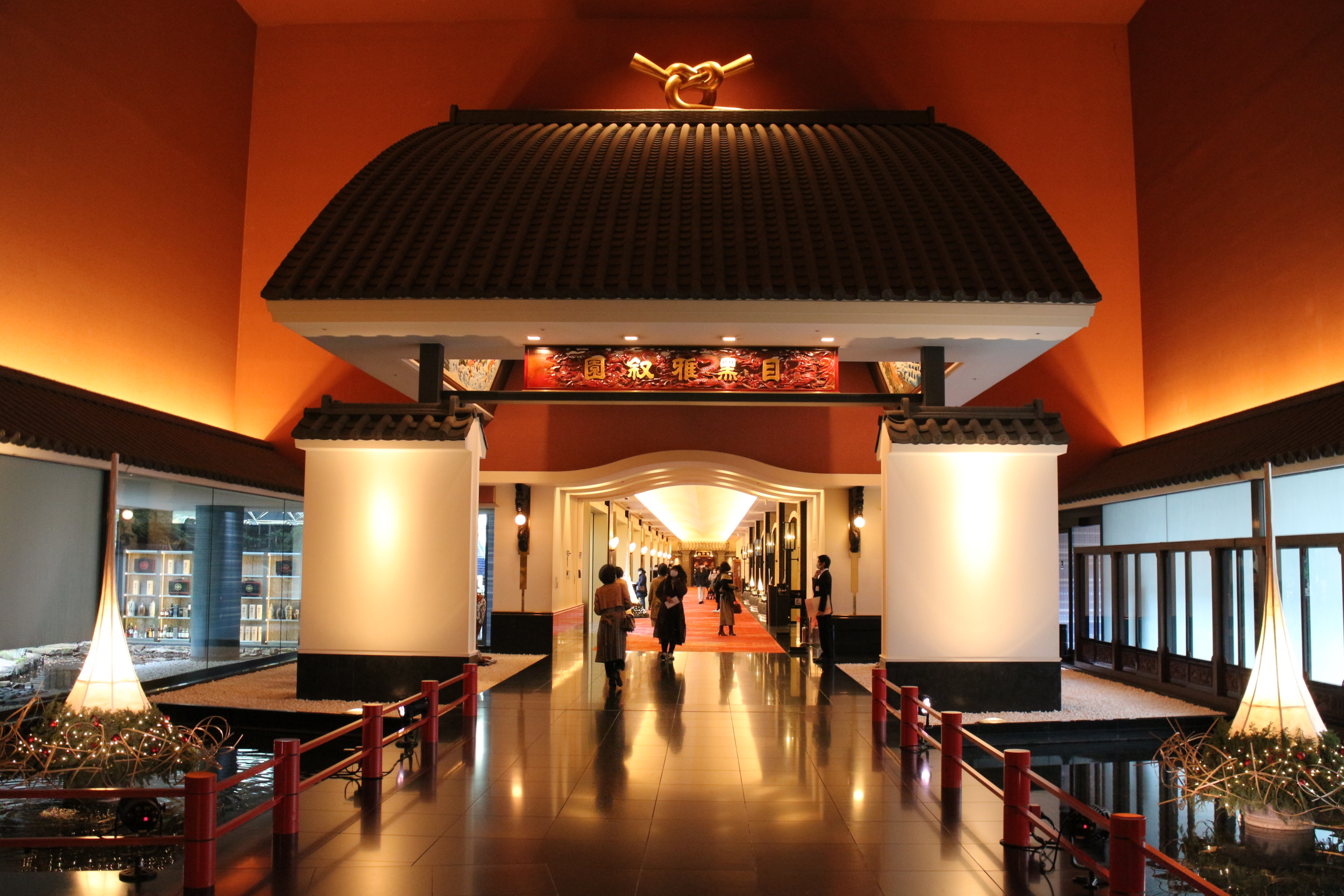
Entrance

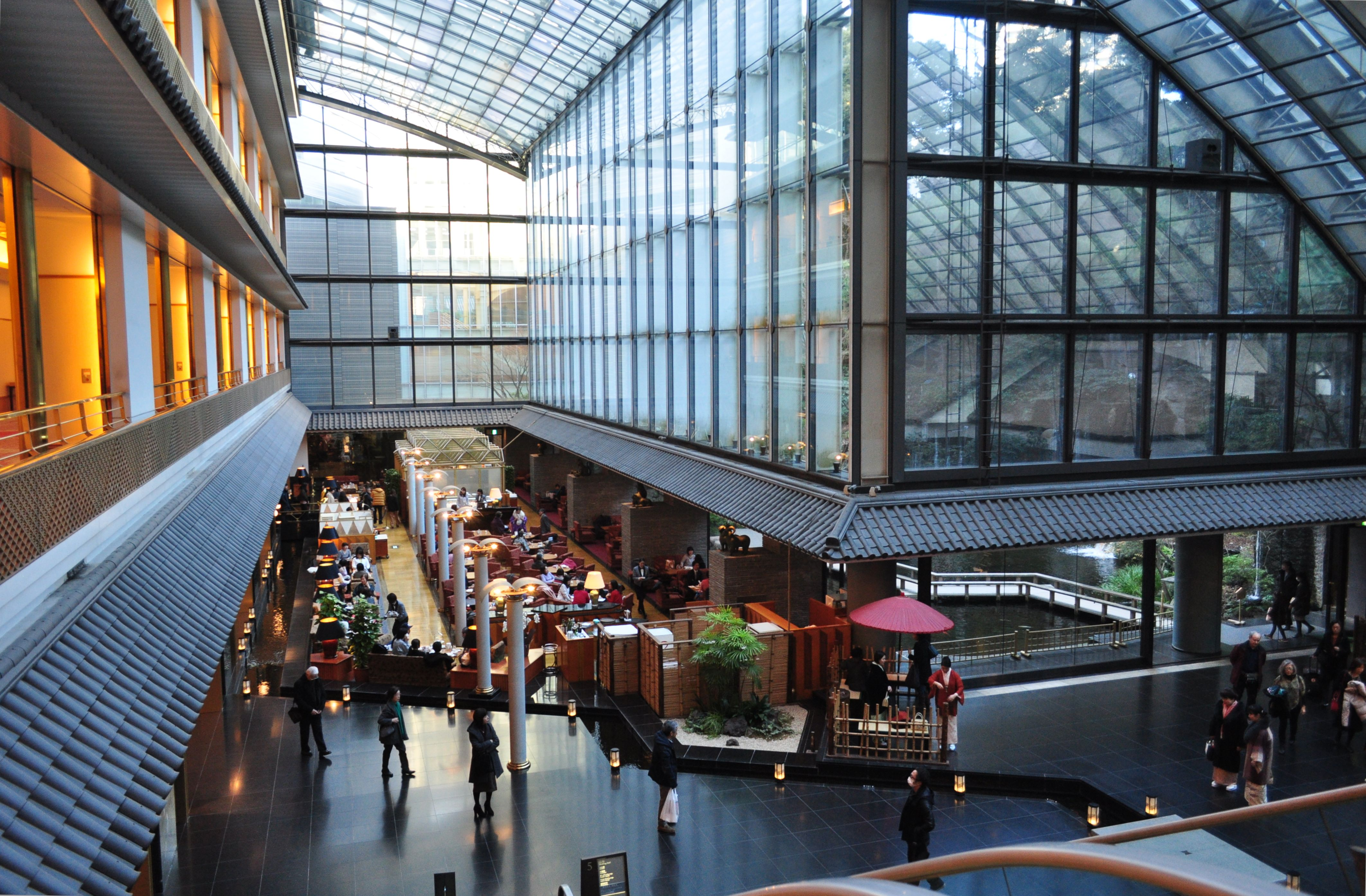
Atrium

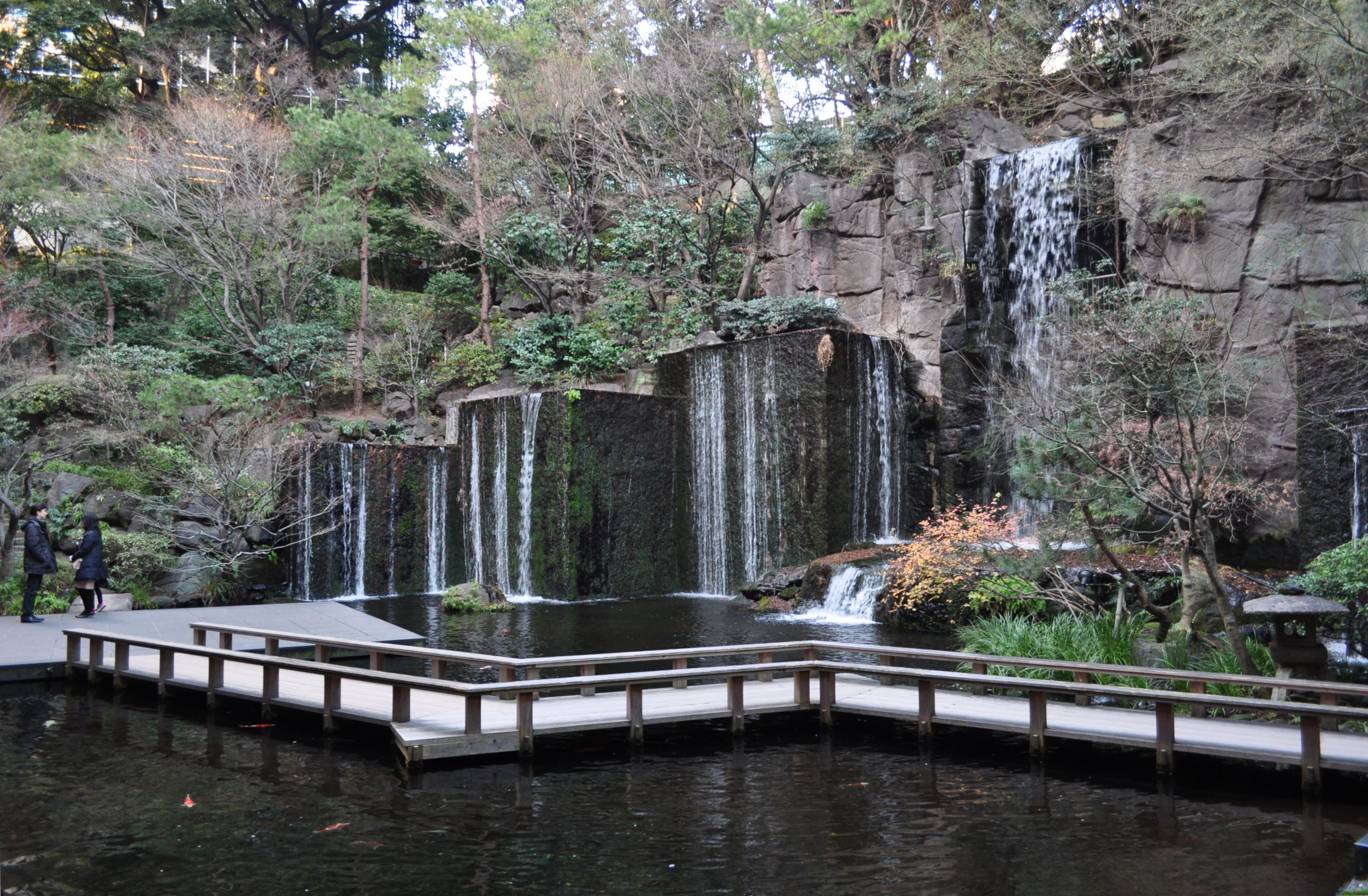
Garden

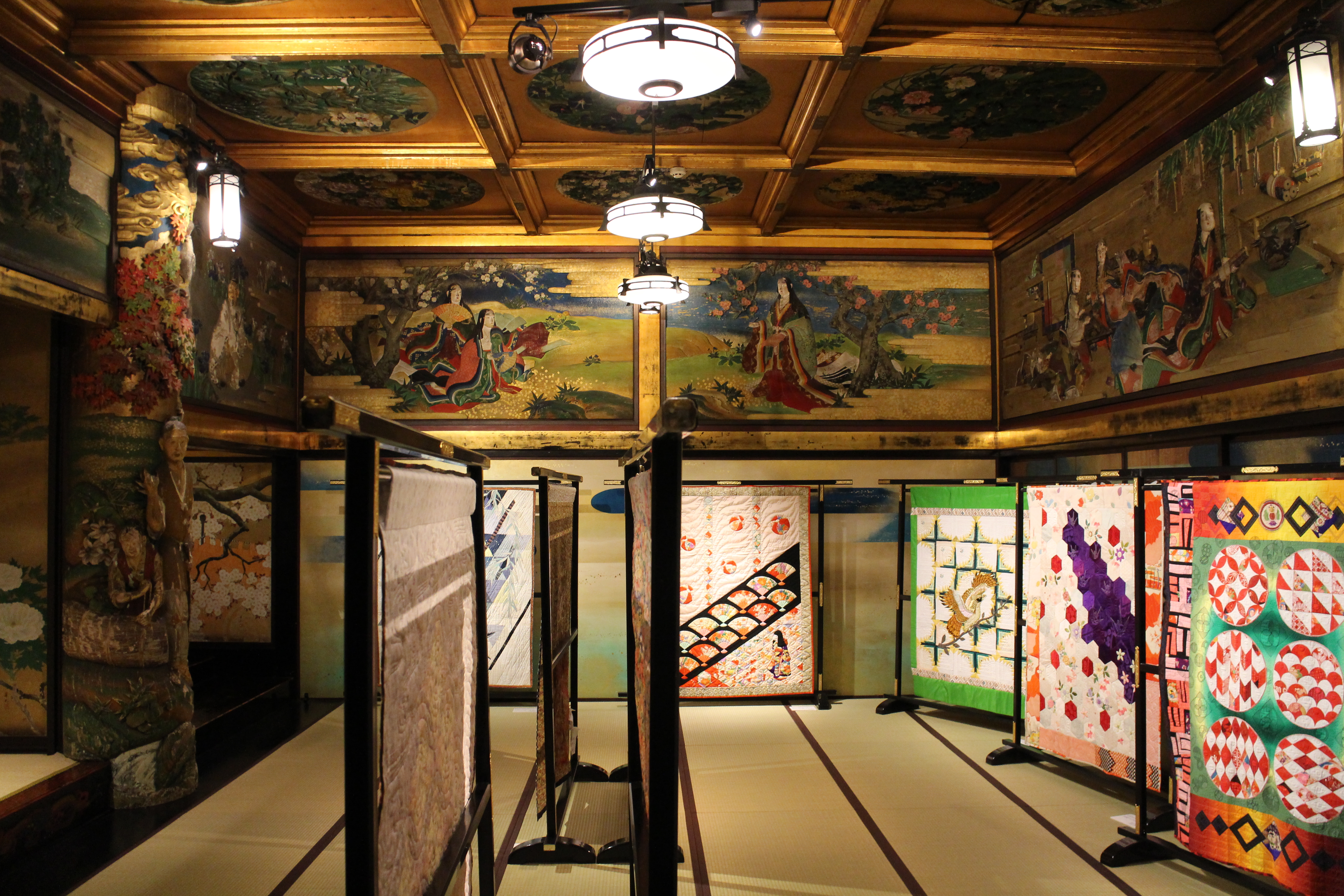
One of the Japanese-style rooms
