= Shinkage-ryū =

Traditional school of Japanese martial arts

Ko-budō Japanese martial art
Shinkage-ryū (新陰流)
Founder(s)
Kamiizumi Ise-no-Kami Hidetsuna (上泉 伊勢守 信綱)	1508–1578
Founding Date
Late Muromachi period	c.1560s
Arts taught
Japanese name	Description
Kenjutsu	Sword art

Shinkage-ryū (新陰流) meaning "new shadow school", is a traditional school (koryu) of Japanese martial arts, founded by Kamiizumi Ise-no-Kami Fujiwara-no-Hidetsuna, later Kamiizumi Ise-no-Kami Nobutsuna (上泉 伊勢守 信綱, 1508–1578) in the mid-sixteenth century. Shinkage-ryū is primarily a school of swordsmanship (kenjutsu and iaijutsu) and is a synthesis of Nobutsuna's studies in the school of Kage-ryū (Aizu). Shinkage-ryu can also refer to Kashima-derived schools such as Kashima Shinden Jikishinkage Ryu and Kashima Shin Ryu.

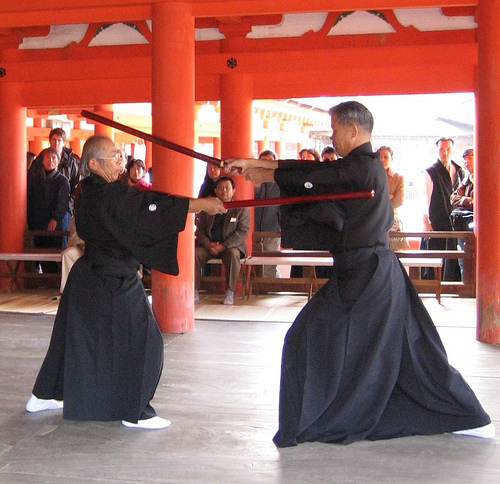

== History ==
Until the 16th century in Japan, martial techniques were concerned with effectiveness in real battle. At the time of the founder of Shinkage-ryū, Kamiizumi Hidetsuna, the superiority of a school was determined through duels. Basic postures were very distinct; very low, in the protection of the body. The idea of winning at any price was deeply ingrained in the teachings of the schools that existed at this time. Primary philosophical and strategic concepts included the "sword that kills only once" (一殺の太刀, issatsu no tachi) and the "sword of only one cut" (一の太刀, ichi no tachi).

However, with the arrival of firearms and other elements of modern warfare, these traditional techniques were no longer sufficient. As a result of the use of this new technology, Kamiizumi was spurred to make a number of changes. He changed the basic postures a bit by raising them slightly, he changed the manner of holding the sword, and he shortened the length of the blade of the sword. Perhaps most importantly, he also invented a new method of teaching to make the study and practice of the sword easier. Until Kamiizumi, swordsmen practiced their art with either a very hard wooden sword (bokken) or one with a dulled steel blade. Because of this, swordsmen had to stop their blows during training if they did not want to hurt themselves or their students or partners. Kamiizumi created a practice sword made of a length of bamboo, split two to 16 times on one end, and covered in a lacquered leather sleeve. He called this invention a hikihada shinai.

Kamiizumi, sensing the changes in the ways of war at the time, re-thought his methods of martial arts and began to advocate the utilization of light armour during training. The face of war was being transformed, and as it was necessary to move faster than before, Nobutsuna perfected a style of sword "freer" in its movements, more sparse, more restrained, more adapted to brawls and to duels than the fields of large-scale battles.

== Yagyū Shinkage-ryū ==
Kamiizumi did not have children and left all his property and his school to his student Yagyū Sekishūsai Muneyoshi (柳生 石舟斎 宗厳 1529–1606). Muneyoshi thus became the second headmaster of Shinkage-ryū in 1566, and subsequently founded his own school, the Yagyū Shinkage-ryū. He was renowned as a remarkable swordsman and was the fencing instructor of the 15th and last Ashikaga shōgun, Ashikaga Yoshiaki (足利 義昭, 1537–1597). After Muneyoshi gave a demonstration to the 2nd Tokugawa shōgun, Tokugawa Hidetada (徳川 秀忠, 1579–1632), of the empty-handed "sword-catching" (mutō-dori) techniques he had developed, the Yagyū family became the official fencing instructors to the Tokugawa shogunate.

== See also ==
- Oishi Shinkage-ryū Kenjutsu
