= Yagyū Shinkage-ryū =

Japanese swordsmanship school

Yagyū Shinkage-ryū (柳生新陰流)
- Ko-ryū

Foundation
- Founder: Kamiizumi Nobutsuna (上泉 信綱)
- Date founded: c.1568
- Period founded: Late Muromachi period (1336–1573)

Current information
- Current headmaster: Yagyū Kōichi Toshinobu (Became the 22nd sōke in 2006)

Arts taught
- Art: Description
- Kenjutsu - ōdachi, kodachi, nitō: Sword art; with long sword, short sword, and two swords.
- Jōjutsu: "Short staff" art
- Shurikenjutsu: Spike throwing art

Ancestor schools
- Kage-ryū (Aizu) • Nen-ryū • Tenshin Shōden Katori Shintō-ryū

Descendant schools
- Shindō-ryū, Yagyū Shingan-ryū, Ryōi Shintō-ryū

Yagyū Shinkage-ryū (柳生新陰流) is one of the oldest Japanese schools of swordsmanship (kenjutsu). Its primary founder was Kamiizumi Nobutsuna, who called the school Shinkage-ryū. In 1565, Nobutsuna bequeathed the school to his greatest student, Yagyū Munetoshi, who added his own name to the school. Today, the Yagyū Shinkage-ryū remains one of the most renowned schools of Japanese swordsmanship. Its name roughly means Yagyū New Shadow School.

== Feudal Japan and birth of the Shinkage school ==
At the time of the school's founding by Kamiizumi Nobutsuna, the superiority of a school was determined through duels. Basic postures were distinct; a very low stance was maintained, in the interest of protecting the body. The idea of winning at any price was deeply ingrained in the schools of the time, as were the concepts of Isatsu-no-tachi (the school of the sword that kills only once) or Ichi-no-tachi (the sword of only one cut). A great deal of importance was placed on the technology of swords and armor themselves. However, with the arrival of muskets (arquebuses) and other elements of modern warfare, these traditional techniques were no longer sufficient.

Nobutsuna, with the creation of the Shinkage-ryū (New Shadow School), changed basic postures by raising them slightly. He also changed the manner of holding the sword. The swords themselves were changed; in an era in which a sword could be two meters, Nobutsuna shortened the length of the blade. Most importantly, he perfected a new method of teaching to make the study and practice of the Way of the Sword easier. Before Nobutsuna, practice was carried out with either a very hard wooden sword (a bokken) or one with a dulled steel blade. The practitioners had to therefore stop their blows during teaching to avoid hurting themselves or their students. It is claimed that Kamiizumi created the practice sword called the fukuro shinai (frog bamboo sword), which is made of strips of bamboo similar to a kendo shinai but covered inside a leather pouch. The shinai allowed striking with quickness, fluidity and potency without causing serious or disabling wounds as one would with the wooden sword, and without having to stop the attacks.

Nobutsuna, sensing the changes in the ways of war at the time, re-thought his methods of martial arts (bujutsu), and began to advocate the utilization of light armour during training. The face of war was being transformed, and as it was necessary to move faster than before. Nobutsuna perfected a style of sword fighting that was freer in its movements, more sparse, more restrained, more adapted to brawls and to duels, than to the fields of large scale battles.

Nobutsuna created the ancient schools of sword known as satsujin-ken, or the killing swords. These are characterized by postures and offensive techniques, designed to win at any price. He wanted to establish tatsujin-ken—the sword of an accomplished man, an Expert. The art of the sword of the Shinkage school takes into account and adapts to the opponent's weaponry, contrary to the former sword styles which taught to impose dominance without taking into account the opponent.

The strategy of the Shinkage school takes into account the geography of the terrain, the hour of battle, and other parameters. For instance, to utilize the technique named empi, one must understand a deeper, secret level (gokui) of battle. In empi, (meaning, the "Swallow takes Flight") one uses a technique of spearing an opponent with a thrown sword. To do this, one learns to use the sword not only to defend his position but to also have the "power of adaptability" in facing different individuals, much as a captain must consider the winds and change sails in order to travel in the best direction to reach his objective. It is similar to a hunting hawk, which must constantly reconsider the best trajectory in which to strike effectively. Like the raptor, it is necessary to be able to anticipate, to be able to assess and definitively act. "Move with the mind, in order to move with the body" is one of the central tenets of the school. Another sword style is called Katsujin-ken (the One who preserves Life, the Sword of the Victor). Katsujin-ken teaches that, if one's sword does not stop the movement of the enemy, then one may try to fit to the opponent's rhythm, thus entering into the mind of the adversary to find his weakness.

== Kamiizumi Nobutsuna's legacy ==
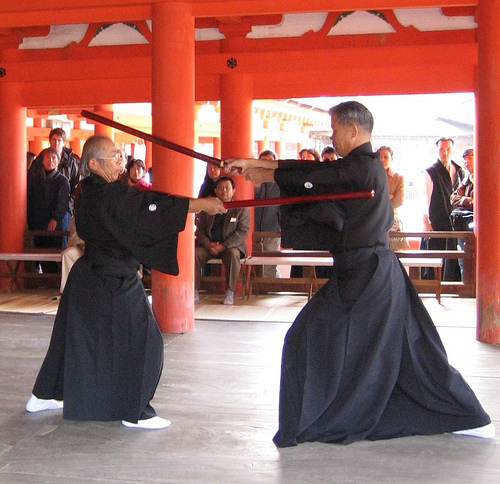

The feudal lord Kamiizumi Nobutsuna led a simple life. Although he was not a monk, he kept his head shaved, which was a sign of renunciation of the everyday world. He did not have children and left all his property to his student Yagyū Munetoshi. Munetoshi had gained his own renown as a remarkable swordsman even before Nobutsuna's passing. He began development of the mutō techniques of using bare hands against the sword and it is he who appended the name of his family (Yagyū) onto the name of the school, founding the Yagyū Shinkage-ryū. His son, Yagyū Munenori, later perfected the techniques of mutō, and also created the techniques of iaijutsu.

Upon Munetoshi's death in 1606, the school split into two. His grandson Yagyū Toshiyoshi took command of the Owari branch, while Munenori became the head of the Edo branch. Takenaga Hayato, the founder of the Yagyū Shingan Ryū Heiho was a student and received the gokui of the Yagyū Shinkage-ryū under Yagyū Munenori. The Edo branch, although no longer headed by a descendant of the Yagyū family, continues to be practiced by a small, faithful group of practitioners in Osaka under the direction of Sono Seigo. The Owari branch of Nagoya continues under the guidance of a direct descendant of Munetoshi, Yagyū Kōichi Toshinobu.

Munenori's son, Yagyū Jūbei Mitsuyoshi, contributed greatly, in turn, to the school. He was not only a master of sword, but also a strategist, an expert of jujutsu-yawara, ninjutsu, kempō and an ascetic who went on musha shugyō, the warrior's ascetic journey. His sword technique was named chie-no-ken (sword of Transcendent Wisdom).

The one who codified the techniques of the Yagyū Shinkage-ryū into its traditional form was the fifth soke (heir), Yagyū Toshikane. He codified all the basic instruction (kihon-waza) into a document known as Hassei-hō or more commonly Sei-hō. These series were responsible for making understood the essential points of forms (kata) that had been transmitted by Munenori. Before the advent of modern kendō, he created a form of free fighting in teaching with shinai.

Latter, the 5th Sōke, Yagyū Renya and his father, the 3rd headmaster Hyōgonosuke, invented the concept of Tsuttattaru-mi (art of war without armor) to adapt their style to the current era where samurai would fight in civilian clothes, unlike orthodox Katori Shintō-ryū whose students always fight with samurai armor protection and weak points in mind, even when they don't wear one for training.

Then came the Meiji era, where all martial arts schools had trouble to continue to exist. Many faded away, especially little schools started by rōnin trying to make a living, and Ishi-Sōden family arts. But Meiji-Tennō directly ordered to Yagyū Toshichika-sōke to permanently preserve the Yagyū Shinkage-ryū, and so he did. The 20th headmaster, Toshinaga, even moved to Tokyo and became the instructor to the Imperial Guards and taught in Butokukai seminars in order to spread further Shinkage-ryū.

The Owari dōjō in Nagoya that had existed since Edo period burned down during World War Two, but the school managed to survive.

== Connection with Morihei Ueshiba ==
Nakai Masakatsu (中井 正勝, fl. 1891–1908), a teacher whose own teachers had been proficient in Shinkage-ryū and Yagyū Shingan Ryū Taijutsu. As far as is known, Nakai taught Morihei Ueshiba (the founder of aikido) some of the taijutsu of Yagyu Shingan-ryū from 1903 to 1908, in his dojo in Sakai near Osaka. At the time, Ueshiba was serving in the 61st Regiment in the Japanese Army. In 1908 Masakatsu gave Ueshiba a mid level license in Gotōha Yagyū Shingan Ryū Taijutsu. In the 1920's, Ueshiba learned a small portion of Yagyu Shinkage-ryū from shihan, Gejo Kisaburo.

== Yagyū Shinkage-ryū in the United States ==
Yagyū Shinkage-ryū was also taught in the United States from 1981-1988 by Yagyu Hideki. The authority to teach the art was given to Hideki's student-turned-adopted-son who runs a school near Kobe, Japan, and to his two top American students—one of whom (as of 2005) resides in China where he teaches the art, and the other in the United States who, as of 2012, is in training to return to teaching. Only Hideki's son and two top American students were issued permission to teach the art to anyone else.

The Edo branch has a United States representative under Sono Seigo with permission to teach the art. Paul Manogue runs a group out of Philadelphia in Old City Aikido.

== Lineage ==
Mainline

- Founder - Kamiizumi Ise-no-kami Fujiwara Nobutsuna
- 2nd Headmaster- Yagyū Tajima-no-kami Taira Munetoshi (Yagyu Sekishusai)
- 3rd - Yagyū Hyōgonosuke Taira Toshitoshi (Jounsai)
- 4th - Owari Gondainagon Minamoto Yoshinao (Tokugawa Yoshinao)
- 5th - Yagyū Hyōgo Taira Toshikane (Yagyū Renyasai)
- 6th - Owari Gondainagon Minamoto Mitsutomo
- 7th - Owari Gonchūnagon Minamoto Tsunanobu
- 8th - Yagyū Hyōgo Taira Toshinobu
- 9th - Owari Gonchūnagon Minamoto Yoshimichi
- 10th - Yagyū Rokurōbe Taira Toshitomo
- 11th - Yagyū Hyōsuke Taira Toshiharu
- 12th - Owari Saishochūjō Minamoto Haruyuki
- 13th - Yagyū Mataemon Taira Toshiyuki
- 14th - Yagyū Hyōsuke Taira Toshihisa
- 15th - Owari Gondainagon Minamoto Naritomo
- 16th - Yagyū Shinroku Taira Toshimasa
- 17th - Yagyū Chūjirō Taira Toshishige
- 18th - Owari Gondainagon Minamoto Yoshikumi
- 19th - Yagyū Sangorō Taira Toshichika
- 20th - Yagyū Kinji Taira Toshinaga
- 21st - Yagyū Nobuharu Taira Toshimichi
- 22nd - Yagyū Kōichi Taira Toshinobu (Yagyū Genshin)

Edo line

- 1st - Yagyū Tajima-no-kami Taira Munenori
- 2nd - Yagyū Jūbei Taira Mitsuyoshi
- 3rd - Yagyū Hida-no-kami Taira Munefuyu
- 4th - Yagyū Tsushima-no-kami Taira Muneari
- 5th - Yagyū Bizen-no-kami Taira Toshikata
- 6th - Yagyū Tajima-no-kami Taira Toshihira
- 7th - Yagyū Tajima-no-kami Taira Toshimine
- 8th - Yagyū Noto-no-kami Taira Toshinori
- 9th - Yagyū Hida-no-kami Taira Toshitoyo
- 10th - Yagyū Tajima-no-kami Taira Toshiakira
- 11th - Yagyū Hida-no-kami Taira Toshiyoshi
- 12th - Yagyū Tsushima-no-kami Taira Toshimune
- 13th - Yagyū Tajima-no-kami Taira Toshimasu
- 14th - Yagyū Toshihisa
- 15th - Yamane Muneichiro & Saito Jizaburo
- 16th - Otani Genshu
- 17th - Sono Seigo
- 18th - Paul Manogue

Other Branches
Kogenshakai

- Edward Klogen (student of Yagyū Nobuharu)
- David Alonso (student of Yagyū Nobuharu)
- Matsumoto Takakazu
- Matsumoto Kenichiro
- Hironaga Kazunori

Shūnpūkan

- Kanbe Kinshichi (student of Yagyū Toshichika)
- Katō Isao
- Yukihiro Shimomura

Arakidō

- Ōtsubo Shihō (student of Yagyū Toshichika and Toshinaga)
- Mutō Masao
- Kajitsuka Yasushi

Marobashikai

- Watanabe Tadatoshi (student of Yagyū Toshichika and Toshinaga)
- Watanabe Tadashige
