= Ko-ryū =

Japanese term for any kind of Japanese school of traditional arts

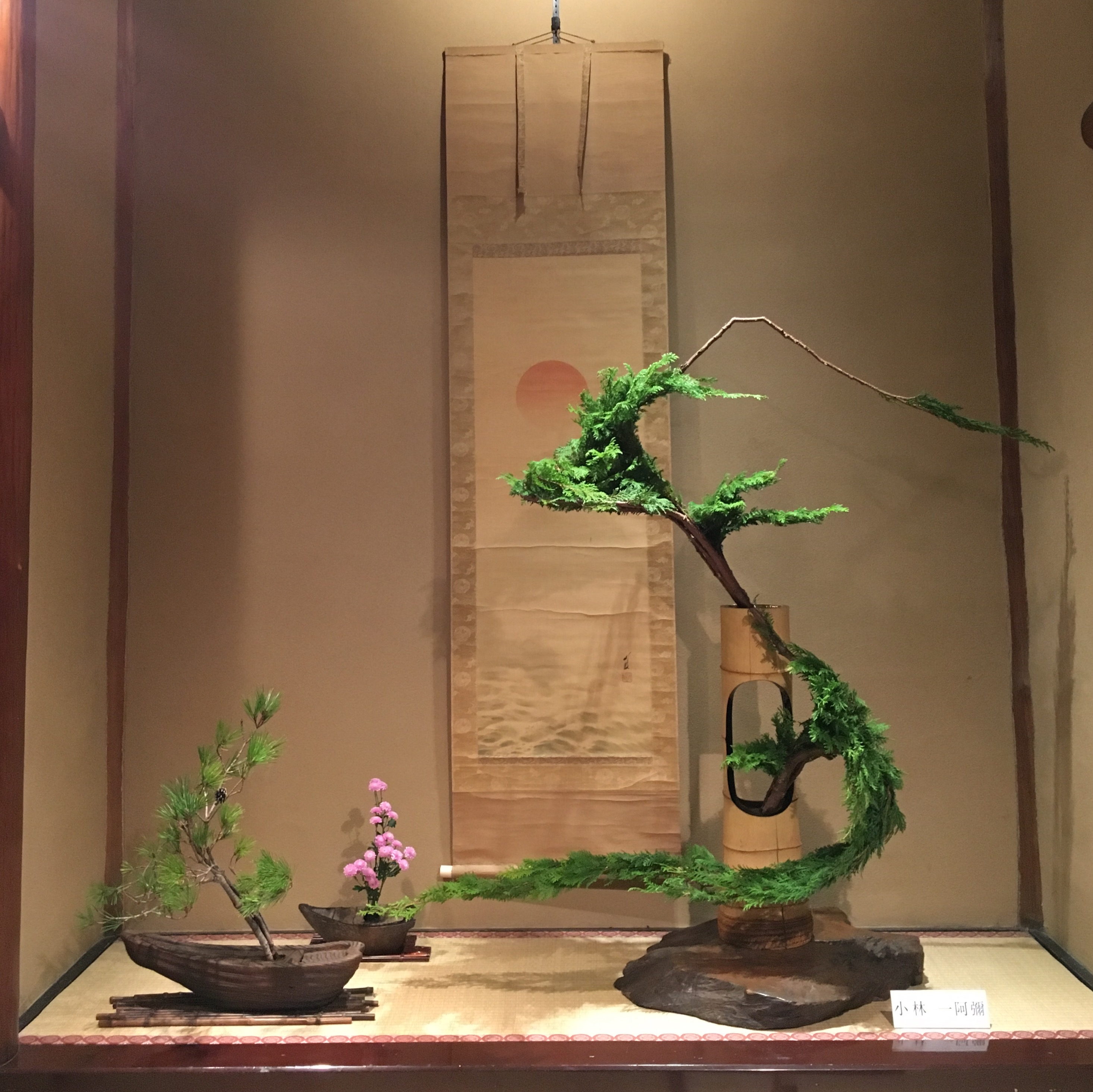
Various Miyako Ko-ryū ikebana arrangements shown at the Meguro Gajoen (November 2017)

Ko-ryū (Japanese: 古流; 'old school') is a Japanese term for any kind of Japanese school of traditional arts. The term literally translates as "old school" (ko—'old', ryū—'school') or "traditional school". It is sometimes also translated as "old style".

== Martial arts ==
Ko-ryū is often used as a synonymous shorthand for ko-budō (古武道), ancient Japanese martial arts that predate the Meiji Restoration of 1868. In English, the International Hoplology Society draws a distinction between Koryū and Kobudō martial arts based on their origin and the differences between their ranking of priorities concerning combat, morals, discipline, and/or aesthetic form.

== Ikebana (flower-arranging) ==
Ko-ryū is one of the oldest and most traditional schools of Ikebana. From it, various other schools have formed that carry its name, such as the Nihon Ko-ryū, Katsura Ko-ryū, Miyako Ko-ryū, Ko-ryū Shōshōkai, Ko-ryū Toyokai, Ko-ryū Shōōkai (古流松應会).

== Sources ==
- Draeger, Donn F. Classical Bujitsu (Martial Arts and Ways of Japan). Weatherhill, 1973, 2007. ISBN 978-0834802339
- Hall, David A. Encyclopedia of Japanese Martial Arts. Kodansha USA, 2012. ISBN 978-1568364100
- Skoss, Diane, Editor. Koryu Bujutsu: Classical Warrior Traditions of Japan. Koryubooks, 1997. ISBN 978-1890536046
- Skoss, Diane, Editor. Sword and Spirit: Classical Warrior Traditions of Japan, Volume 2. Koryubooks, 1999. ISBN 978-1890536053
- Skoss, Diane, Editor. Keiko Shokon: Classical Warrior Traditions of Japan, Volume 3. Koryubooks, 2002. ISBN 978-1890536060
