= Hōfu Tenmangū =

Shinto shrine in Yamaguchi Prefecture, Japan

Hōfu Tenman-gū 防府天満宮
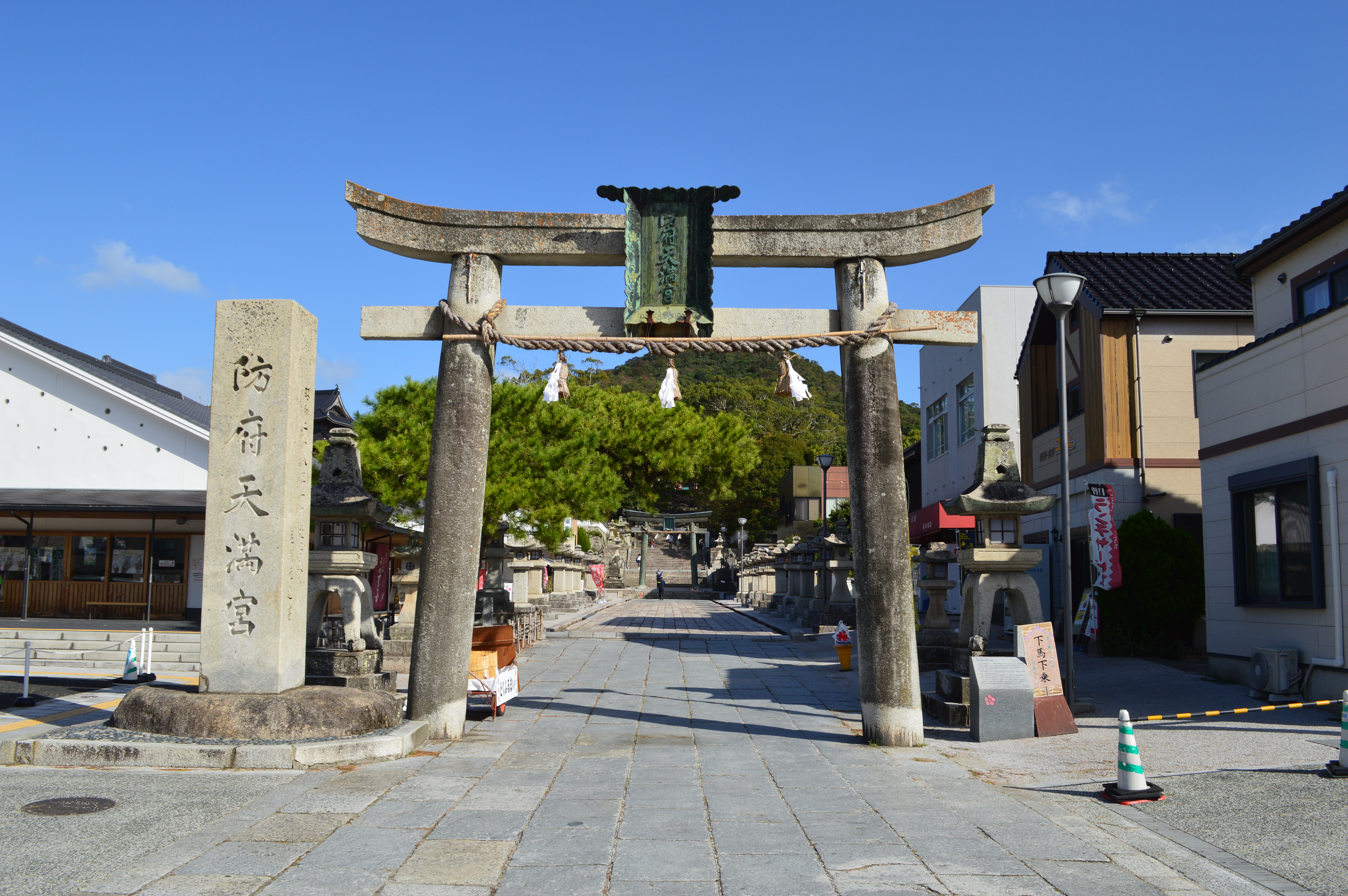

- Location within Japan

Religion
- Affiliation: Shinto
- Deity: Tenjin
- Type: Tenman-gū

Location
- Location: 14-1, Matsuzaki-cho, Hōfu; Yamaguchi 747-0029
- Coordinates: 34°3′47.8″N 131°34′26.6″E

Architecture
- Established: 904

Website
- www.hofutenmangu.or.jp

Hōfu Tenman-gū (防府天満宮) is a Shinto shrine in Hōfu, Yamaguchi Prefecture, Japan. It is one of the main shrines dedicated to Tenjin, the deified form of Sugawara no Michizane.

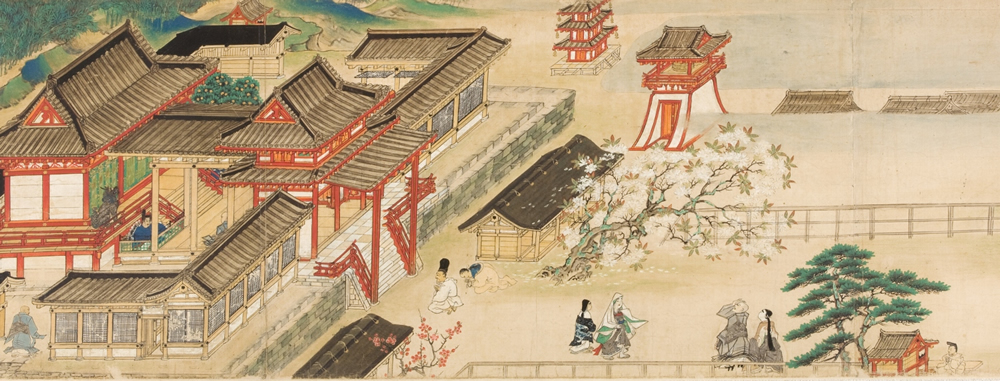
Detail of a scroll painting showing Matsuzaki Shrine in Hōfu Tenmangū

== See also ==
- Modern system of ranked Shinto shrines
- Kitano Tenman-gū
- Three Great Tenjin Shrines
- Tenjin Matsuri
