= Yabo Tenmangū =

Shinto shrine in Tokyo, Japan

Yabo Tenmangū 谷保天満宮
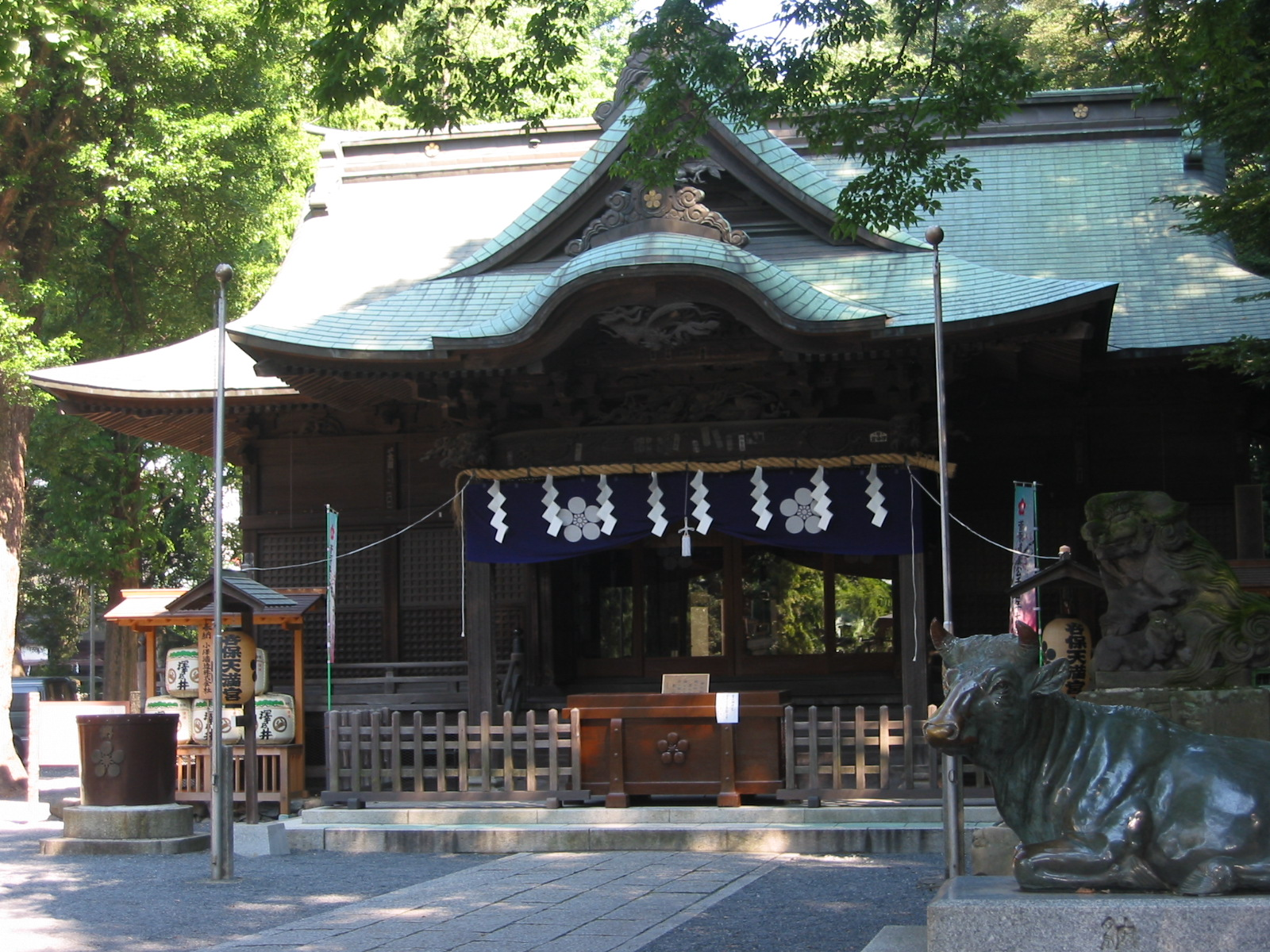
- Honden of Yabo Tenmangū

- Location within Japan

Religion
- Affiliation: Shinto
- Deity: Sugawara no Michizane
- Type: Shimmei Shrine

Location
- Location: 5209 Yaho, Kunitachi-shi, Tokyo
- Interactive map of Yabo Tenmangū 谷保天満宮
- Coordinates: 35°40′48.6″N 139°26′37.2″E

Architecture
- Established: 903

Website
- www.yabotenmangu.or.jp

Yabo Tenman-gū (谷保天満宮) is a Shinto shrine in Kunitachi, Tokyo, Japan.

== History ==
Located next to the Kōshū Kaidō highway, Yabo Tenman-gū claims to be the oldest Shinto shrine in the Kantō region dedicated to Tenjin, the deified Sugawara no Michizane, having been built in 903 AD by Michizane's third son.

== See also ==
- Yushima Tenman-gū
- Tenjin Matsuri
