= Dazaifu Tenmangū =

Shinto shrine in Fukuoka Prefecture, Japan

Dazaifu Tenman-gū 太宰府天満宮
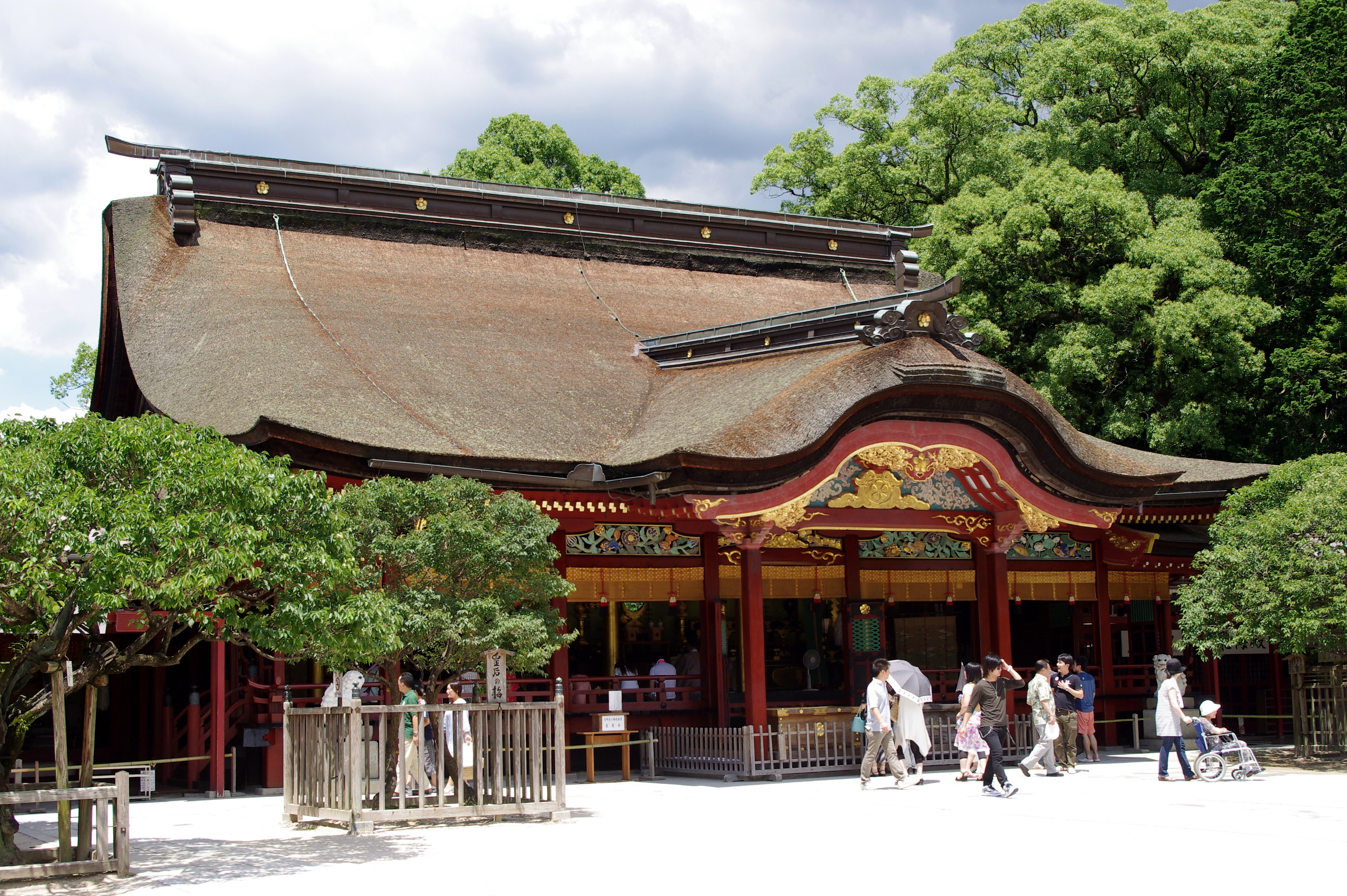
- The honden, or main shrine

- Location within Japan

Religion
- Affiliation: Shinto
- Deity: Tenjin
- Type: Tenman-gū

Location
- Location: 4-7-1, Saifu, Dazaifu; Fukuoka 818-0195
- Interactive map of Dazaifu Tenman-gū 太宰府天満宮
- Coordinates: 33°31′17″N 130°32′06″E

Architecture
- Established: 905

Website
- www.dazaifutenmangu.or.jp/other/index.htm

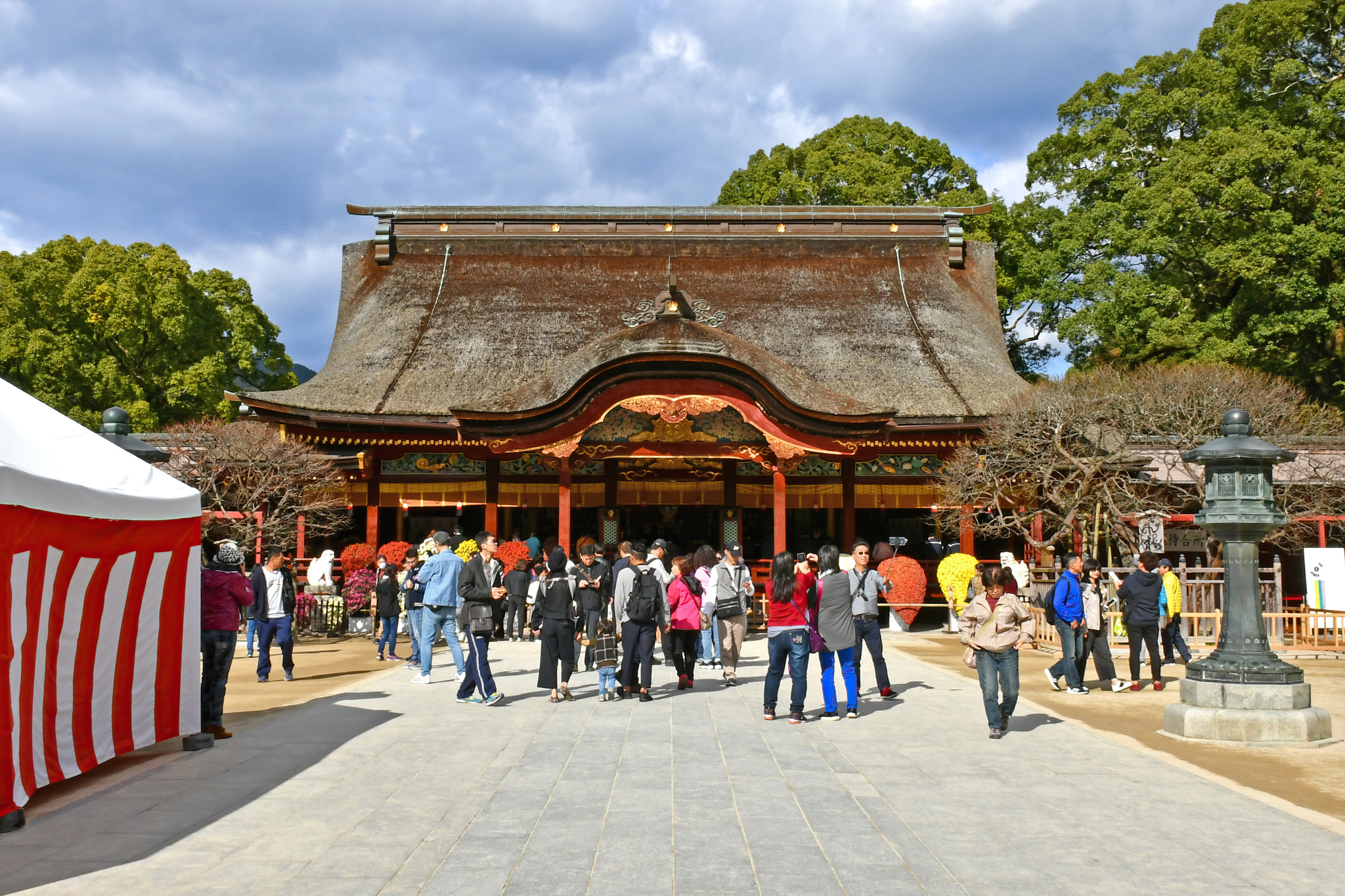
Front view of the honden

Dazaifu Tenman-gū (太宰府天満宮) is a Shinto shrine in Dazaifu, Fukuoka Prefecture, Japan. It is built over the grave of Sugawara no Michizane (845–903) and is one of the main shrines dedicated to Tenjin, the deified form of Michizane.

== Shrine legend ==
According to legend, Michizane was a gifted student who composed many poems dedicated to his favorite plum trees. Said to be favored by the gods, Michizane raised the ire of the Fujiwara clan, who exiled him to Kyushu. Michizane spent his exile studying, and died at the age of 57.

When Michizane died, his body was carried by an ox that stopped near a Buddhist monastery. Unable to move the body along, Michizane was buried there by his follower, Umasake no Yasuyuki, and the shrine was built there. Today, a statue of an ox stands nearby to commemorate the event. It's also said that the plum tree inside the shrine flew from Kyoto to be reunited with Michizane in his death, and that it is always the first plum tree to bloom in Japan.

Soon after Michizane died, five members of the Fujiwara clan, the royal family involved in Michizane's exile, died, one from a lightning strike that struck the clan's castle. Michizane, deified as Tenjin, was thus seen as a vengeful spirit. When disasters struck Kyoto, the Fujiwara clan aimed to appease Michizane's spirit and, as penance, reinstated his position and rank posthumously. Through this appeasement, Tenjin's reputation became associated with literature and education.

== Shrine grounds ==
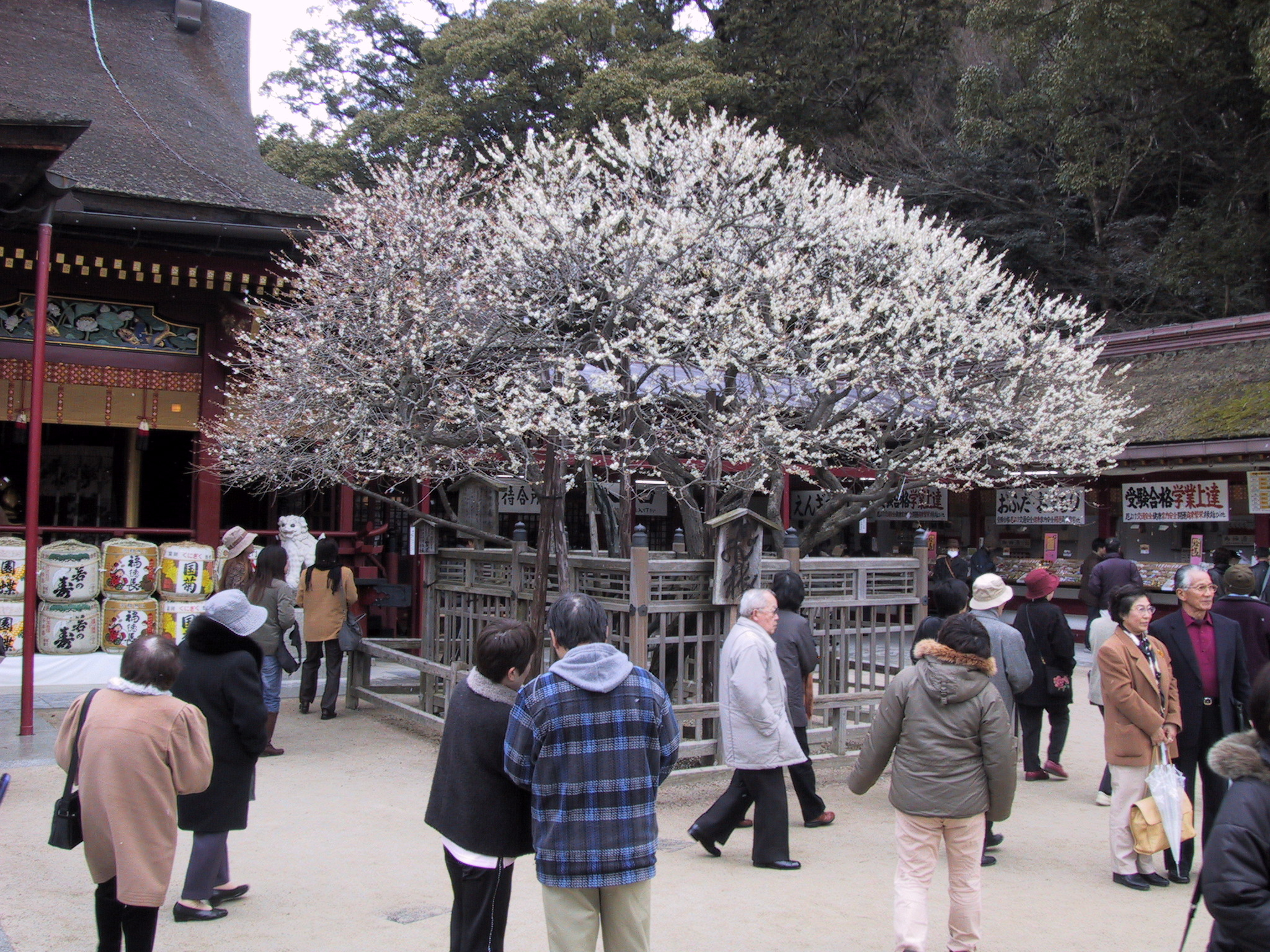
Tobiume, an ume tree

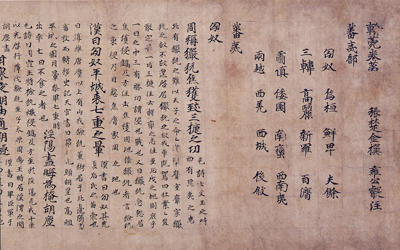
Kan'en, ethnography dating to the Heian period and a National Treasure

The shrine's precinct spans over 3,000 acres (12 km^{2}) and includes several structures. Its honden, or main shrine, was first built by Yasuyuki Umasake in 905, two years after the death of Michizane. A larger structure was constructed by the Fujiwara clan in 919 but was destroyed in a fire during a civil war. The Momoyama-style shrine visitors see today dates from 1591 and is an Important Cultural Property.

The grounds also contain two ponds, a bridge and a treasure house. One pond is a traditional garden style, shinji ike, named for being shaped to resemble the kanji character for "heart."

As well as the main shrine dedicated to Tenjin there are auxiliary and branch shrines of many other kami. The auxiliary shrine honden is an Important Cultural Property.

The shrine is also known for its 6,000 ume (Asian plum) trees belonging to 167 varieties. One tree, known as Tobiume, stands directly to the right of the honden. Legend has it that after Michizane left Kyoto in exile, he yearned so much for this tree that it uprooted itself and flew to Dazaifu Tenman-gū.

Since May 2023, the honden has been undergoing renovations for the first time in 124 years. A temporary hall designed by architect Sou Fujimoto has been constructed in front of the honden and will stay there for the duration of the renovations, which are expected to take about three years. There are 46 types of plants, including Japanese plum trees, planted on the roof of the temporary hall.

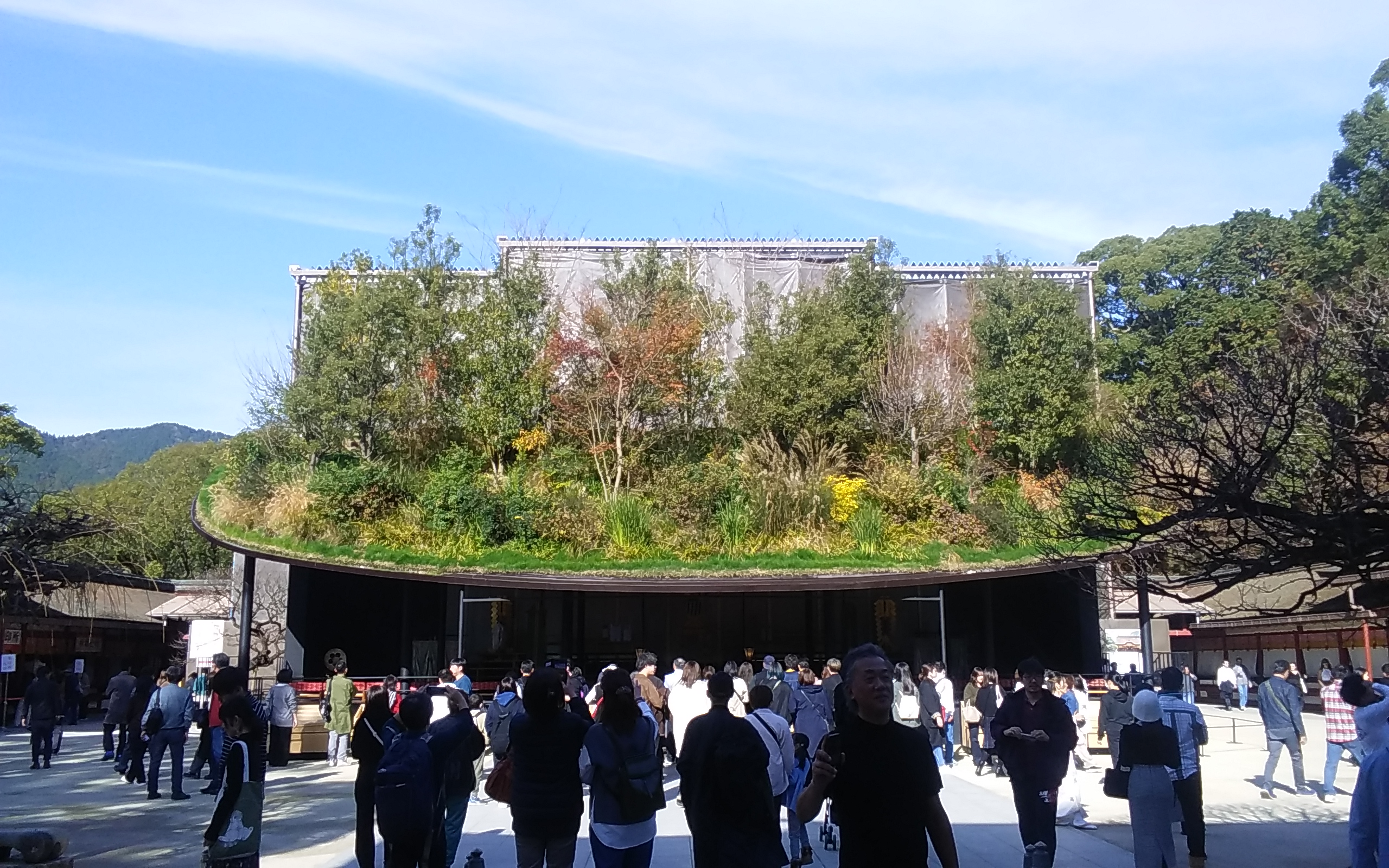
Temporary hall designed by Sou Fujimoto in front of the honden

== Cuisine ==
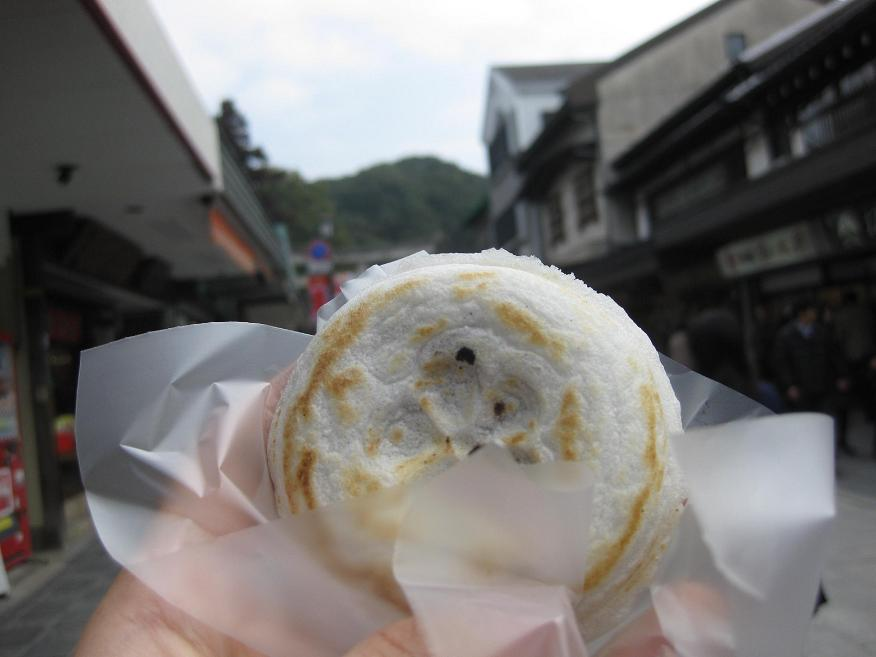
Umegae mochi, and the sando of Dazaifu Tenmangu shrine

Alongside the path to the shrine are shops selling umegae mochi (梅ヶ枝餅), a grilled azuki bean cake stamped with the pattern of a plum tree flower. These snacks are strongly associated with the shrine for their connection to the legend of Michizane. It is said that an elderly caretaker, Jomyoni, prepared the snacks for him, and left one as an offering when he died.

== Treasures ==
The Hōmotsuden houses items including:

- Kan'en, a tenth-century history and ethnography (National Treasure)
- a Heian period tachi (Important Cultural Property)
- a Kamakura period tachi (Important Cultural Property)
- a Muromachi period painted stand (Important Cultural Property)
- documents dating from the Heian period to the Edo period important to the history of Dazaifu and Kyushu (Important Cultural Property)

== See also ==
- Modern system of ranked Shinto Shrines
- List of National Treasures of Japan (writings)
- Kitano Tenman-gū
- Kōmyōzen-ji
- Kanzeon-ji
- List of National Treasures of Japan (writings: Japanese books)
- List of National Treasures of Japan (writings: Chinese books)
- Three Great Tenjin Shrines
- Kyushu National Museum
- Tenjin Matsuri
