= Examination hell =

Annual educational event in Japan

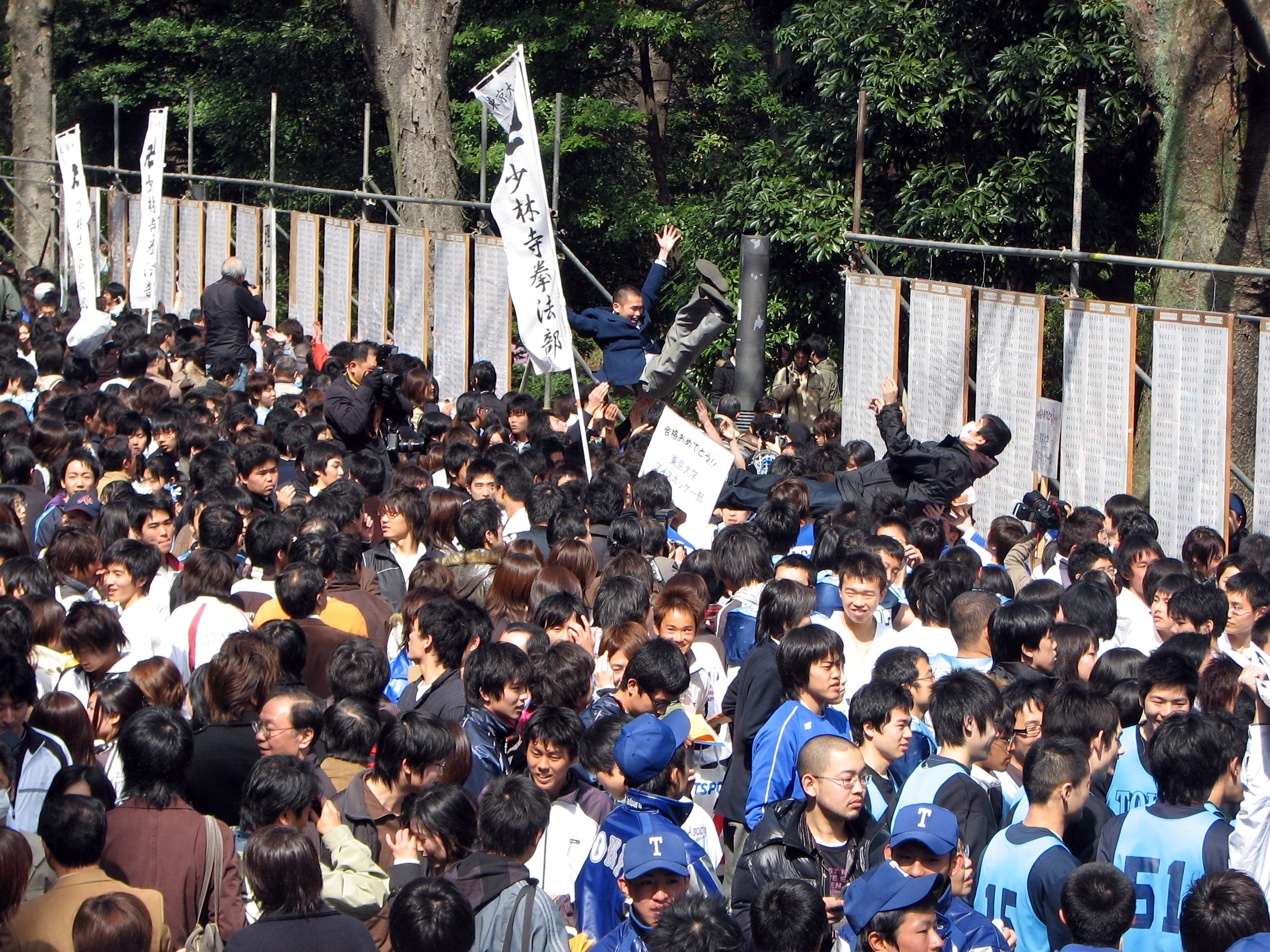
Students celebrate entry into the University of Tokyo.

Examination hell (受験地獄, Juken jigoku) refers to the period between January and March in Japanese society that sees students take important exams to progress onto the next stage of education. The term originated to describe the intensity of the Japanese examination system, but has since been applied to other countries, with students often needing to study for large amounts of time in order to be accepted into Japan's more prestigious schools. The system has been criticised for the high levels of pressure it puts on students to succeed, and the model of education it encourages.

== Definition ==
Examination hell refers to the period of time that students take to study and sit for important school exams that allow them to progress through education. The period takes place during late winter, starting around January. It usually lasts about eight weeks. The term originated in the early 1970s as a shorthand for the rigorous education system and intensity of the examination requirements of Japanese (and later more broadly, East Asian) schools.

== History ==
The modern examination system used in Japan began following the Meiji Restoration of 1868.

From the 1970s, a large education industry was created to support the large number of applicants, including textbooks, cram schools, and hotel 'examination plans'—an inclusive deal that provides spaces and services for students travelling to take entrance exams in different cities. In the late 1980s, it was common for around two thirds of students to fail to achieve their university of choice. The failure rate rose in the late 1960s, before declining slightly, peaking at 44.5% of applicants in 1990. The two increases in the failure rate during the late 1960s and 1990s have been attributed to demographic shifts in Japan as the baby boom generation, and their subsequent children came of age. The failure rate went down dramatically during the 1990s, getting to below 10% in 2008, with it bottoming out at 1.7% of applicant failures in 2022, leading to the suggestion that the term has outlived its usefulness.

== Practice ==
Examination hell often involves long hours of study by students, every day from morning until late at night. During the exam hell period, students pray to kami, especially Tenjin, the patron deity of scholarship. The Tokyo Tenjin Matsuri occurs concurrently with the period with students leaving ema at the deity's shrine seeking divine support.

Critics of the intense exam system have cited the overwhelming pressure placed on students to get into their choice schools, believing that it encourages rote memorisation, and subdues critical thinking. Those who fail become disheartened, with some students who fail the exams taking their own lives.
