= Tenmangū =

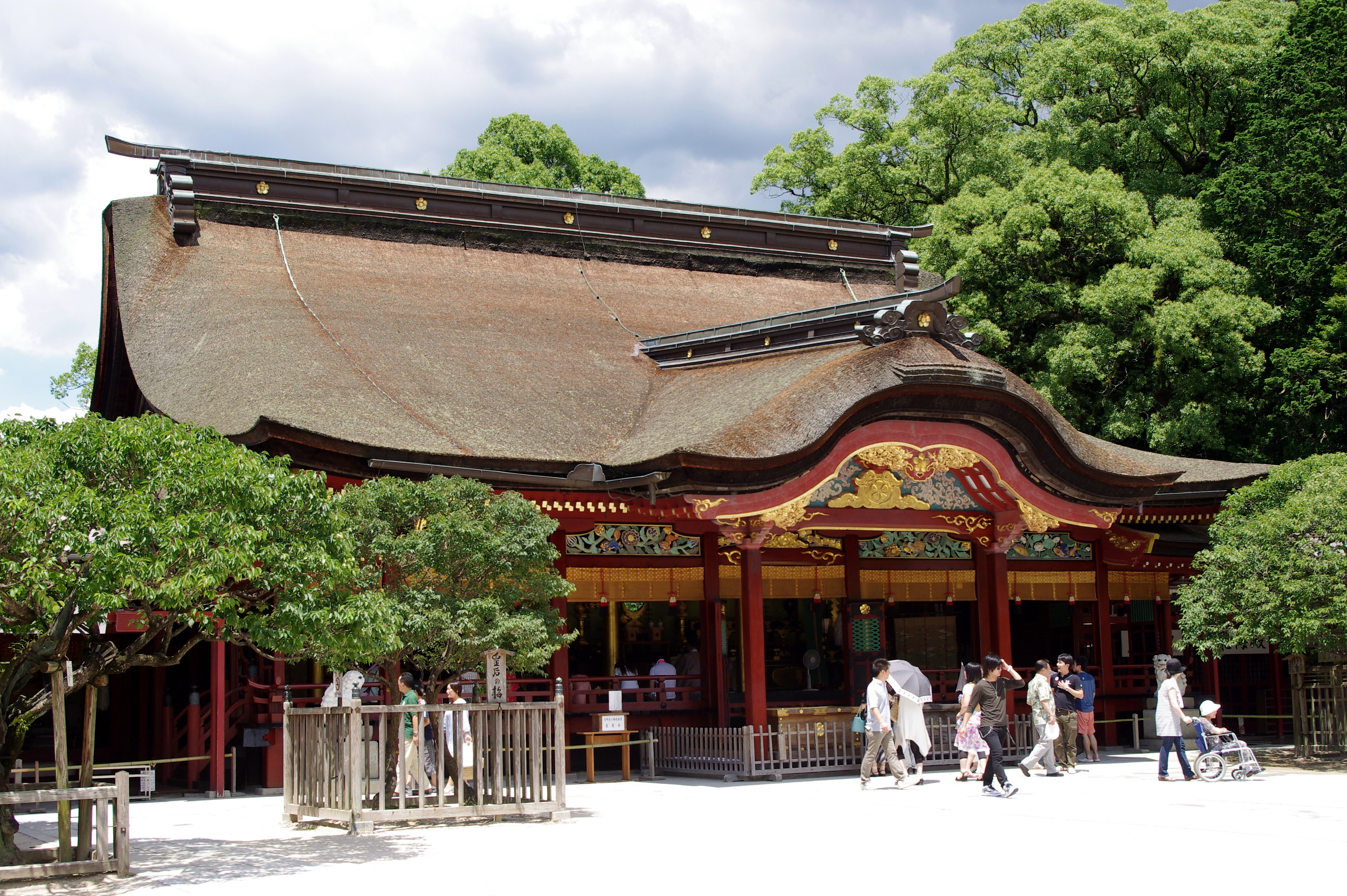
Dazaifu Tenman-gū, One of the head shrine of Tenman-gū.

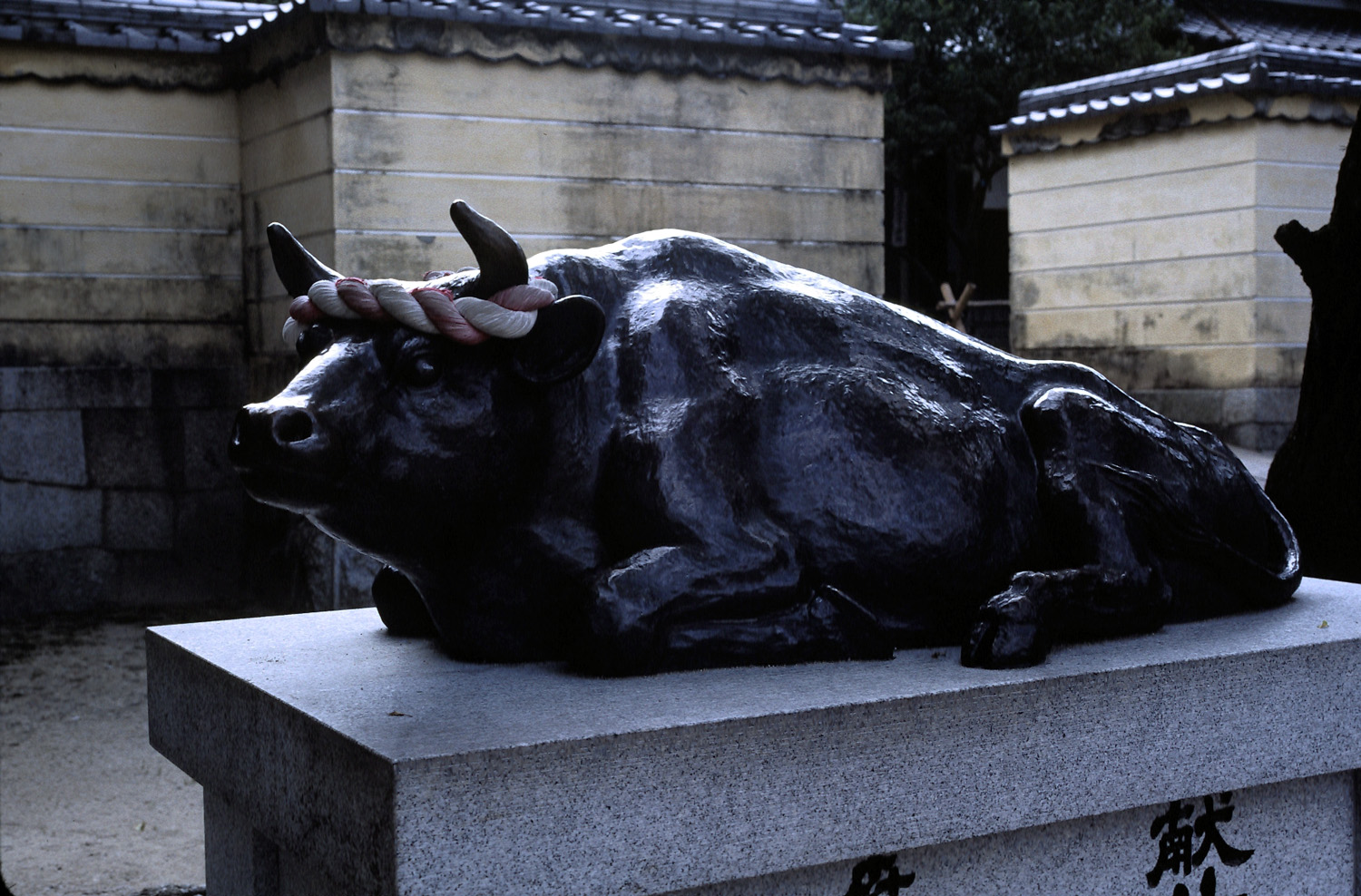
Symbol of Tenman-gū, statue of a cow lying down. (Dazaifu Tenman-gū)

Tenmangū (天満宮) is a Shinto shrine which enshrines Sugawara no Michizane as Tenjin. There are about 14,000 such shrines in Japan; famous examples include:

- Dazaifu Tenmangū (Dazaifu, Fukuoka) -- One of the Sōhonsha (head shrines) of Tenman-gū
- Kitano Tenmangū (Kamigyo, Kyoto) -- Another Sōhonsha of Tenman-gū
- Nagaoka Tenmangū (Nagaokakyo, Kyoto)
- Misode Tenmangū (Onomichi, Hiroshima)
- Osaka Tenmangū (Kita-ku, Osaka)
- Hōfu Tenmangū (Hofu, Yamaguchi)
- Yabo Tenmangū (Kunitachi, Tokyo)
- Yamada Tenmangū, Nagoya
- Yushima Tenmangū (Bunkyo, Tokyo)
- Kameido Tenjin Shrine (Koto, Tokyo)

Dazaifu Tenman-gū and Kitano Tenmangū are often grouped together with another of these shrines and called the "Three Great Tenjin Shrines", but there is no generally accepted criterion for the selection of a third shrine.
