= Osaka Tenmangū =

Shinto shrine in Osaka Prefecture, Japan

Osaka Tenmangū Shrine (大阪天満宮, Ōsaka Tenmangū)
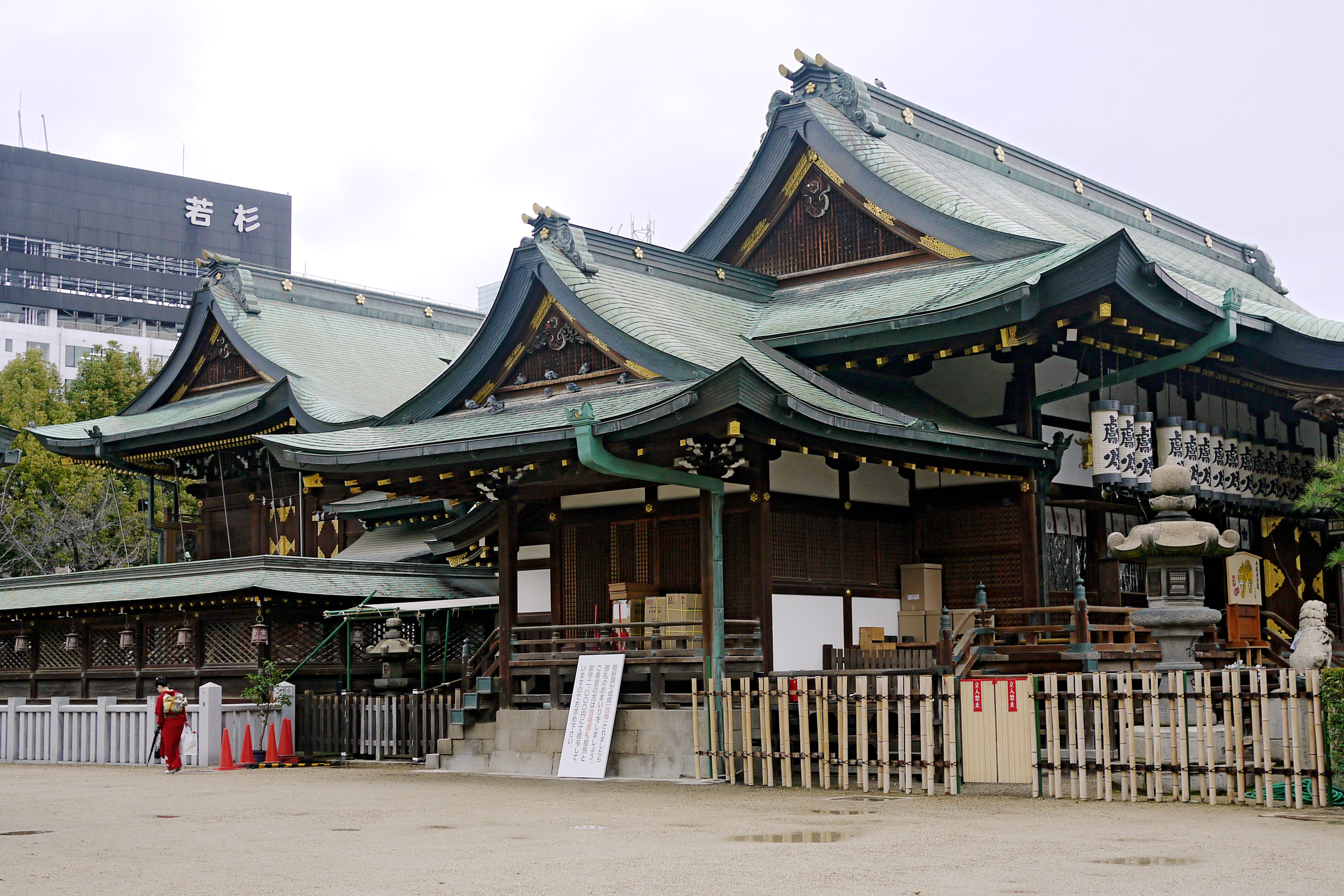
- Osaka Temmangu Shrine's honden and haiden

- Location within Japan

Religion
- Affiliation: Shinto
- Deity: Tenjin

Location
- Interactive map of Osaka Tenmangū Shrine (大阪天満宮, Ōsaka Tenmangū)
- Coordinates: 34°41′45.69″N 135°30′45.43″E

The Osaka Tenmangū Shrine (大阪天満宮, Ōsaka Tenmangū) is a Shinto shrine and one of Tenmangū founded in AD 949 in Osaka by Emperor Murakami. The Tenjin Festival is held here annually from 24 July to 25 July. The shrine has been periodically destroyed by fire, with the present entrance hall and gate built in 1845.

== Nearest stations ==
- Ōsakatemmangū Station on the West Japan Railway Company (JR West) JR Tōzai Line
- Minami-morimachi Station on the two lines of Osaka Municipal Subway.
