= Tenjin Matsuri =

Annual festival in Japan

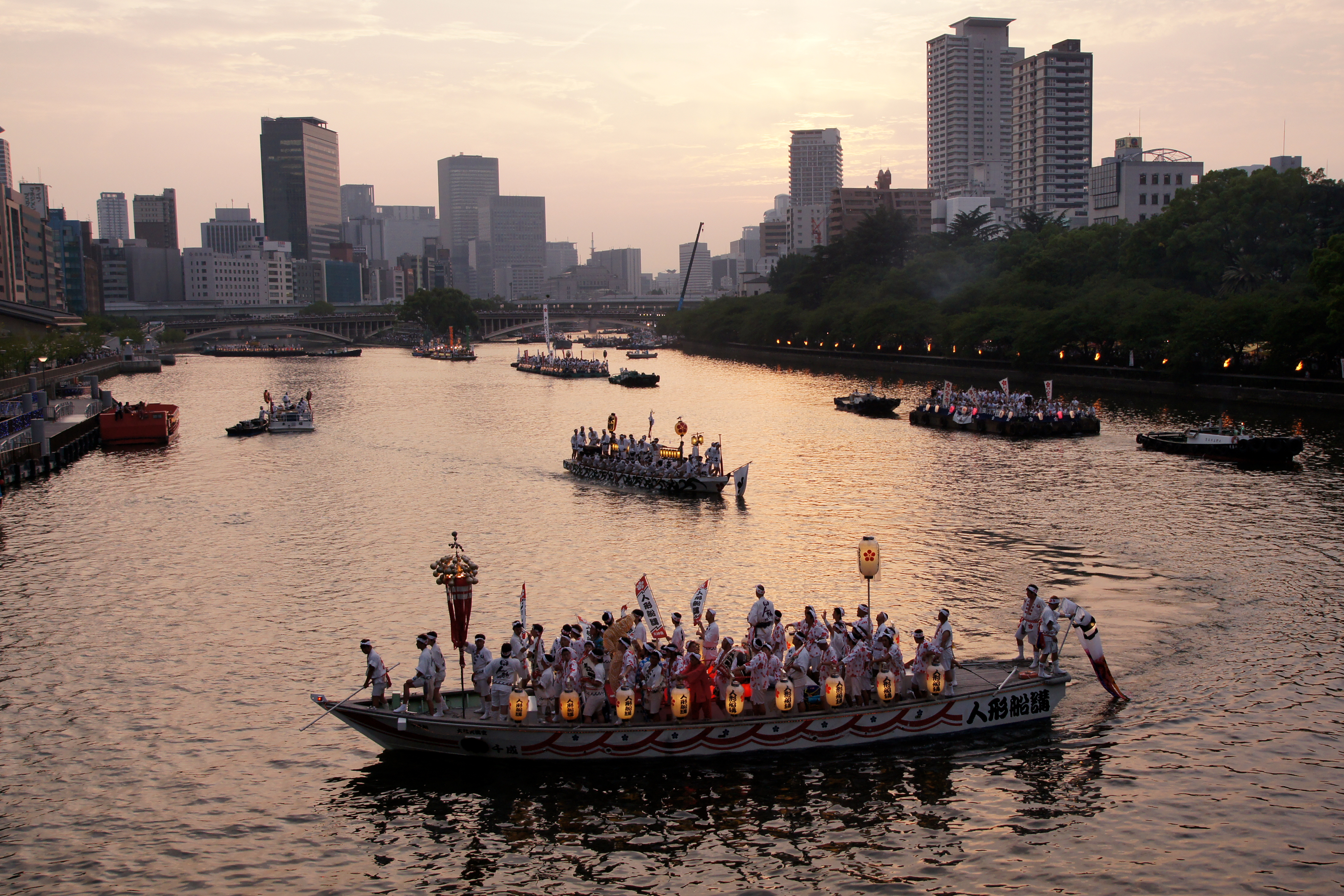
- Tenjin Matsuri in Osaka, the river boat procession on the Ōkawa
- Type: Shinto
- Significance: Public festival
- Observances: Street procession, boat parade, kagura
- Date: c. 25 of the month
- Frequency: Annual

Tenjin Matsuri (Japanese: 天神祭, Hepburn: Tenjin Matsuri) is a festival held throughout Japan around the 25th of the month every year at various Tenmangū shrines. The festival commemorates the death anniversary of the deity Sugawara no Michizane. The month of observance varies between shrines, of these festivals, the one held on 25 July at Osaka Tenmangū Shrine is the largest. Ranking with the Gion Matsuri in Kyoto and Kanda Matsuri in Tokyo, the Tenjin Matsuri is considered to be one of the three major Shintō festivals in Japan. Its original purpose was to appease the spirit of Michizane, who was thought to have combined with the thunder god Tenjin.

The Kishiwada Danjiri and Tenjin Matsuri are considered the two key festivals of Osaka, together with the Sumiyoshi and Ikutama Festivals, it comprises one of the three large summer festivals in Osaka. The celebrations climax with a 100 river-boat procession and fireworks show. The reflection of fireworks and lanterns on the Okawa River give it its alternative name of the Festival of Fire and Water.

== Background ==
During the Heian period, Sugawara no Michizane was slighted by the imperial court, dying in exile in Kyushu in the year 903. Shortly following Michizane's death, droughts, fires, and epidemics afflicted medieval Japan, with many of his former political rivals dying suddenly. The court at the time considered Michizane to have combined with the god Tenjin—who is associated with both scholarship and thunder. To placate him, a shrine was dedicated to his spirit at Kitano in 947. Following the enlargement of this shrine by Fujiwara no Morosuke in 959, the shrine and related dedications to Michizane played a role in factional rivalries within the Fujiwara clan.

In myth, Michizane also has an association with cattle. The stories that indicate this connection include: Michizane's year of birth and coming-of-age taking place in the year of the ox, the sudden apparition of a bull that killed some attempted assassins, and the incident after his death that saw the cow pulling his body to stop in its tracks (so that he would be buried at that location). During the Tenjin Matsuri, many worshippers pay their respect to statues of bulls, as it is seen to share an intimate connection with the deity.

== History ==
=== Japan ===
The first recorded festival dedicated to Tenjin took place at Kitano Tenmangū Shrine in 987, with the first imperial pilgrimage taking place in 1004 under Emperor Ichijō. Over time, the belief in Michizane as the god Tenjin spread throughout the country, replacing various local beliefs about the deity.

As of 1996 there were 10,441 shrines across Japan dedicated to Sugawara no Michizane.

=== Osaka ===
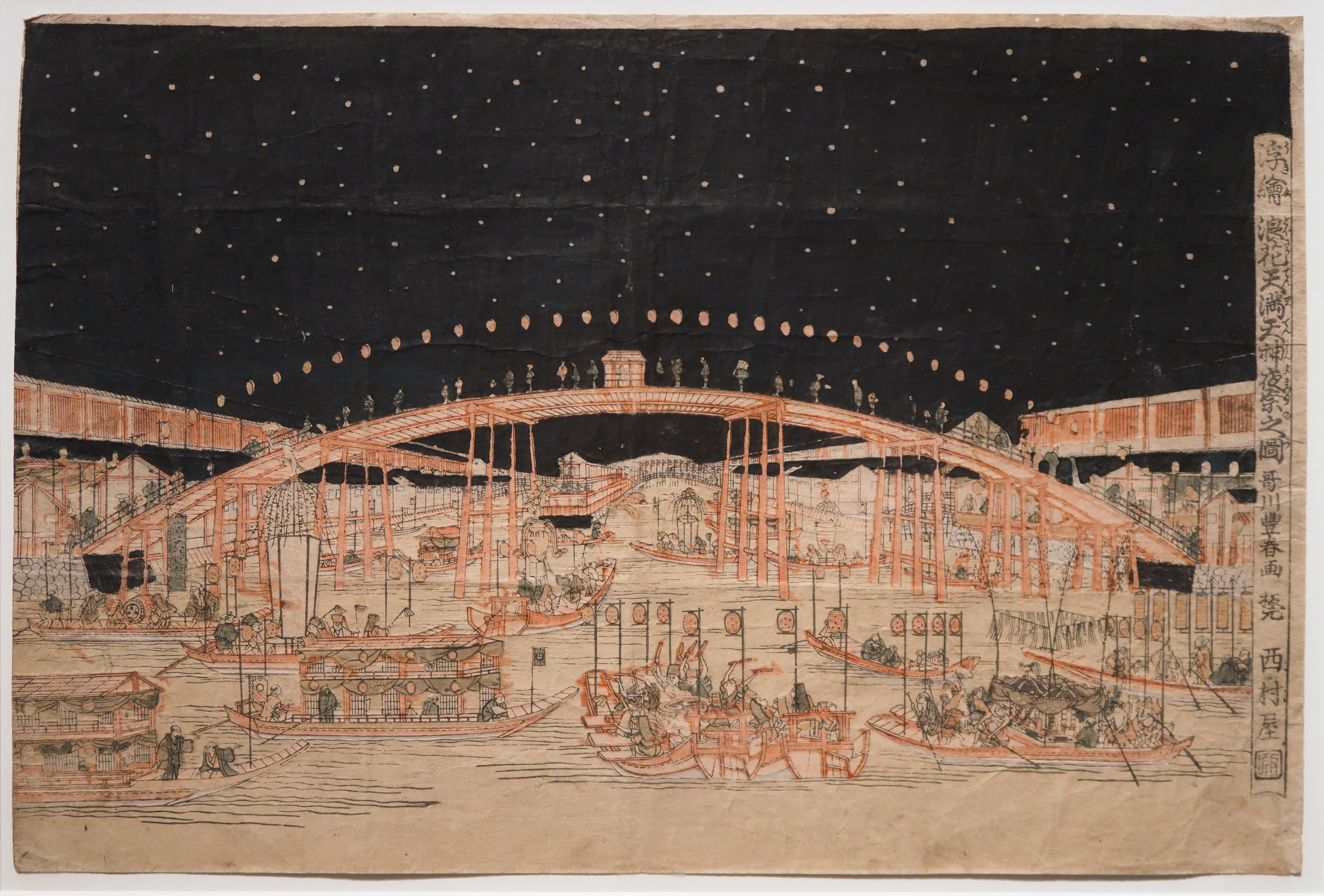
Utagawa Toyoharu's ukiyo-e print, The Festive Evening at Tenman Tenjin Shrine in Osaka (1770–1775)

The legendary history of the Osaka festival states that the first dedications to Tenjin began in the year 951 AD, two years after the establishment of Osaka's Tenmangū Shrine in 949, with the use of the Hokonagashi Ritual (鉾流神事, hokonagashi shinji) to decide where that year's temporary shrine would be located. In the beginning of the Edo Period, the Hokonogashi Ritual was abolished as superfluous as a permanent shrine had been established. The ritual was re-introduced by popular demand in 1930. The form of the boat procession had been established by the time of Toyotomi Hideyoshi (late 16th century), and during the Edo Period, the festival flourished as a symbol of Osaka's prosperity. By the early 19th century, the festival became a major summer event. Despite being paused on numerous occasions due to socio-political upheavals, the festival was restarted after the Second World War in 1949.

The Tenjin Festival has sponsored the "Tenjin Festival Action Plan for Zero Garbage" which has aimed to reduce the amount of combustible material produced as a result of the festival. The organisation was inspired by a similar effort by the Gion Festival that started in 2014. In the first year of its implementation, the amount of combustible garbage generated was halved. In 2017, yakuza were excluded from participating in the boat parade and sponsoring fireworks displays as part of an increasing government campaign to clamp down on organised crime. During the COVID-19 Pandemic, the festival was put on hold, with the first full festival taking place in July 2023.

== The Festival ==
=== Japan ===
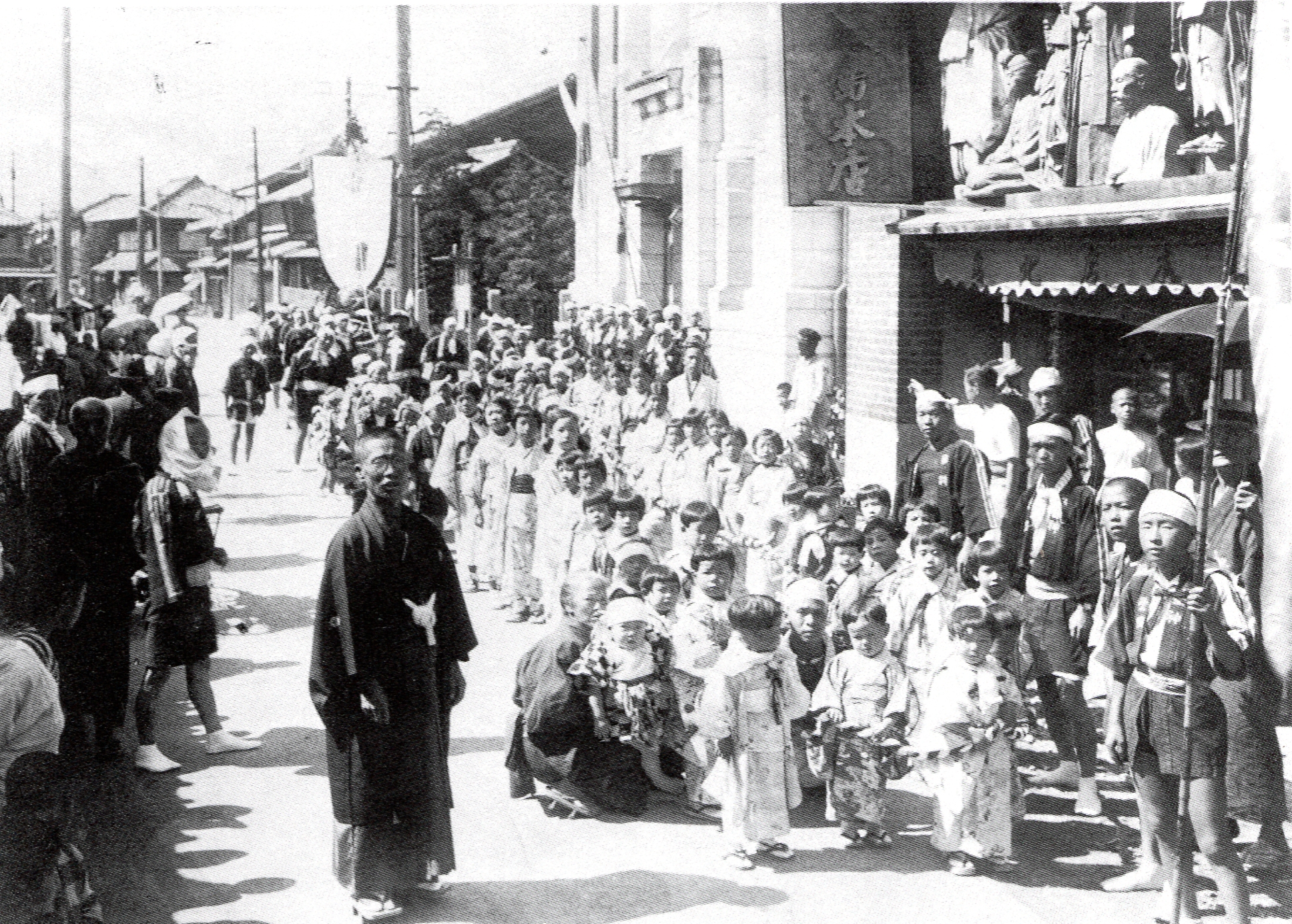
Tenjin Matsuri at Okazaki Tenmangu Shrine in Aichi Prefecture, 1920s

Rituals and dates differ between shrines but most festivals take place on or around the 25th of a given month. For instance, Yushima Tenmangū in Tokyo holds a festival starting on 25th February, the date that Sugawara no Michizane died in exile. The festival coincides with the yearly plum blossom, considered a symbol of Tenjin such that the blossoms are used to represent the shrine, with worshippers giving offerings of shaped sweet cakes and five-yen coins. As the festival takes place during examination hell, many of the people paying their respects during the festival are prospective students to high school and university. On the first day of the festival, a calligraphy ceremony is held; with later celebrations including performances of ikebana, tea ceremony, and taiko. The shrine at Okazaki holds its festival from between the 23rd to the 26th of September every year. Celebrations include a kendo tournament and a dedication kagura. The final Tenjin Matsuri of the season takes place on 25 December at Kitano Tenmangū, the original place of Michizane's enshrinement.

=== Osaka ===
The Tenjin Matsuri takes place in Osaka on 24 and 25 July. The Hokonagashi Ritual takes place early in the morning on the 24 July: a student is selected to go to the shrine by the Okawa River; they are given a sacred spear (神鉾, kamihoko), and must float it on the river. The divine spirit is carried to the place where the spear floats. Beginning at the Tenmangū Shrine, a street procession (陸渡御, rikutogyo) consisting of actors, dancers, and a mikoshi containing the enshrined Sugawara no Michizane is brought to the Okawa River and loaded into boats at the Hokonogashi Bridge. About 100 different groups participate in the boat parade (船渡御, funatogyo).

At around 7.30pm the fireworks display starts and usually lasts about 90 minutes.

Traditional food associated with the festival includes chilled somen noodles and pike conger.
