= Yamada Tenmangū =

Shinto shrine in Nagoya, Japan

Coordinates: 35°11′45″N 136°56′18″E

Yamada Tenman-gū is a Shinto shrine located in Nagoya, central Japan.

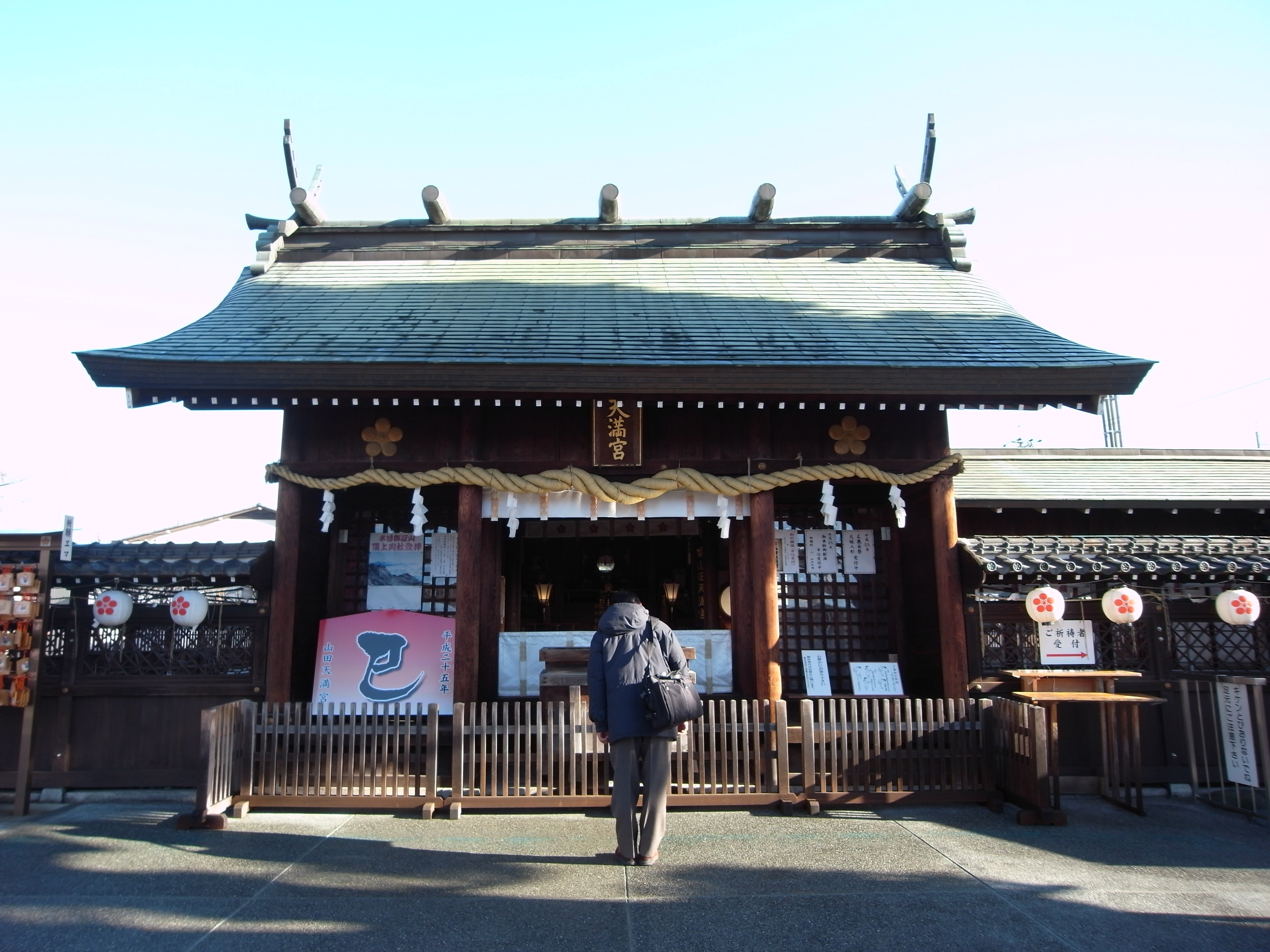

The deity of this shrine is Sugawara no Michizane. According to legend, the shrine was constructed in 1672 as a guardian to Nagoya Castle and as place to pray for academic wishes in the Owari Province. In 1983, the Kogane shrine was merged into this shrine.

The Usokae Ritual is held here on every 25 January.
