= Yushima Tenmangū =

Shinto shrine in Tokyo, Japan

Yushima Tenman-gū 湯島天満宮
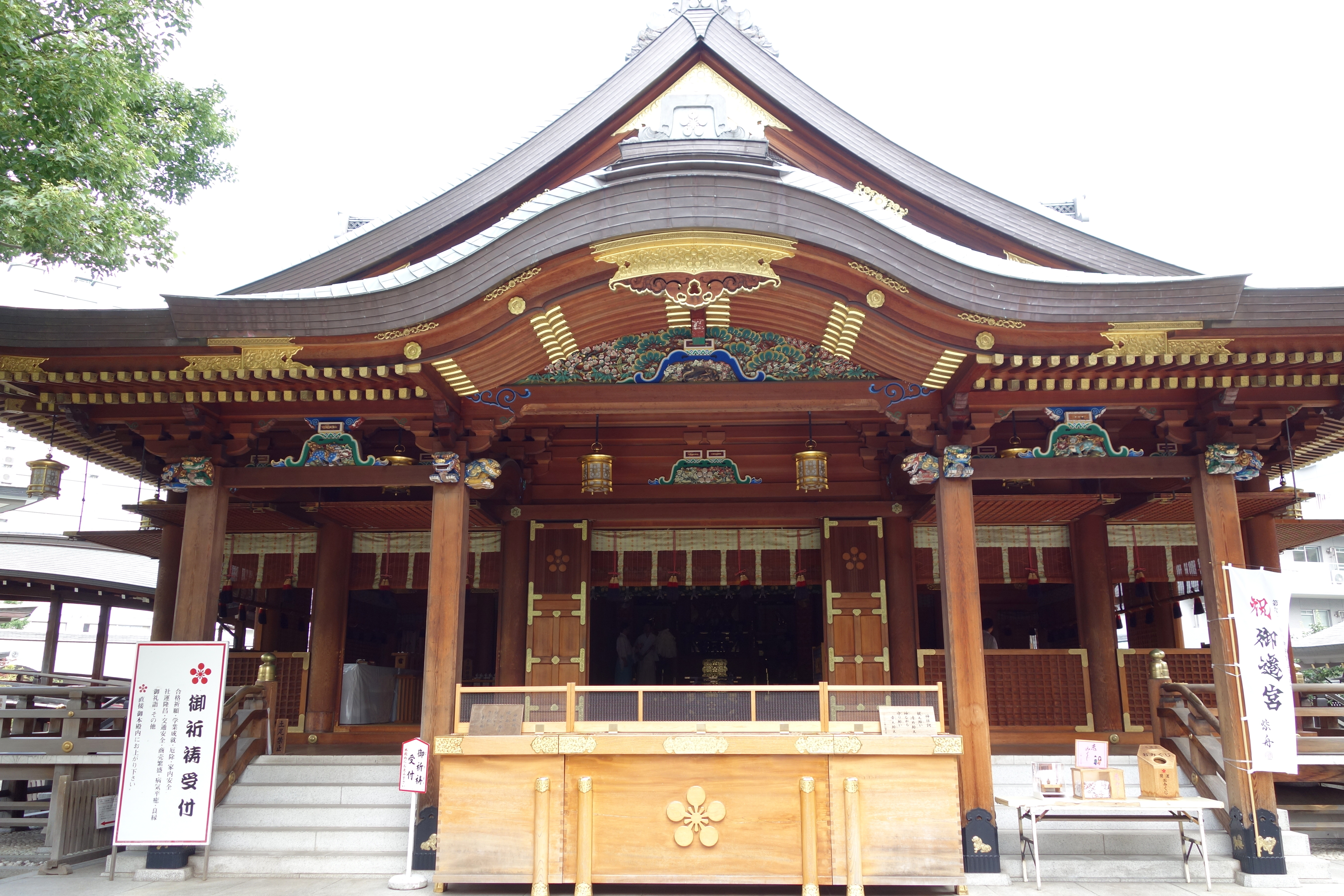
- front view of the haiden

- Location within Japan

Religion
- Affiliation: Shinto
- Deity: Tenjin (Sugawara no Michizane); Ame-no-Tajikarao-mikoto
- Type: Tenman-gū

Location
- Location: 3 Chome-30-1 Yushima, Bunkyō, Tokyo 〒 113-0034
- Interactive map of Yushima Tenman-gū 湯島天満宮
- Coordinates: 35°42′28″N 139°46′6″E

Architecture
- Established: 458

Website
- www.yushimatenjin.or.jp/pc/eng-page/english.htm

Yushima Tenman-gū (湯島天満宮) is a Shinto shrine located in the Bunkyō ward of Tokyo, Japan.

Established in 458, it is now devoted to Tenjin, the kami of Learning. For this reason, it is also called Yushima Tenjin.

It is located very close to Ueno Park, and not far from the University of Tokyo. It is frequently visited by prospective students hoping to pass the entrance exams, especially during the entrance exam season in winter. At this time, the shrine receives many offerings of ema, votive tablets to petition the kami for success.

One of the most famous features of the shrine are the blossoms of his plum trees (ume) in the spring. In February and March, the annual festival Ume Matsuri is held, attracting many visitors.

== History ==
Yushima Tenman-gū was originally established for the worship of Ame-no-Tajikarao-mikoto (天手力雄命), a kami associated with sports and physical power found in Japanese mythology (most famously in the Kojiki and Nihon Shoki).

In February 1355 the shrine was expanded to enshrine the kami Tenjin (天神) as well. Tenjin is the deification of Sugawara no Michizane (845–903), a famous scholar, poet and politician from the Heian period. As a kami he is associated to scholarship and learning. Currently both kami are enshrined in Yushima Tenman-gū.

The shrine was later rebuilt in October 1455 at the behest of local warlord Ota Dokan (1432–1486), and enjoyed greater popularity during the Edo period when it was visited by such Confucian scholars as Hayashi Doshun (1583–1657) and Arai Hakuseki (1657–1725).

The current structures of Yushima Tenman-gū were rebuilt in 1995. They were made using only cypress, and following closely the tradition of Shinto architecture.

== Gallery ==
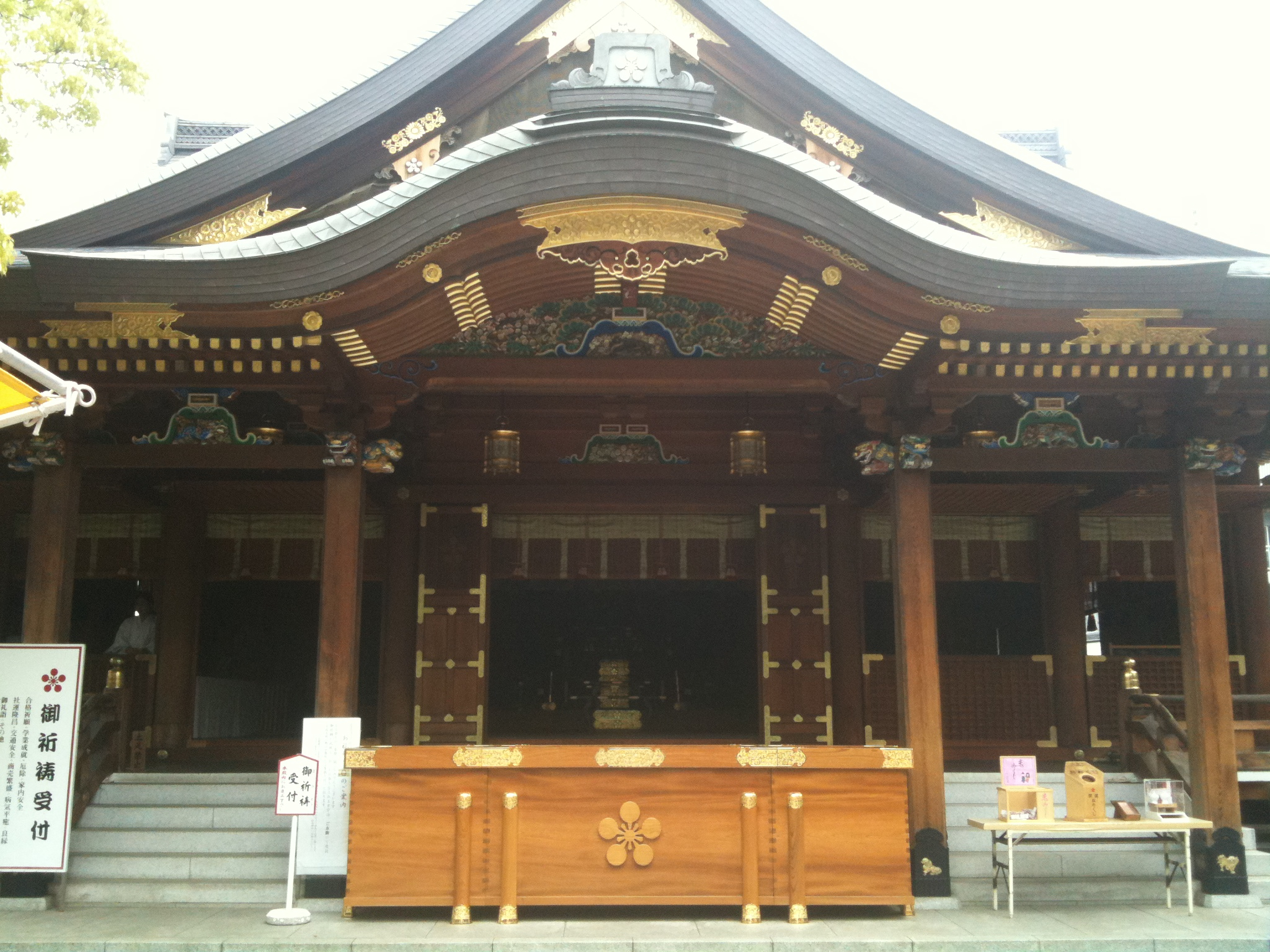
Main hall

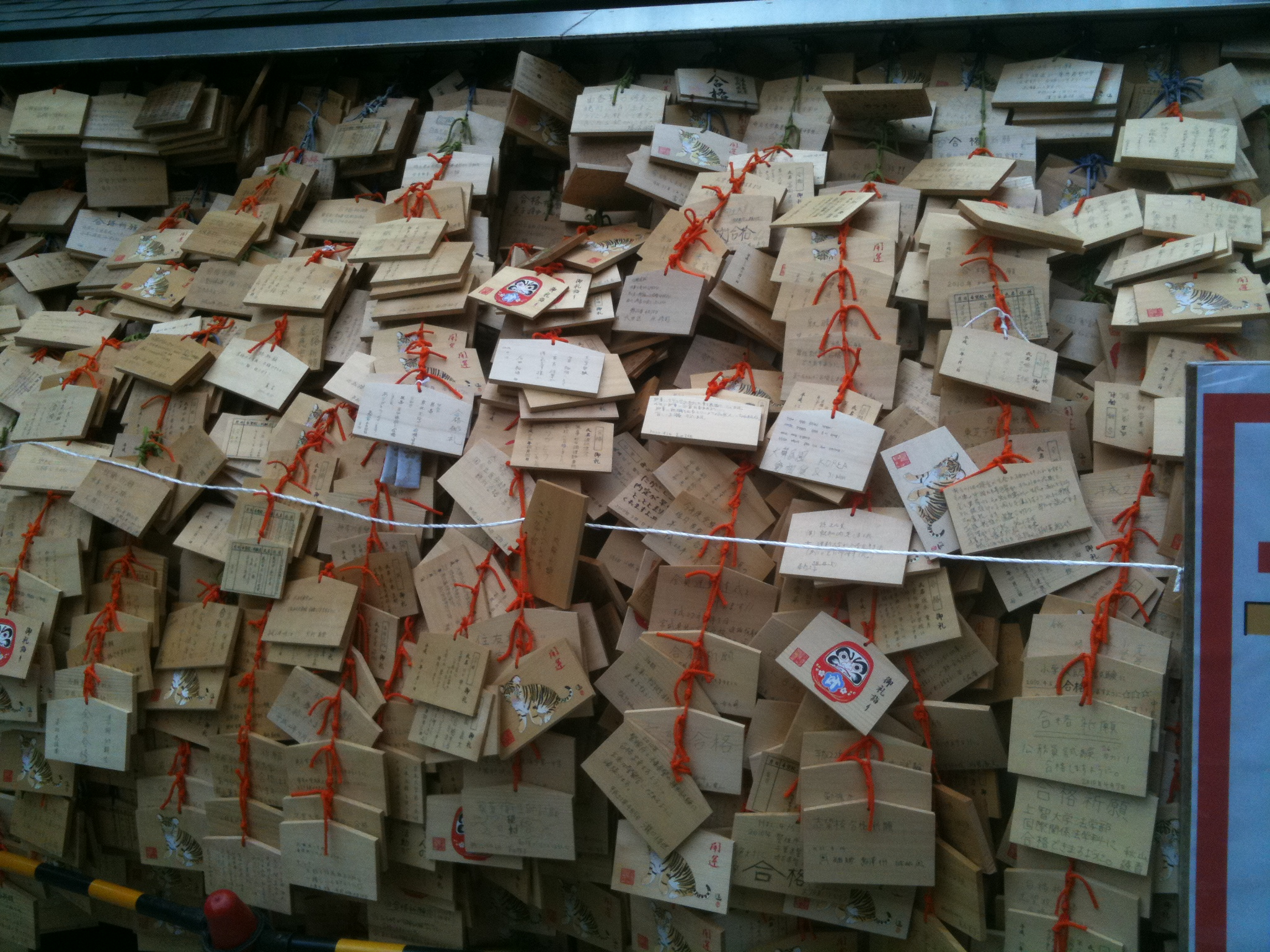
Ema offered at Yushima Tenmangu

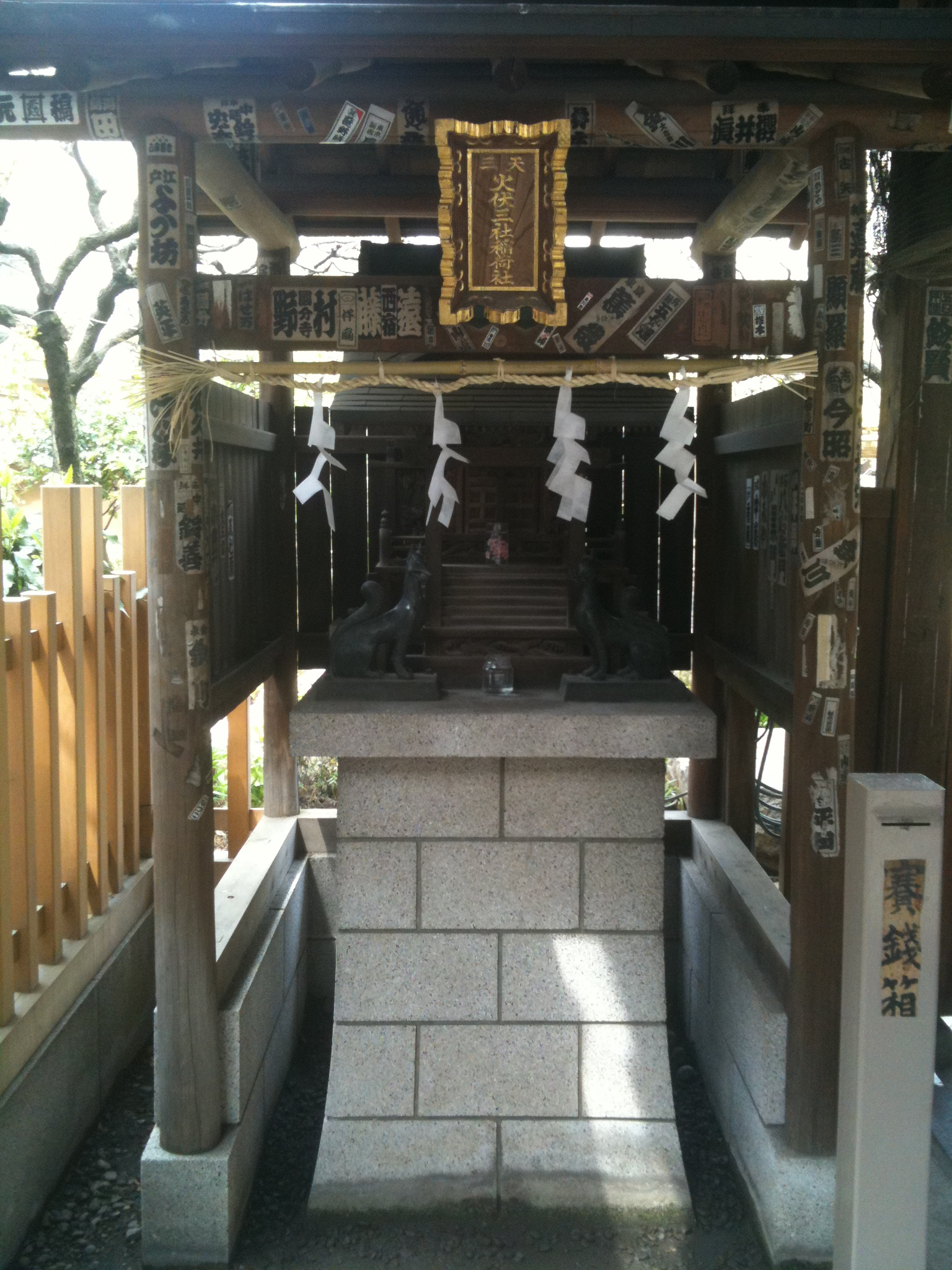
Inari no Kami sub-shrine

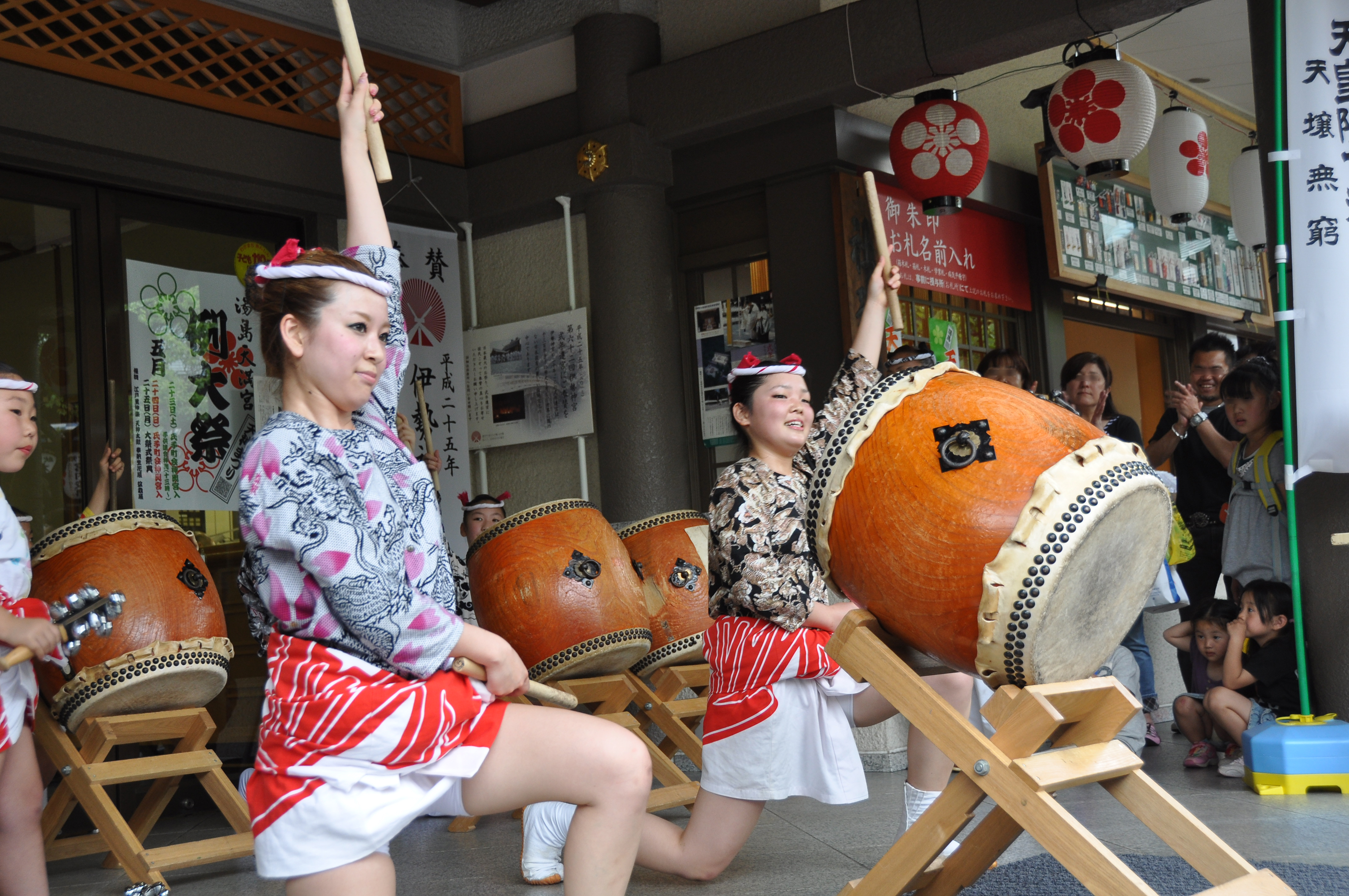
Reitaisai

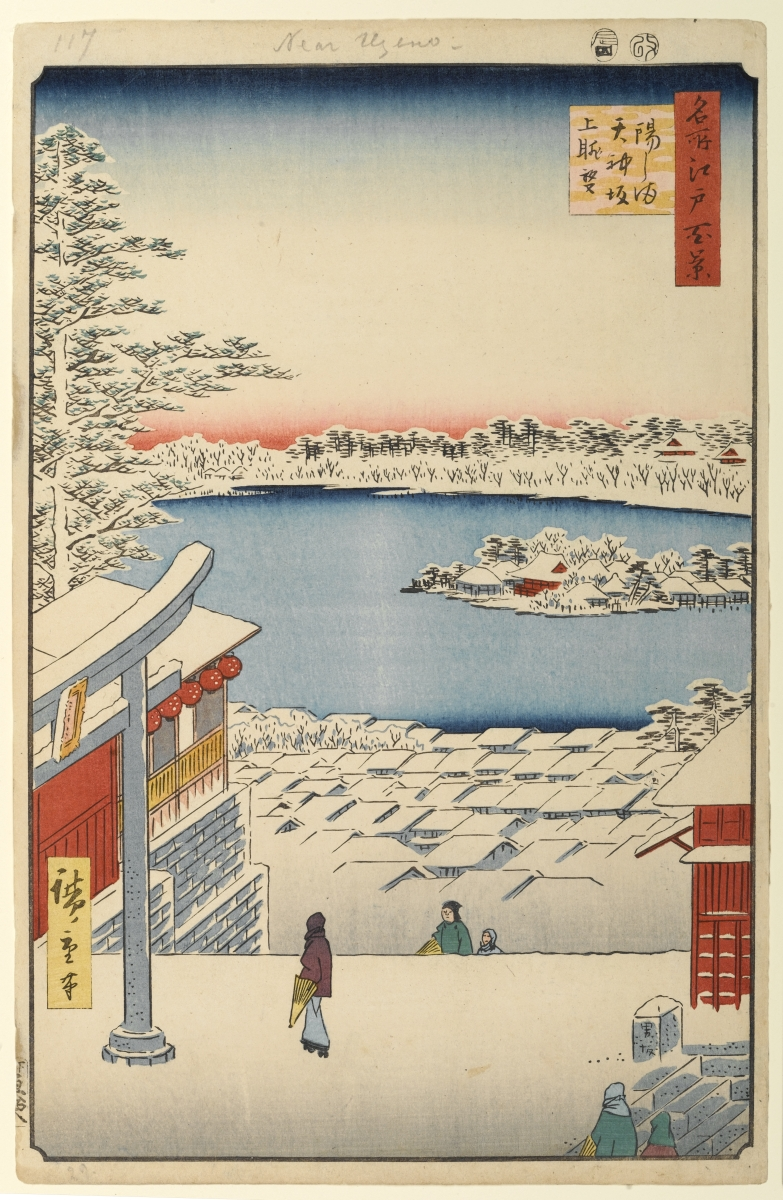
Hiroshige

== Annual events ==
The yearly events and festival at Yushima Tenman-gū are:

- Hatsumōde (New Year's visit) 1 – 7 January
- Ume Matsuri (Plum trees festival) 7 February – 7 March
- Tenjin-sai (The grand festival) 25 May
- Kiku Matsuri (The chrysanthemums flowers festival) 1 – 23 November

== Access ==
There is no admission fee for visitors to enter the shrine precincts. It is open from 6 am to 8 pm (the shop from 8:30 am to 7 pm).

The entrances is at a 2-minute walk from Exit 3 of Yushima Station on the Chiyoda Line.

== Branch ==
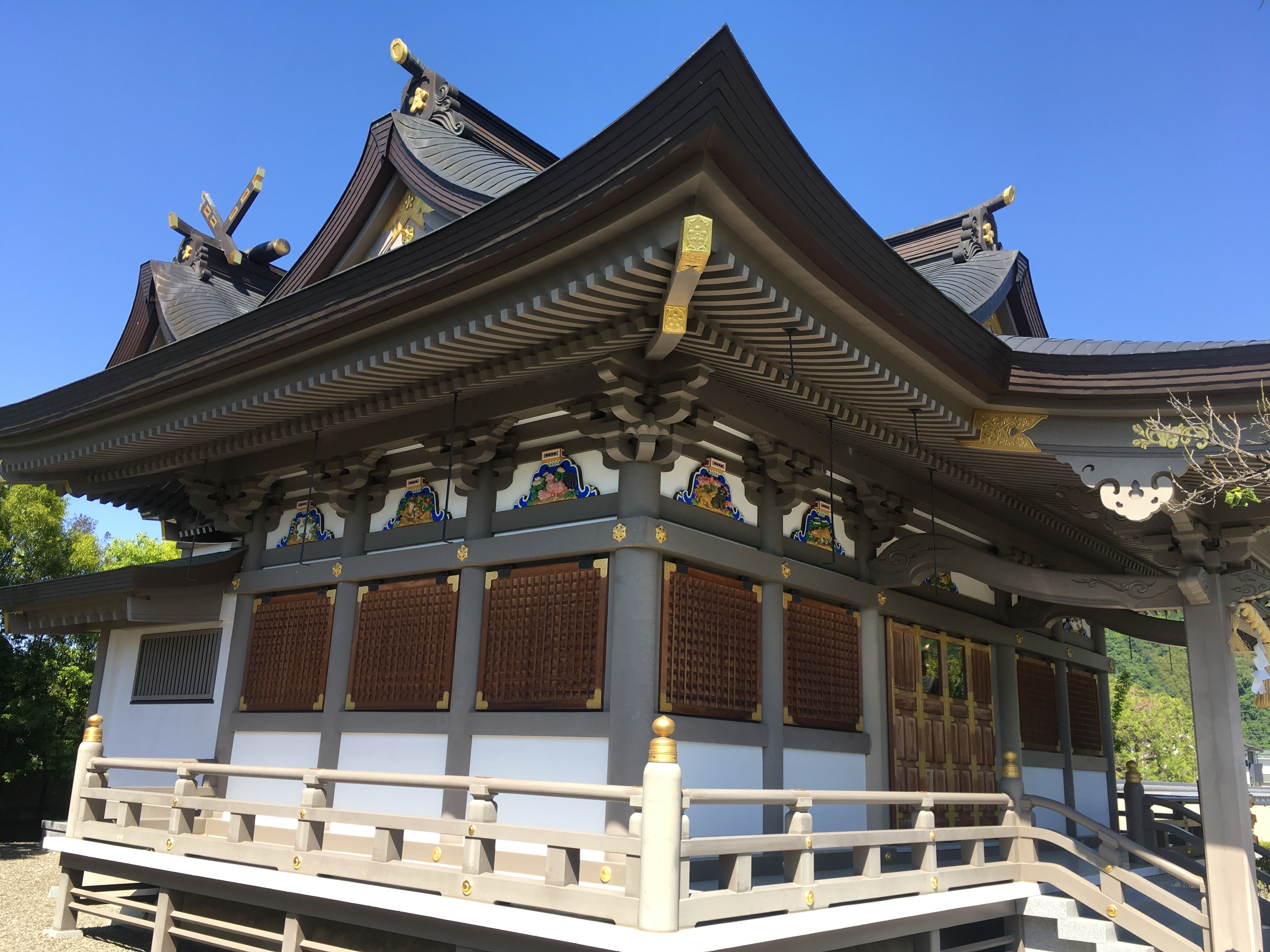
Yushimatennmangu Branch Shrine in Wakaho, Nagano (city)

There is a branch of Yushima Tenmangū located in the Wakahowatauchi district of Nagano (city) next to the Kitano Museum of Art
