= Kitano Tenmangū =

Shinto shrine in Kyoto, Japan

Kitano Tenmangū Shrine 北野天満宮
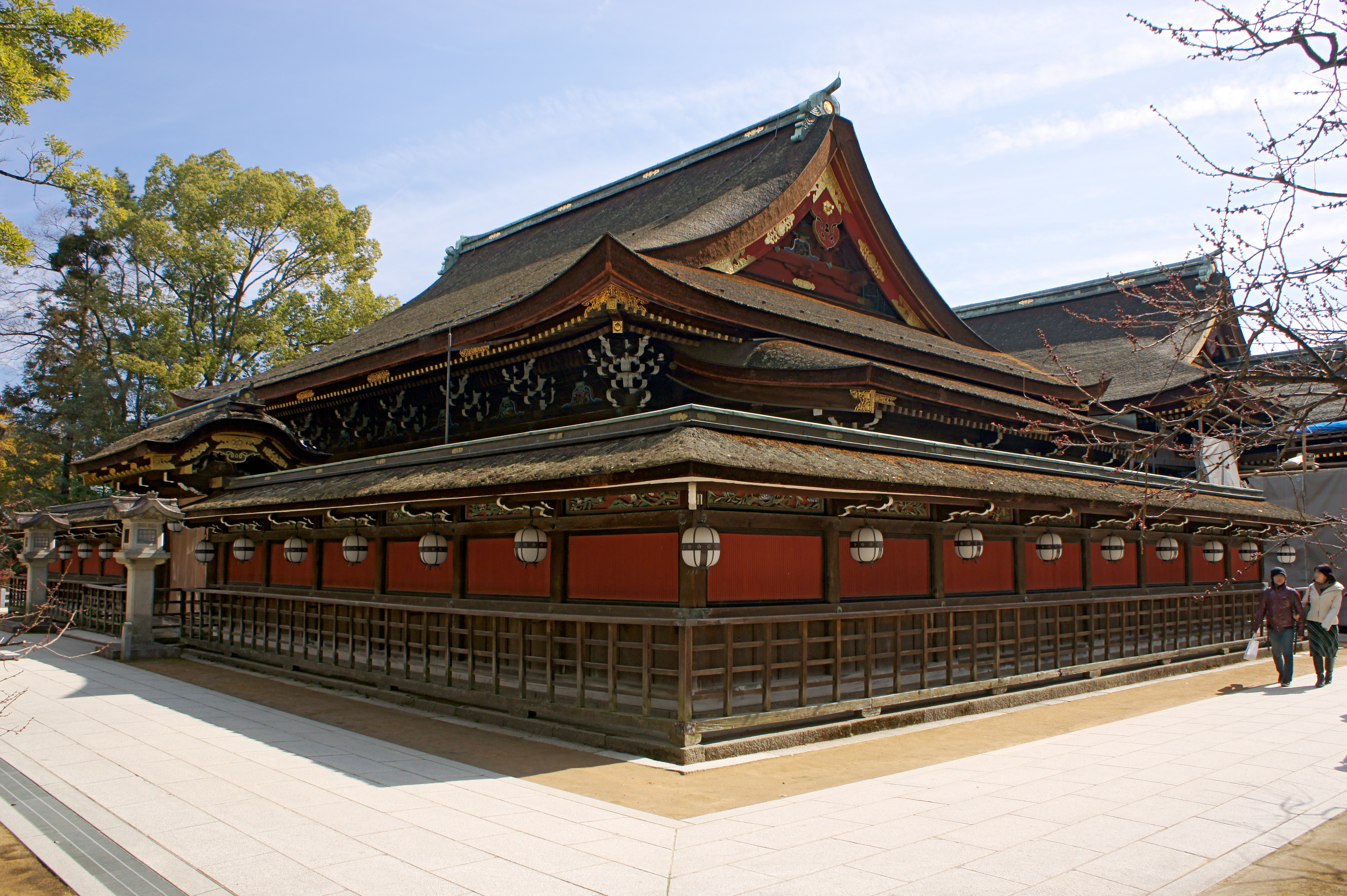
- The honden, or main building.

- Location within Japan

Religion
- Affiliation: Shinto
- Deity: Sugawara no Michizane
- Festival: Reitaisai (August 4th)
- Type: Tenmangū

Location
- Location: Hakuraku-chō, Kamigyō-ku, Kyoto
- Interactive map of Kitano Tenmangū Shrine 北野天満宮
- Coordinates: 35°01′52″N 135°44′07″E

Architecture
- Style: Gongen-zukuri
- Established: 947

Website
- www.kitanotenmangu.or.jp

Kitano Tenmangū (北野天満宮, Kitano-Tenmangu) is a Shinto shrine in Kamigyō-ku, Kyoto, Japan.

== History ==
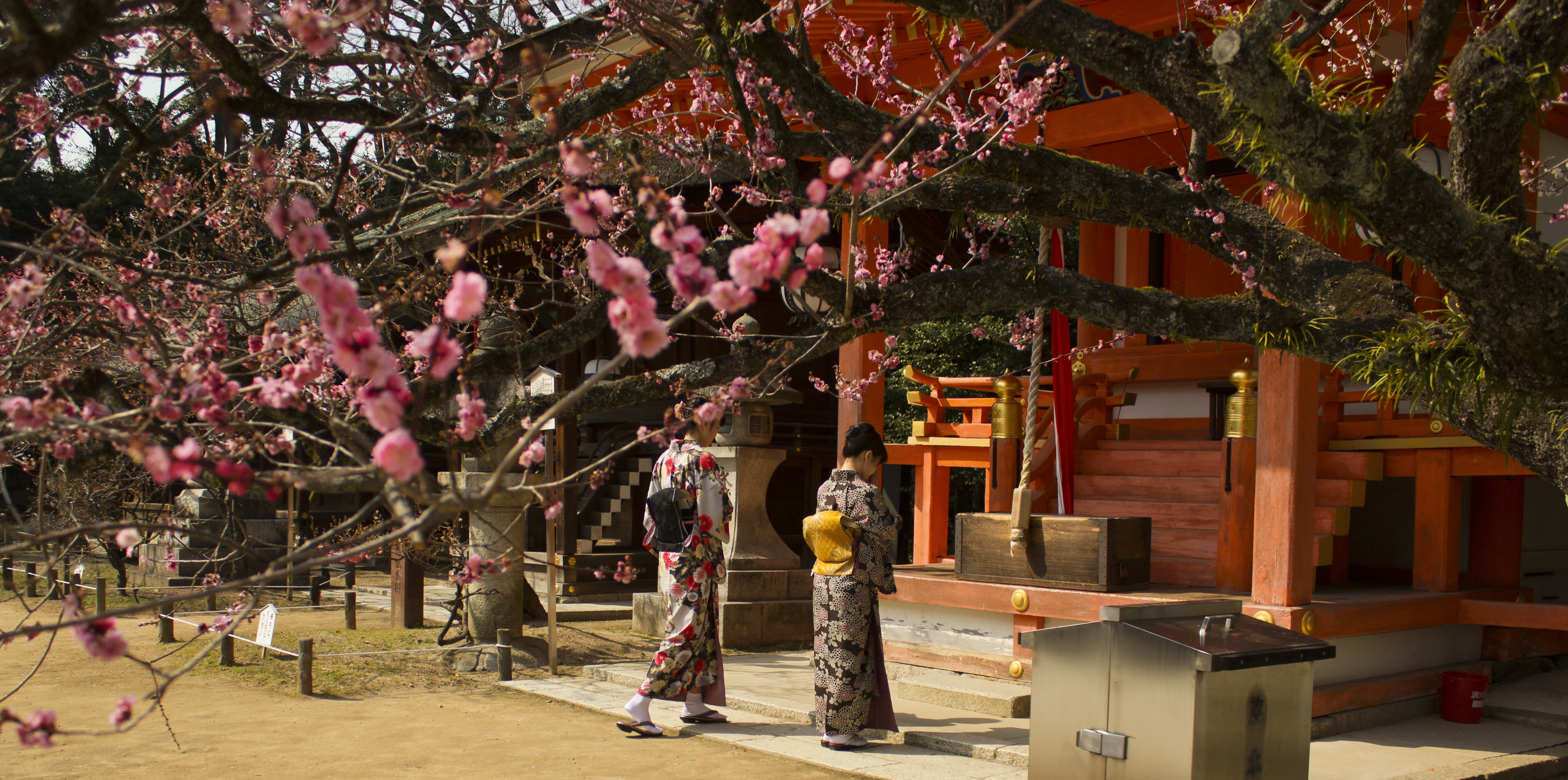
Two women praying in front of the chishusha (地主社)

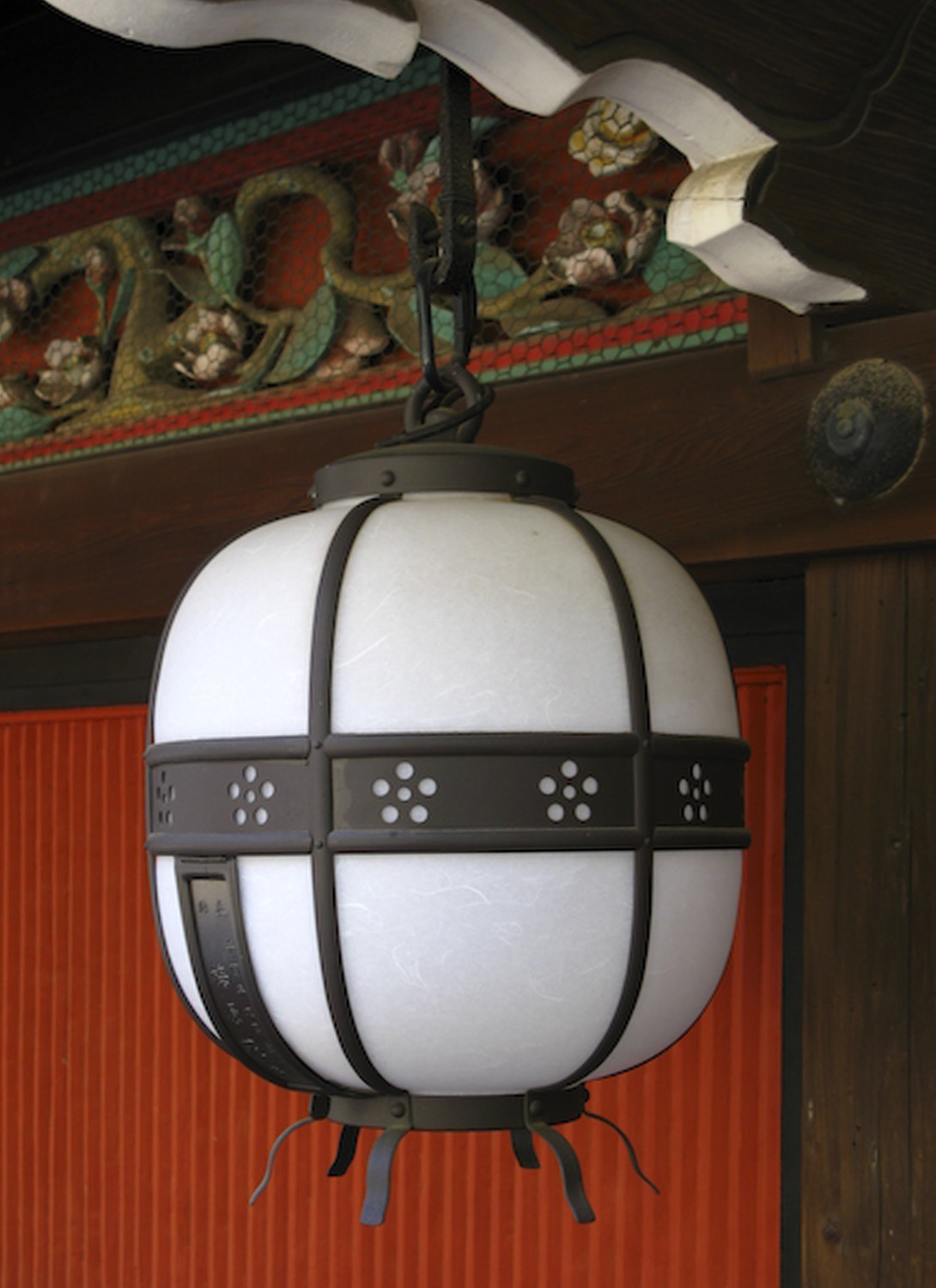
Lanterns hang from the eaves of the main buildings.

The shrine was first built in 947 to appease the angry spirit of bureaucrat, scholar and poet Sugawara no Michizane, who had been exiled as a result of political maneuvers of his enemies in the Fujiwara clan.

The shrine became the object of Imperial patronage during the early Heian period. In 965, Emperor Murakami ordered that Imperial messengers be sent to report important events to the guardian kami of Japan. These messengers initially presented gifts called heihaku to 16 shrines; and in 991, Emperor Ichijō added three more shrines to Murakami's list — including Kitano.

From 1871 through 1946, the Kitano Tenman-gū was officially designated one of the Kanpei-chūsha (官幣中社), meaning that it stood in the second rank of government supported shrines.

== Tenjin ==
The shrine was dedicated to Michizane; and in 986, the scholar-bureaucrat was deified and the title of "Tenjin" was conferred.

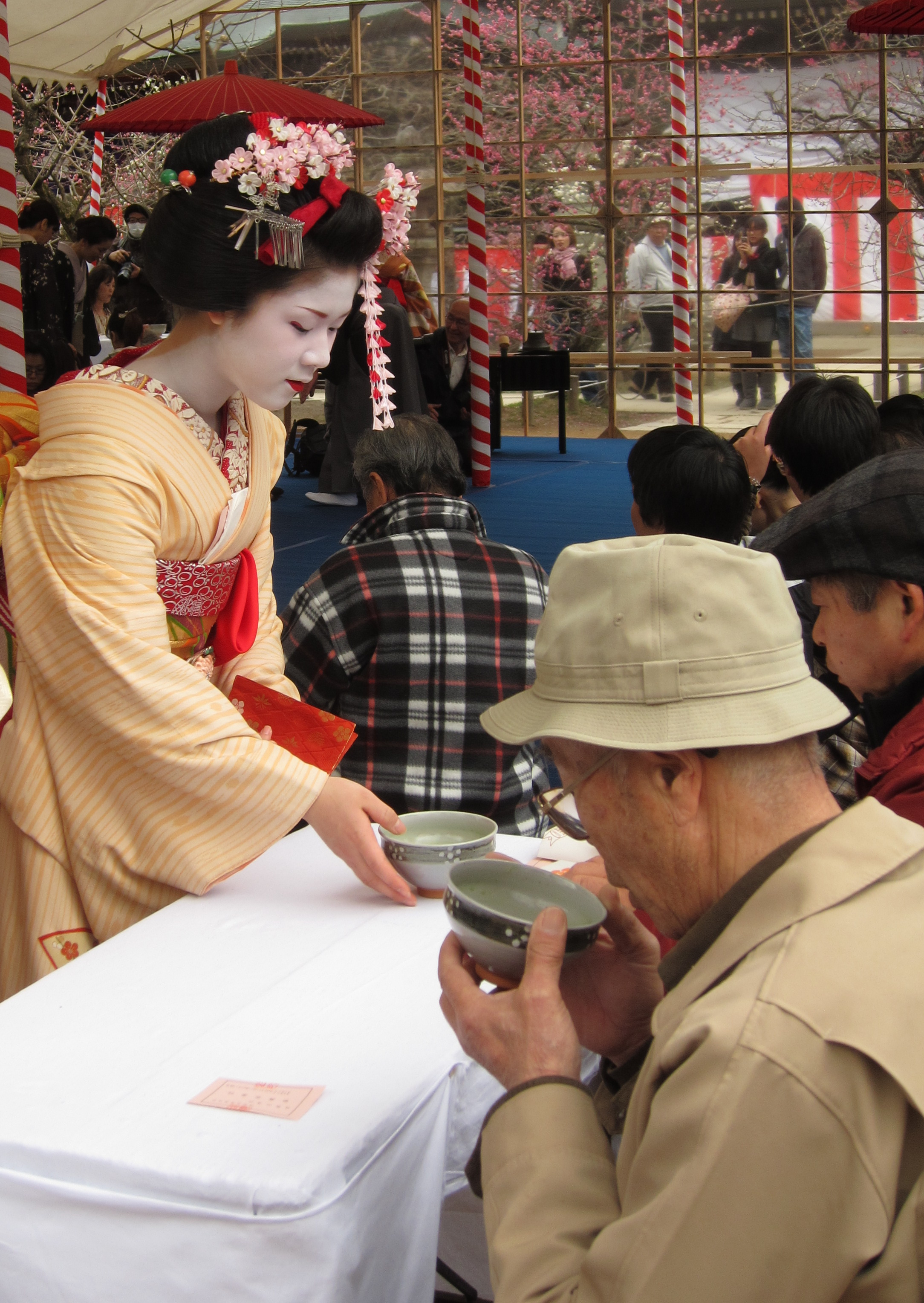
A maiko serving tea at the plum blossom festival.

The grounds are filled with Michizane's favorite tree, the red and white ume or plum blossom, and when they blossom the shrine is often very crowded. The Plum Blossom Festival (梅花祭, baikasai) is held on February 25, coinciding with the monthly market. An open-air tea ceremony (野点, nodate) is hosted by geiko and apprentice maiko from the nearby Kamishichiken district, where tea and wagashi are served to 3,000 guests by geisha and maiko. The plum festival has been held on the same day every year for about 900 years to mark the death of Michizane. The outdoor tea ceremony dates back to 1952. In that year, a big festival was held to mark the 1,050th anniversary of Michizane's death, based on the historic Kitano Ochakai tea ceremony hosted at the shrine by Toyotomi Hideyoshi.

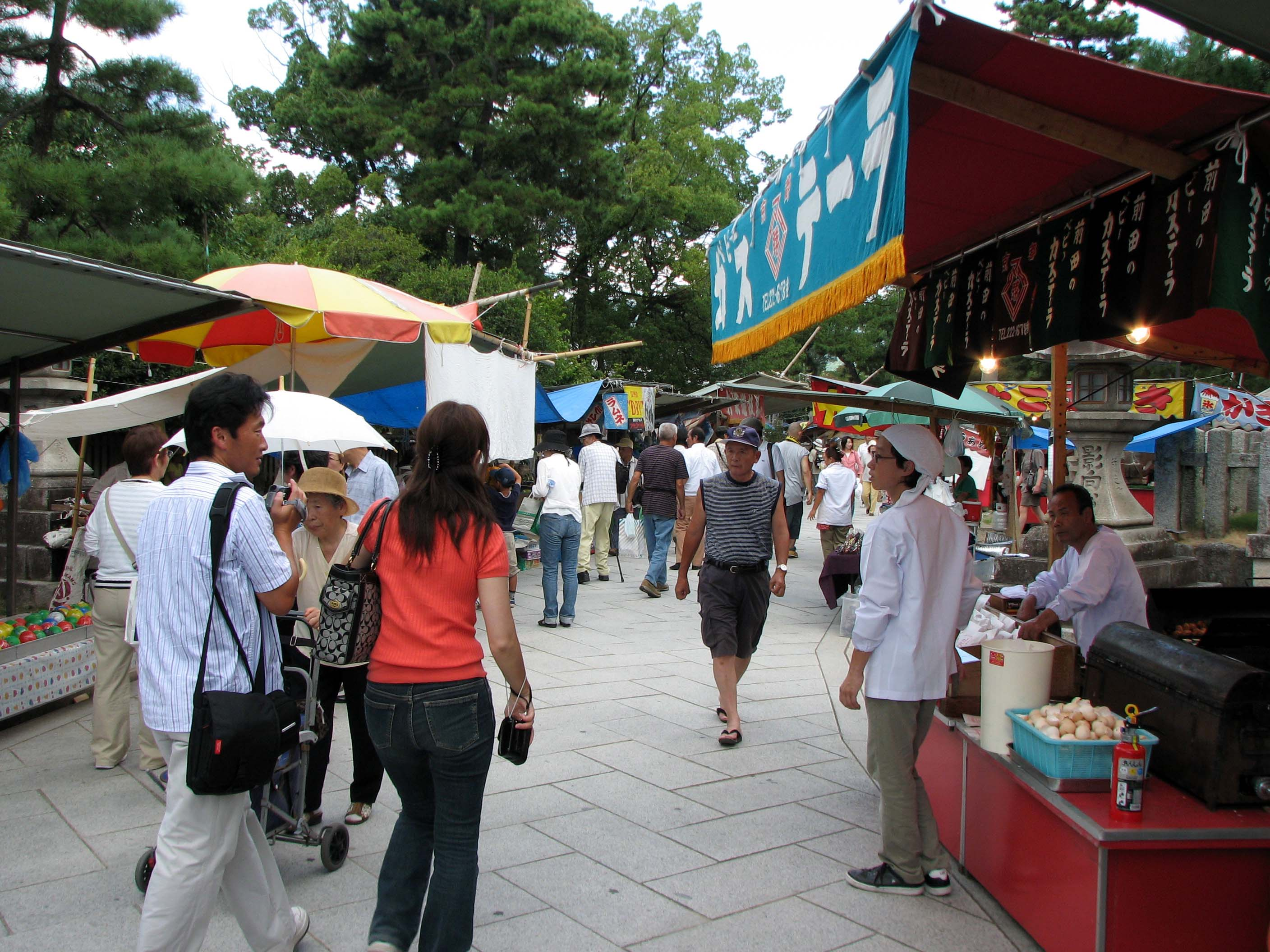
The proverbial flea market at Tenmangū

Kitano Tenmangū is popular with students praying for success in exams because the deity was in his life a man of literature and knowledge. On the 25th of every month, the shrine hosts a flea market. Together with the similar festival at Tō-ji, a temple in the same city, they inspired the Kyoto proverb, "Fair weather at the Tōji market means rainy weather at the Tenjin market," calling to mind Kyoto's fickle weather.

== See also ==
- List of Shinto shrines
- Twenty-Two Shrines
- List of National Treasures of Japan (shrines)
- List of National Treasures of Japan (paintings)
- Modern system of ranked Shinto shrines
- Tenmangū
- Tenjin Matsuri
