= Tenjin (kami) =

Japanese scholarship deity

- Academics, scholarship, learning
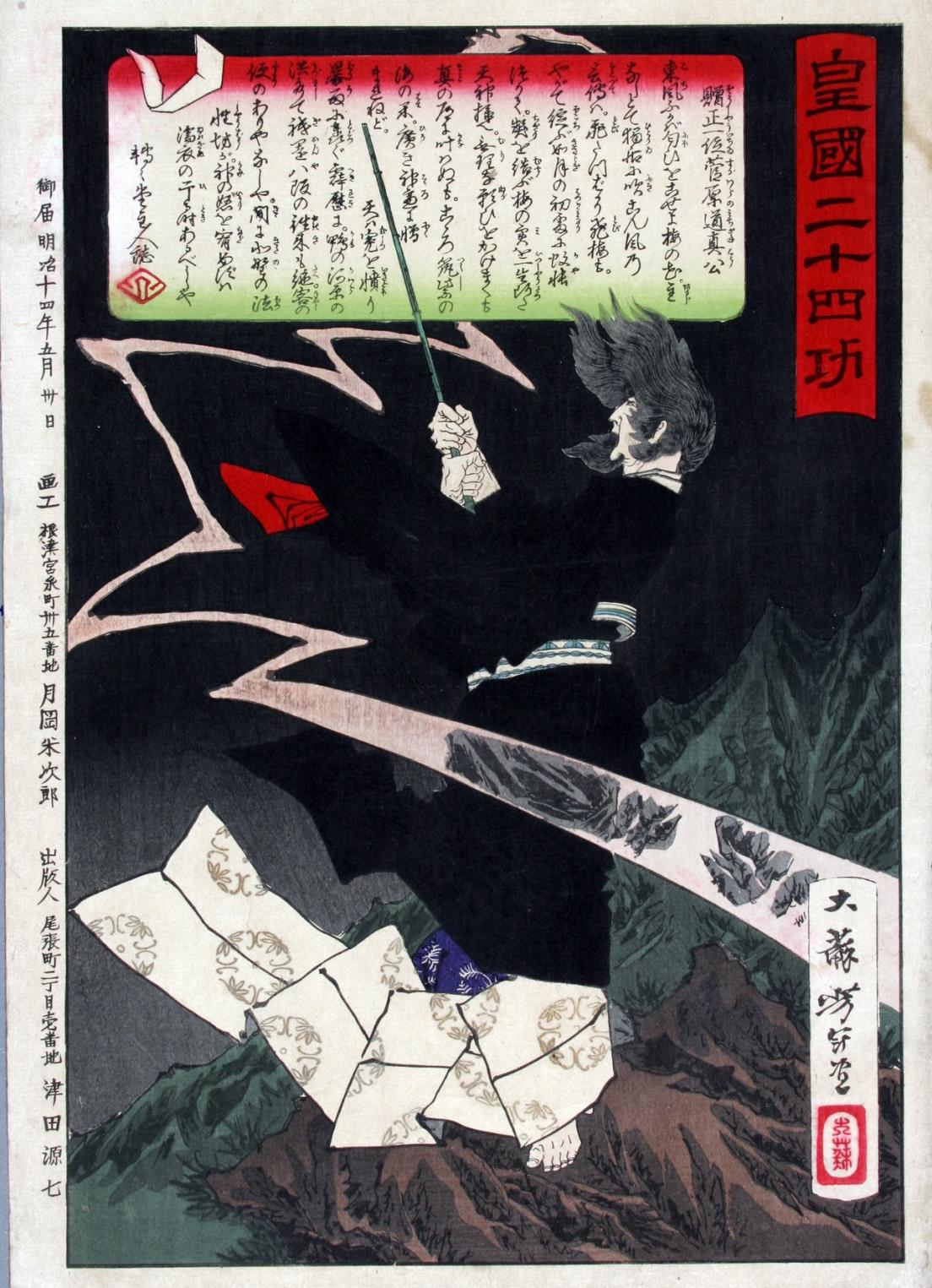
- Ukiyo-e by Tsukioka Yoshitoshi depicting Sugawara no Michizane as the Tenjin (kami of thunder). After Sugawara no Michizane's death, lightning struck the palace, killing and injuring many of the powerful people involved in his banishment, and Sugawara no Michizane was enshrined in the Tenmangū (Shinto shrines) as the Tenjin.
- Other names: Tenjinsama; Sugawara no Michizane
- Affiliation: Shinto
- Animals: Bull
- Age: 58 (845 – 903 AD)
- Tree: Ume
- Gender: Male
- Region: Fukuoka
- Ethnic group: Japanese

In the Shinto religion of Japan, Tenjin (天神), also called Tenman Daijizai Tenjin (天満大自在天神), is the patron kami (deity) of academics, scholarship, of learning, and of the intelligentsia.

Tenjin is the deification of Sugawara no Michizane (845–903), the famous scholar, poet and politician of the Heian period.

Ten (天) means sky or heaven, and jin (神) means god or deity.

== Sugawara no Michizane ==
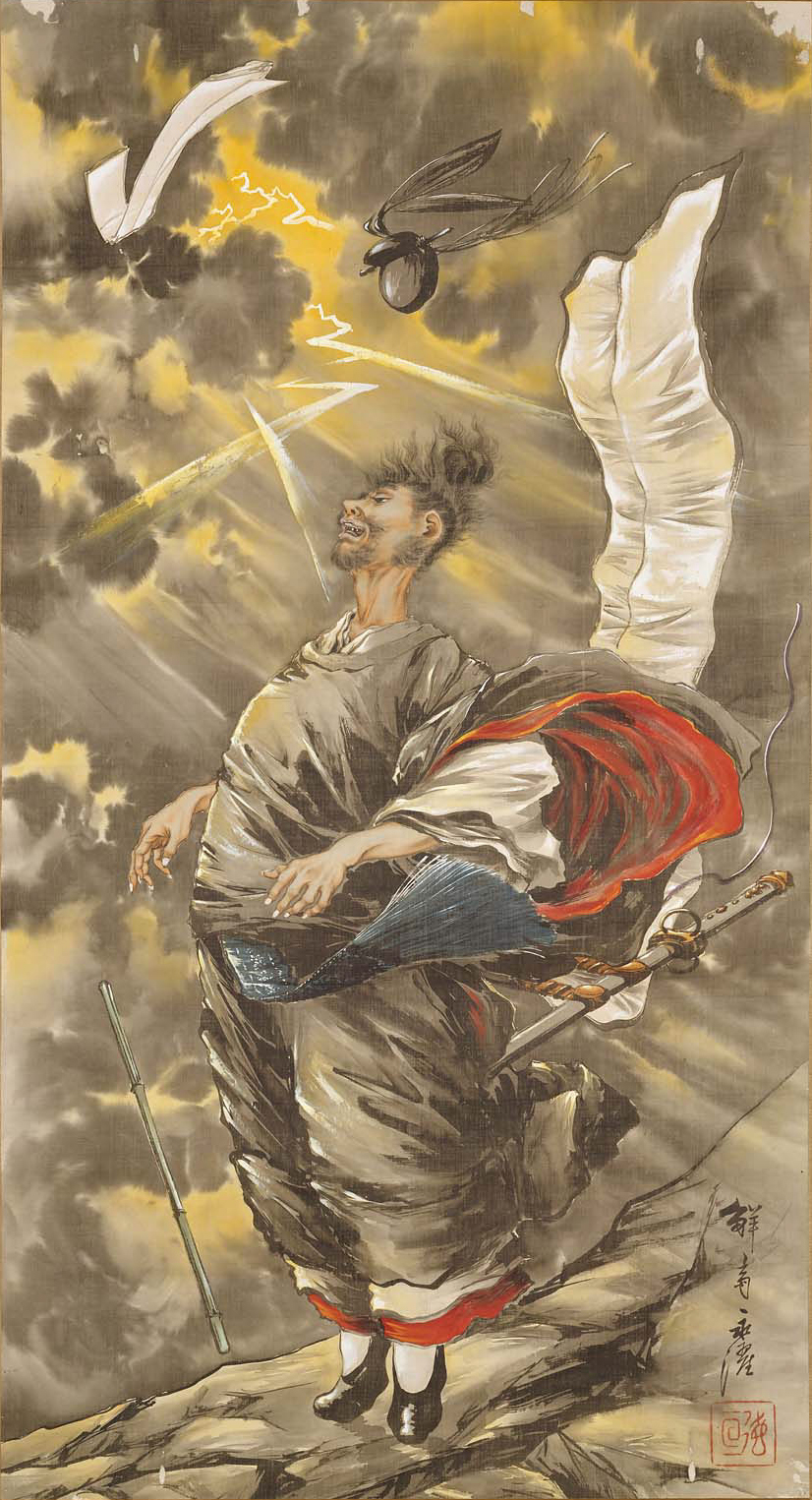
Painting by Kobayashi Eitaku depicting Sugawara no Michizane reborn as the Tenjin

In Japanese history, Sugawara no Michizane rose high in the government of the country in the late 9th century, but at the beginning of the 10th century, he fell victim to the plots of a rival, a member of the Fujiwara clan, and was demoted and exiled to Kyushu. He died in exile in 903. Michizane had been one of the leading scholars and poets of his age, having taken part in revising the Sandai Jitsuroku and the Ruiju Kokushi and authored the Kanke Bunsō; in 901, under Emperor Daigo, he was demoted from Minister of the Right to deputy governor-general at Dazaifu in Kyushu, where he died two years later. In the years that followed, a series of misfortunes struck the capital: the death of Crown Prince Yasuakira in 923 was already widely attributed to Michizane's vengeful spirit (goryō), prompting the court to posthumously restore his offices and rank; the death of Prince Yoshiyori followed in 925. On July 21, 930, the capital city was struck by heavy rain and lightning, and many of the leading Fujiwara died, while fires caused by lightning and floods destroyed many of their residences. The court of the Emperor drew the conclusion that the disturbances were caused by Michizane's onryō (怨霊, vengeful spirit), and, to placate it, the Emperor restored all Michizane's offices, burned the official order of exile, and ordered that the poet be worshiped under the name Tenjin, which means sky deity. The identification of Michizane's spirit with the tenjin grew increasingly widespread through a series of oracular pronouncements (takusen). The resulting cult, Tenjin Shinkō, combined elements of the older tenjin raijin, a thunder and weather deity already venerated before Michizane's death, to whom Emperor Kanmu himself had prayed at Katano, and still worshipped independently of Michizane at the Kita-Shirakawa Gūsha shrine, with Michizane's own goryō and the Buddhist role of gohōjin, protector of the Dharma.A shrine was established at Kitano; it was the first rank of official shrines, supported directly by the government.

== Evolution into the patron of scholars ==
For the first few centuries, then, Tenjin was seen as a god of natural disasters, worshiped to placate him and avoid his curses. However, Michizane was a famous poet and scholar in his lifetime, one of the greatest of the Heian period, and in the Edo period scholars and educators came to regard him as a patron of scholarship. By the present day, this view has completely eclipsed natural disasters in popular worship.

Tenjin's influence is now regarded as particularly strong in passing exams, and so many school students, and their parents, pray for success at his shrine before important entrance exams, and return afterward, if appropriate, to give thanks for success.

== Things related to Tenjin ==
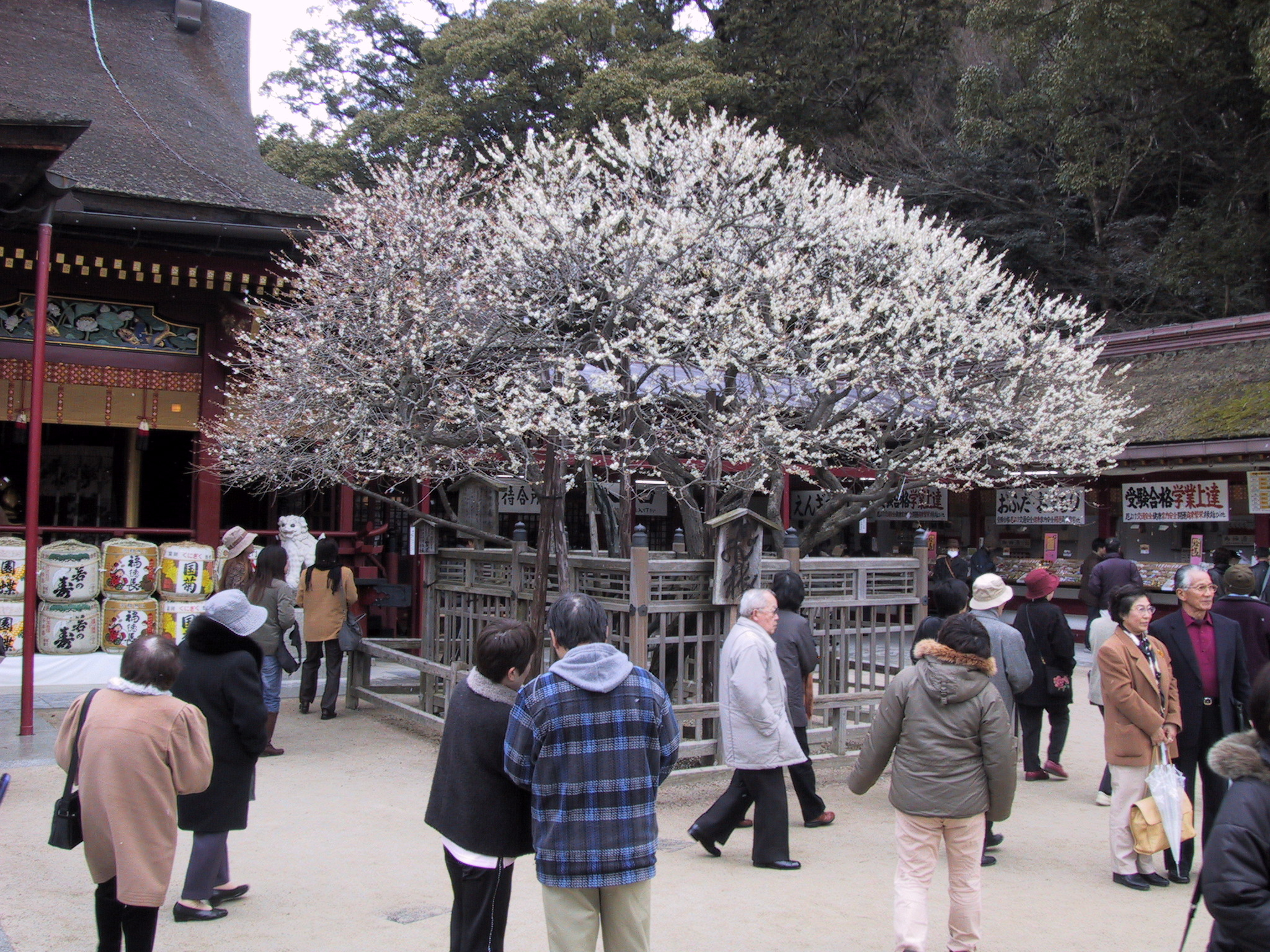
The ume tree that in legend flew to Kyushu to be with Sugawara no Michizane

Michizane was very fond of ume trees, writing a famous poem from exile in which he lamented the absence of a particular tree he had loved in the capital. Legend states that it flew from Kyoto to Dazaifu in Kyushu to be with him, and the tree is still on show at his shrine there. As a result, shrines to Tenjin often are planted with many ume trees. By coincidence, these trees blossom in February, the same time of year as exam results are announced, and so it is common for Tenjin shrines to hold a festival around this time.

The animal particularly associated with Tenjin is the bull because, according to legend, during Michizane's funeral procession, the bull pulling the cart bearing his remains refused to go any further than a certain spot, which was then built up into his shrine.

In addition, the spirit of Sugawara no Michizane was posthumously bestowed the title of "Tenman Daijizai Tenjin", which is said to be a syncretism of the power of the spirit and Daijizai Tenjin.

== Shrines ==
The main shrines to this kami are Kitano Tenman-gū in Kyoto and Dazaifu Tenman-gū in Fukuoka Prefecture, and the top three are rounded out by Egara Tenjin Shrine in Kamakura, but there are many other shrines dedicated to him across Japan. These shrines are called Tenman-gū (天満宮). A group of three notable shrines has been called the Three Great Tenjin Shrines.

== Worship ==
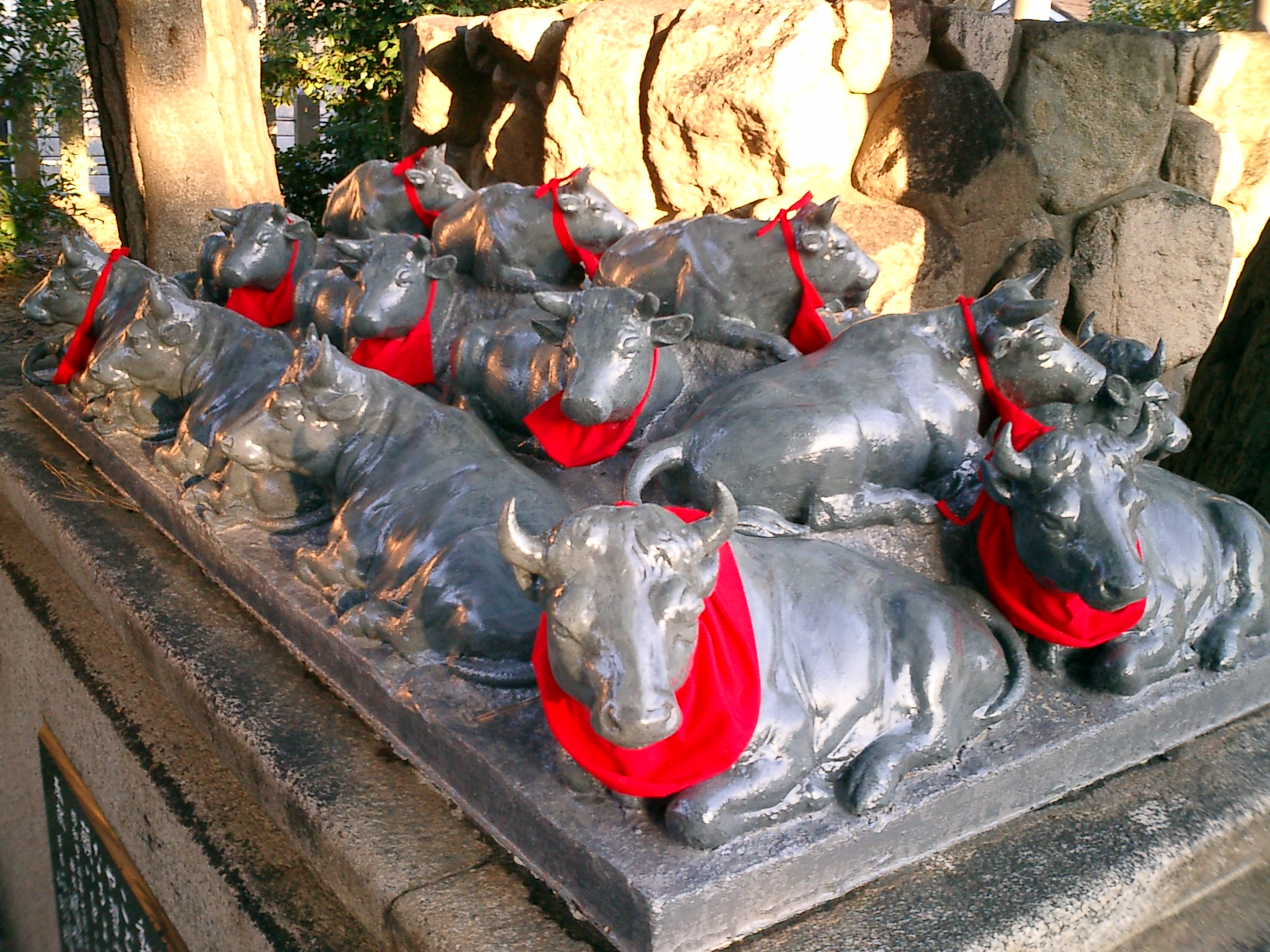
Lying Cow at Tenmangu Shrine (Suma Tsunashiki Tenmangu Shrine, Kobe City)

Sugawara no Michizane is associated with luck in exams.

On February 25, which is Sugawara no Michizane's memorial day, ceremonies are held at temples across Japan. These ceremonies are considered to give benefits for exams.

However, when referring to the shrines as the "Three Great Tenjin Shrines", there are cases where Dazaifu Tenmangu is left out and Kitano Tenmangu is left in.

== See also ==
- Benzaiten, another Japanese patron-kami of intelligentsia (the Japanese name for the Hindu goddess, Saraswati).
- Hitogami
- Maheśvara (Buddhism); one of Maheśvara's Japanese names is Tenman Daijizai Tenjin, which has a connection to Tenjin
- Minamoto no Yoshiie, a samurai who became Hachimantaro, patron ancestral kami of the Minamoto clan
- Omoikane, another Japanese patron-kami of knowledge, music, art, speech, wisdom, learning, and the intelligentsia
- Yoshida Shōin, another deified intellectual
