= Kōnan, Aichi =

Kōnan 江南市
- City
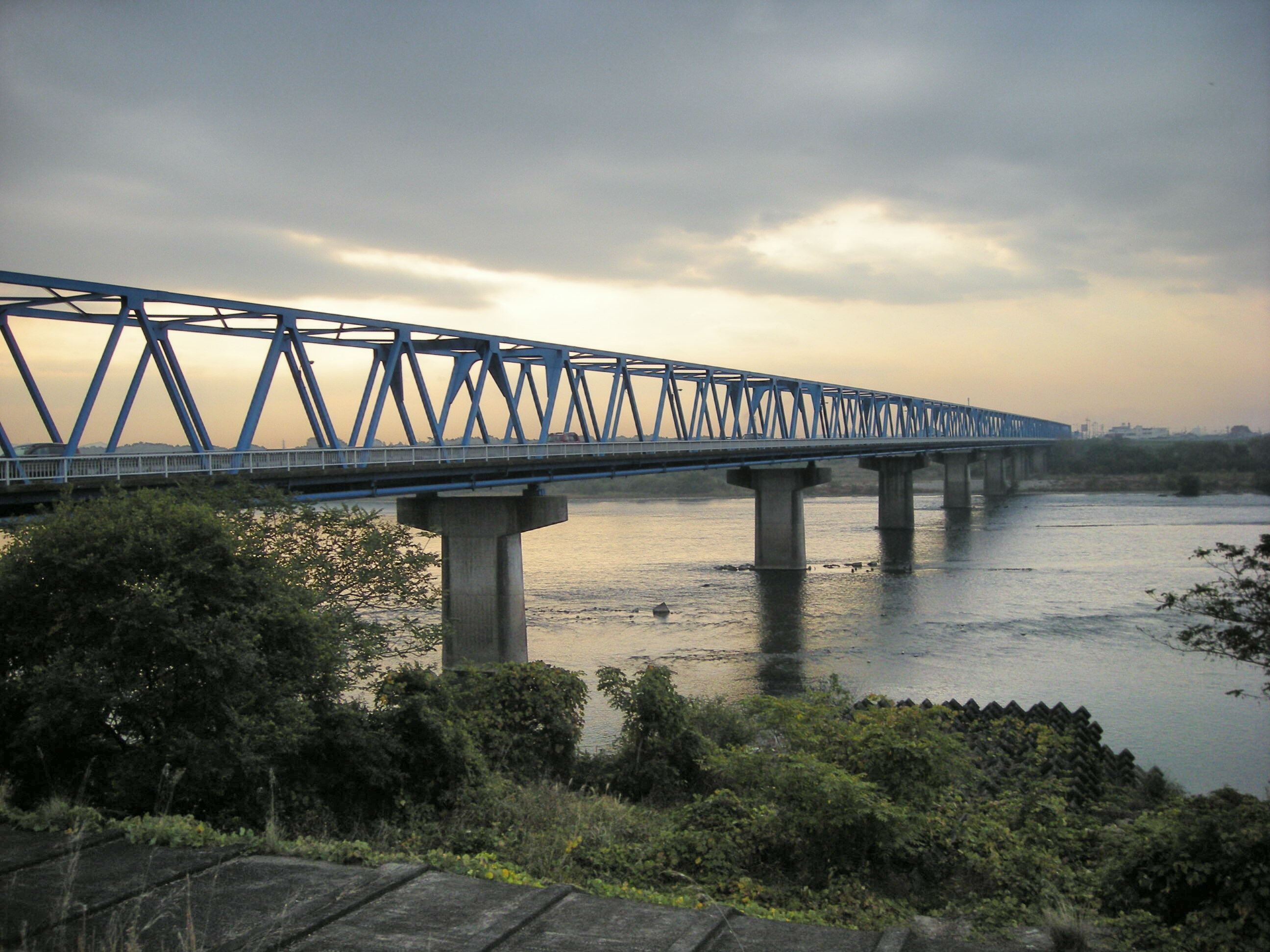
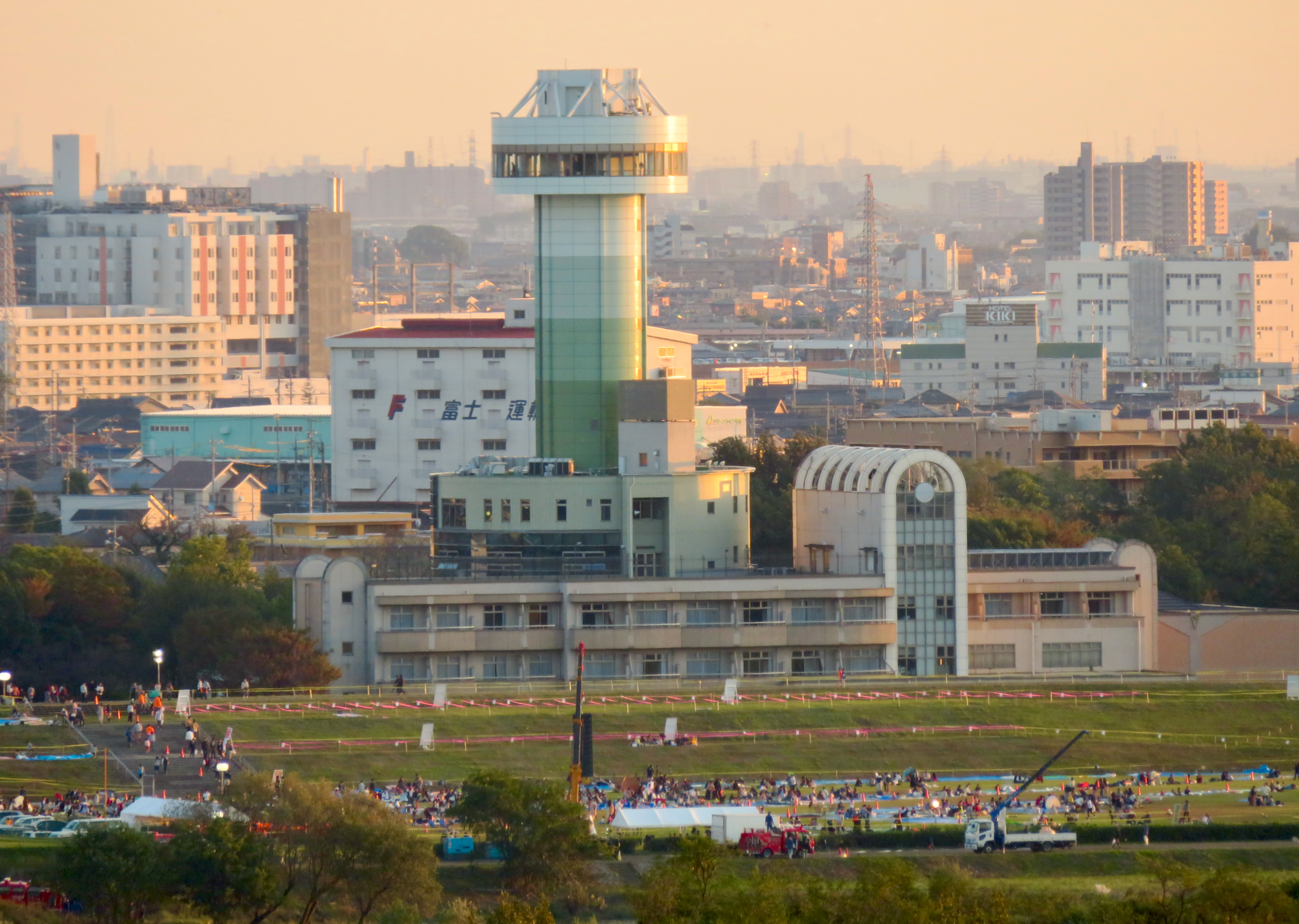
- Upper:Aigi Bridge and Kiso River; Lower:Kōnan Skyline

- Flag Seal

- Location of Kōnan in Aichi Prefecture

- Coordinates: 35°19′55.5″N 136°52′14.4″E
- Country: Japan
- Region: Chūbu (Tōkai)
- Prefecture: Aichi

Government

Area
  - Total: 30.20 km^{2} (11.66 sq mi)

Population (October 1, 2019)
  - Total: 97,903
  - Density: 3,242/km^{2} (8,396/sq mi)
- Time zone: UTC+9 (Japan Standard Time)
- Tree: Round Leaf Holly
- Flower: Wisteria
- Phone number: 0587-54-1111
- Address: 90 Ōbori, Akadouji-machi, Kōnan-shi, Aichi-ken 483-8701
- Website: Official website

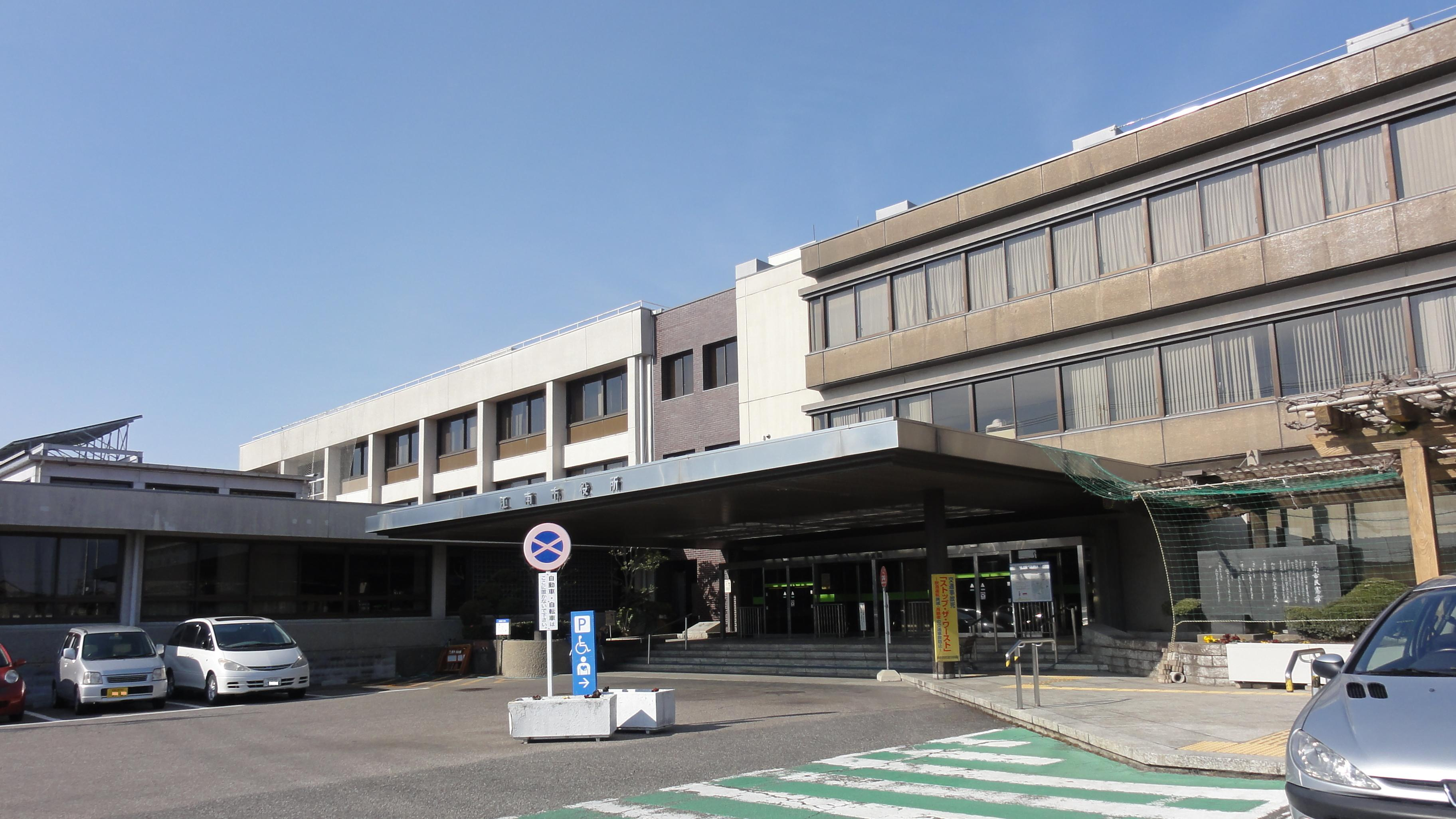
Kōnan city hall

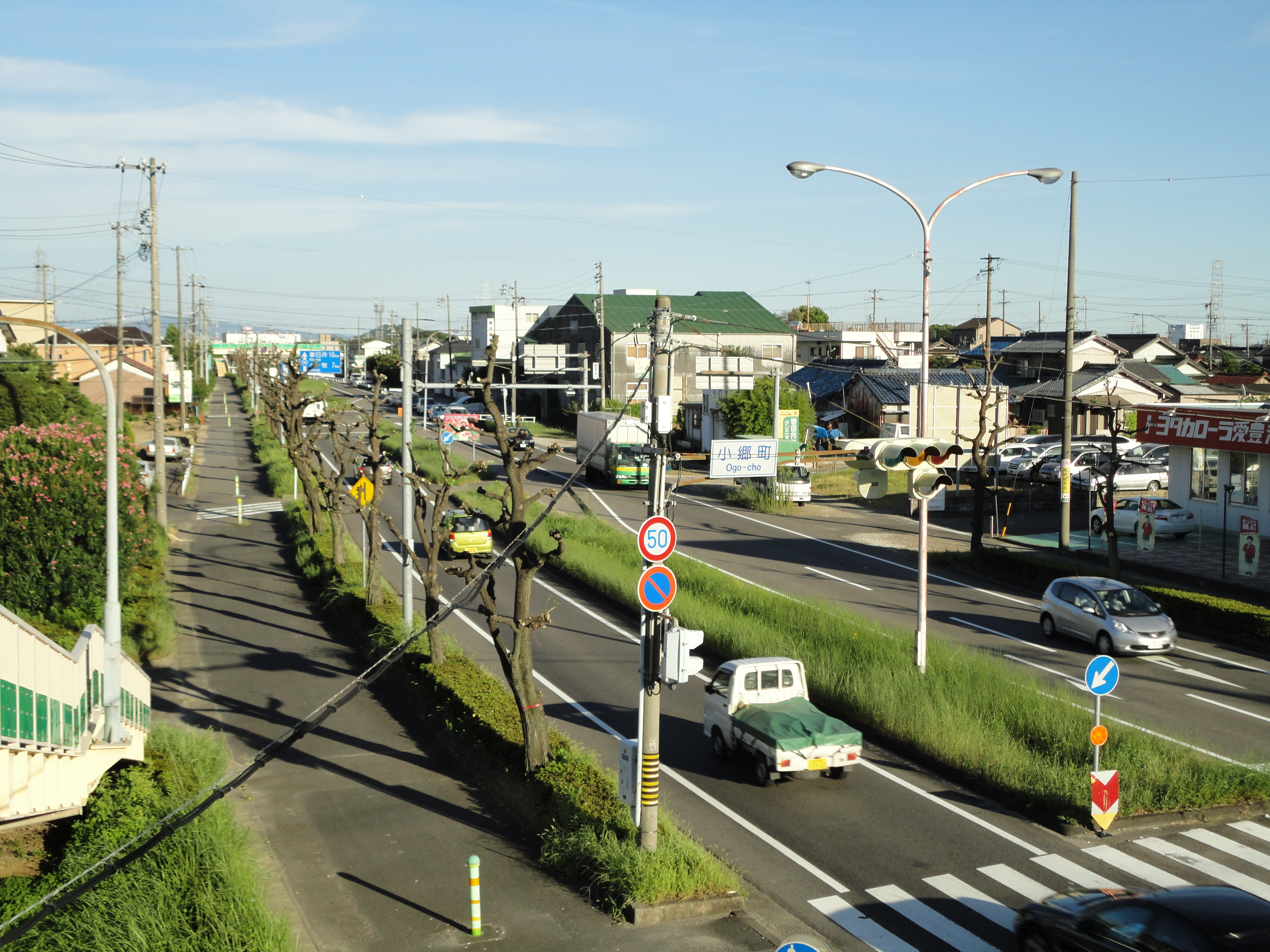
Hotei Town

Kōnan (江南市, Kōnan-shi) is a city located in Aichi Prefecture, Japan. As of 1 October 2019, the city had an estimated population of 97,903 in 41,363 households, and a population density of 3,242 inhabitants per square kilometre (8,400/sq mi). The total area of the city is 30.20 km^{2} (11.66 sq mi).

== Overview ==
The name of the city means "south of the river", referring to the Kiso River.

== Geography ==
Kōnan is located in the northern part of the Nōbi Plain, on the southern bank of the Kiso River. The city extends 6.1 km (3.8 mi) from east to west and 8.8 km (5.5 mi) from north to south. The landform is generally a flat, fertile alluvial fan. Located approximately 20 km (12 mi) from the Nagoya metropolis, it is also a traffic node bordering Gifu Prefecture.

=== Climate ===
The city has a climate characterized by hot and humid summers, and relatively mild winters (Köppen climate classification Cfa). The average annual temperature in Kōnan is 15.7 °C (60.3 °F). The average annual rainfall is 1,845 mm (72.6 in) with September as the wettest month. The temperatures are highest on average in August, at around 28.0 °C (82.4 °F), and lowest in January, at around 4.2 °C (39.6 °F).

=== Demographics ===
Per Japanese census data, the population of Kōnan has increased steadily over the past 70 years.

Historical population
Year	Pop.	±%
1940	33,664	—
1950	42,836	+27.2%
1960	49,278	+15.0%
1970	77,996	+58.3%
1980	92,141	+18.1%
1990	93,837	+1.8%
2000	97,923	+4.4%
2010	99,731	+1.8%

=== Surrounding municipalities ===
Aichi Prefecture

- Fusō
- Ichinomiya
- Iwakura
- Komaki
- Ōguchi

Gifu Prefecture

- Kakamigahara

== History ==
The area of Kōnan is located in ancient Owari Province and was largely part of the holdings of Owari Domain under the Edo period Tokugawa Shogunate. After the establishment of the modern municipalities system in the early Meiji period, the area was organized into villages within Niwa District, Aichi Prefecture. The area was noted for sericulture during this period. The village of Koori became the town of Hotei on November 26, 1894. Hotei and the town of Kochino, together with the town of Miyata and village of Kusai (both from Haguri District) merged on June 1, 1954, to form the city of Kōnan.

== Government ==
Kōnan has a mayor-council form of government with a directly elected mayor and a unicameral city legislature of 22 members. The city contributes one member to the Aichi Prefectural Assembly. In terms of national politics, the city is part of Aichi District 10 of the lower house of the Diet of Japan.

== Economy ==
Kōnan is a local commercial center and a center for transshipment and light manufacturing. Due to its proximity to the Nagoya metropolis, it is increasing becoming a commuter community

Shopping mall

- VIA MALL Kounan
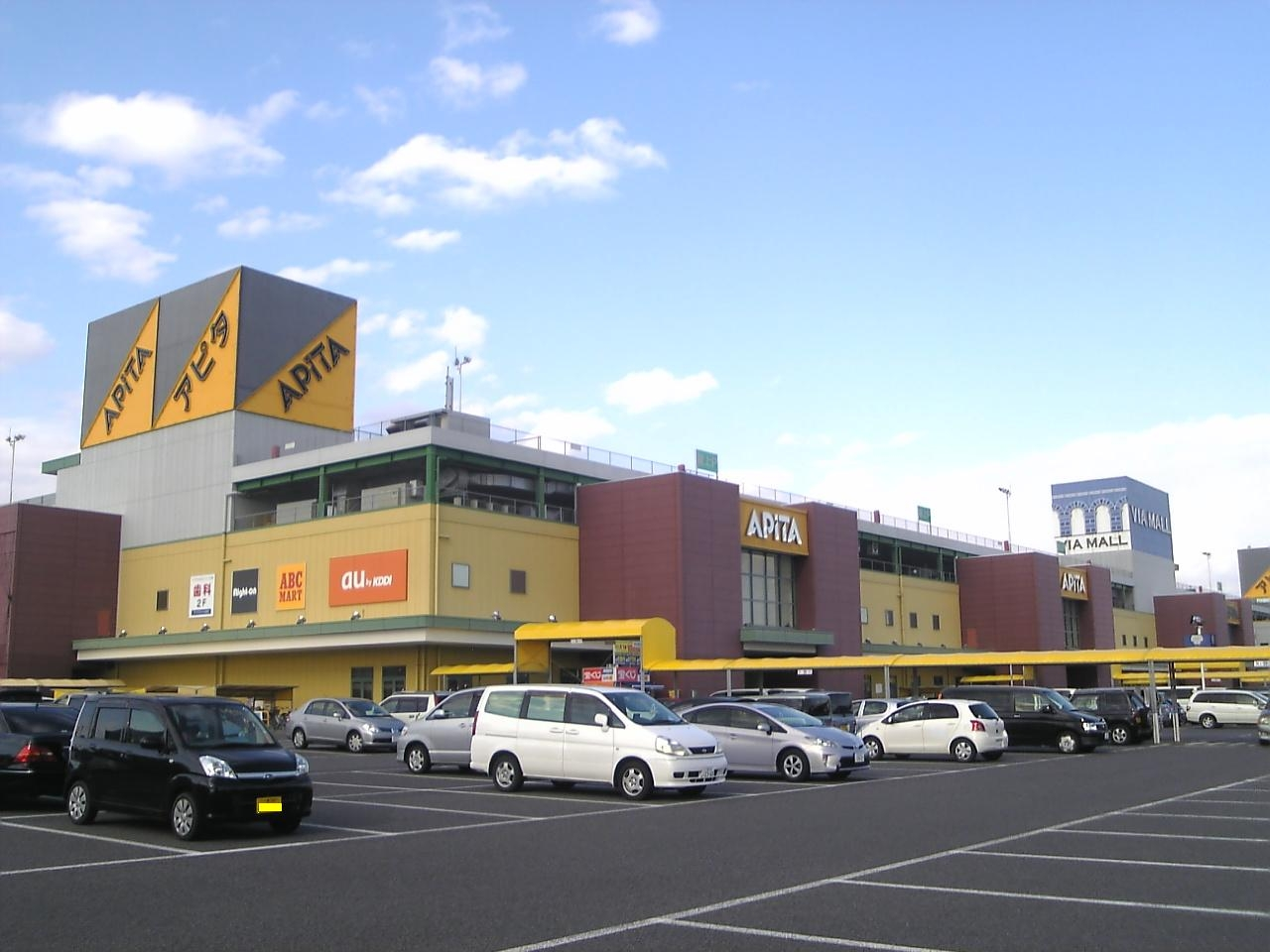
VIA MALL Kounan

== Education ==
Kōnan has ten public elementary schools and five public junior high schools operated by the city government, and three public high schools operated by the Aichi Prefectural Board of Education. There is also one private junior high school and one private high school. The Aichi Konan College, a two-year junior college is also located in Kōnan.

== Transportation ==
=== Railways ===
==== Conventional lines ====
Meitetsu

- Inuyama Line：- Kōnan – Hotei -

=== Roads ===
==== Japan National Route ====
- National Route 155
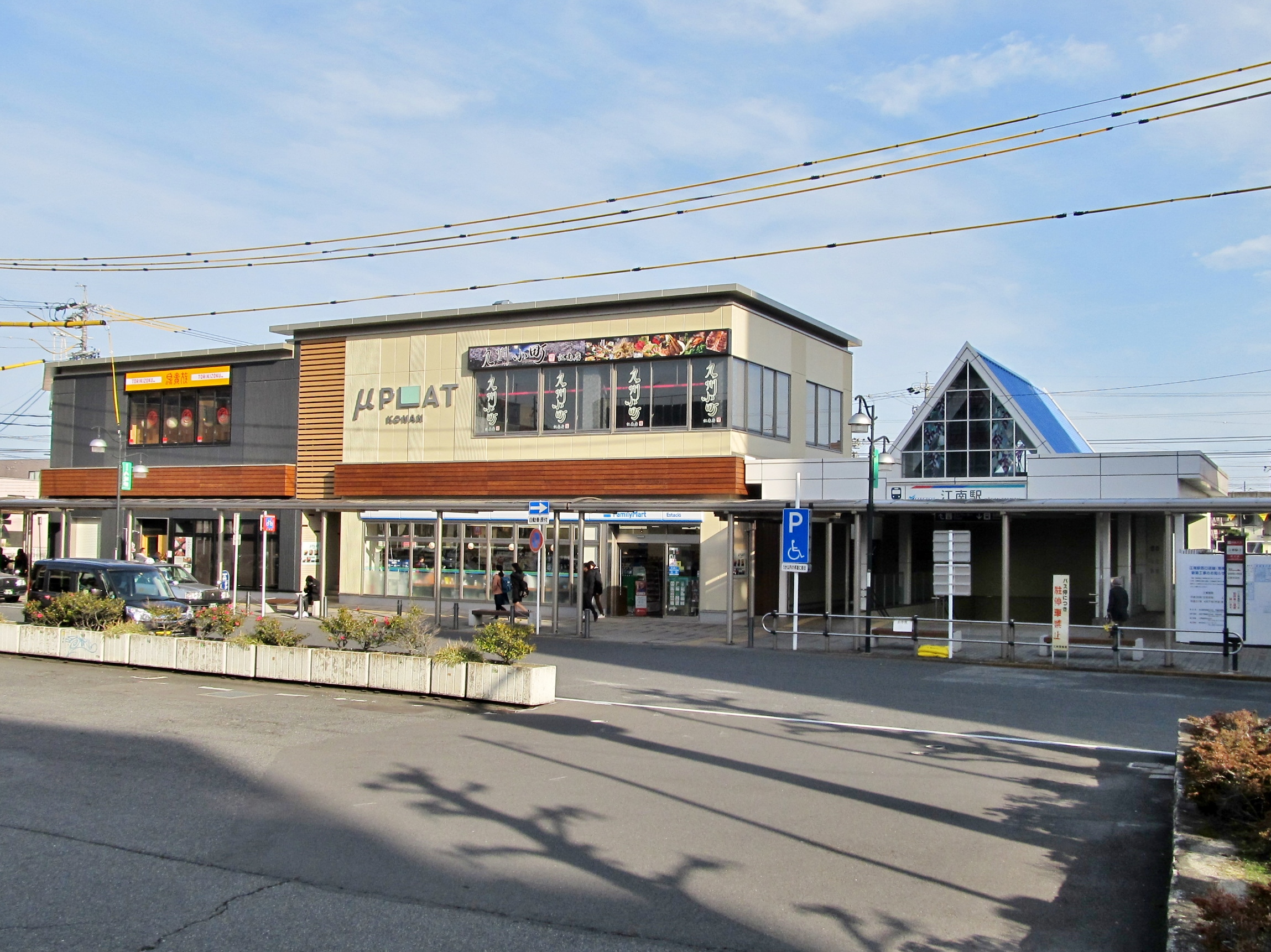
Kōnan Station

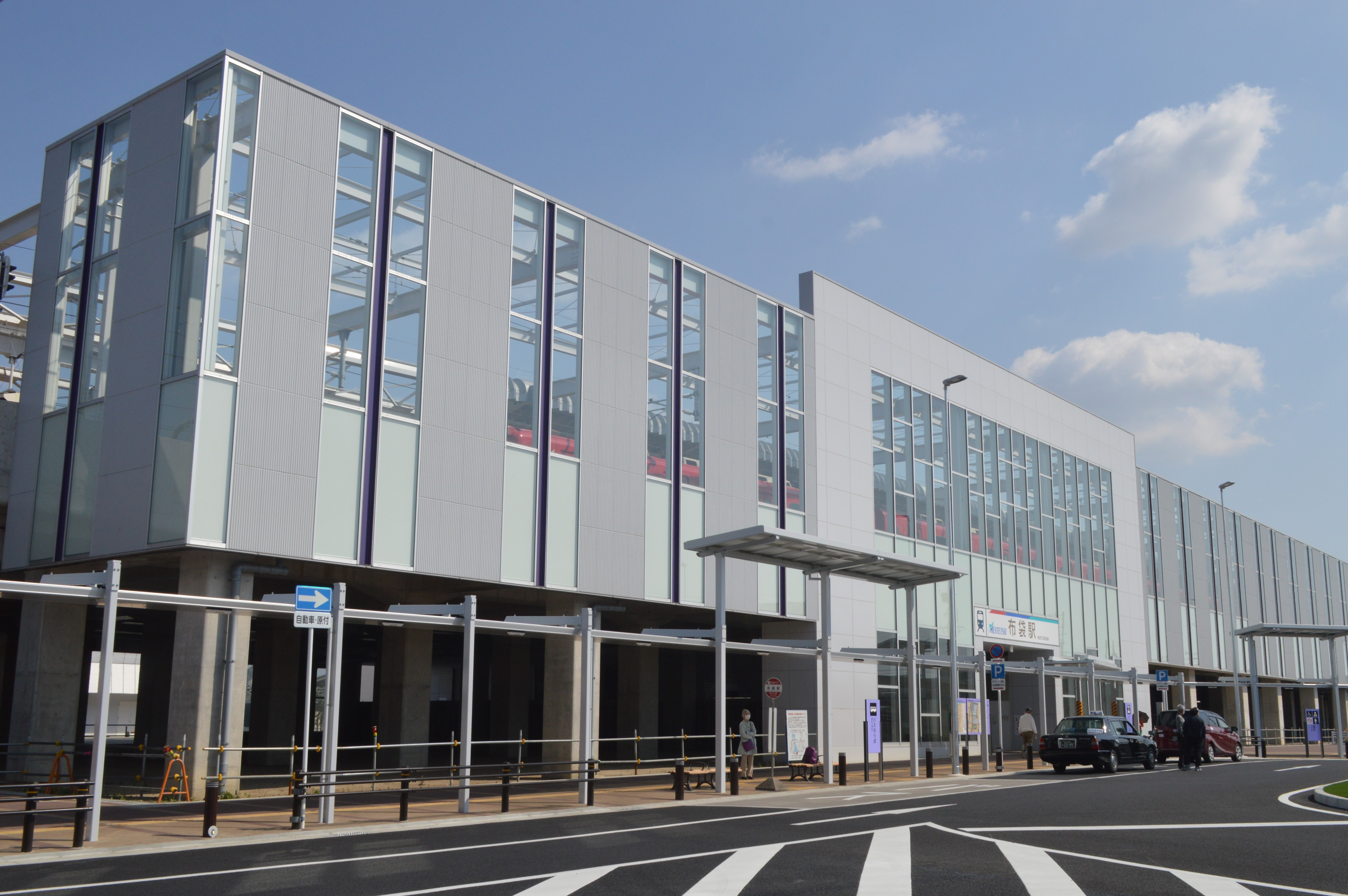
Hotei Station

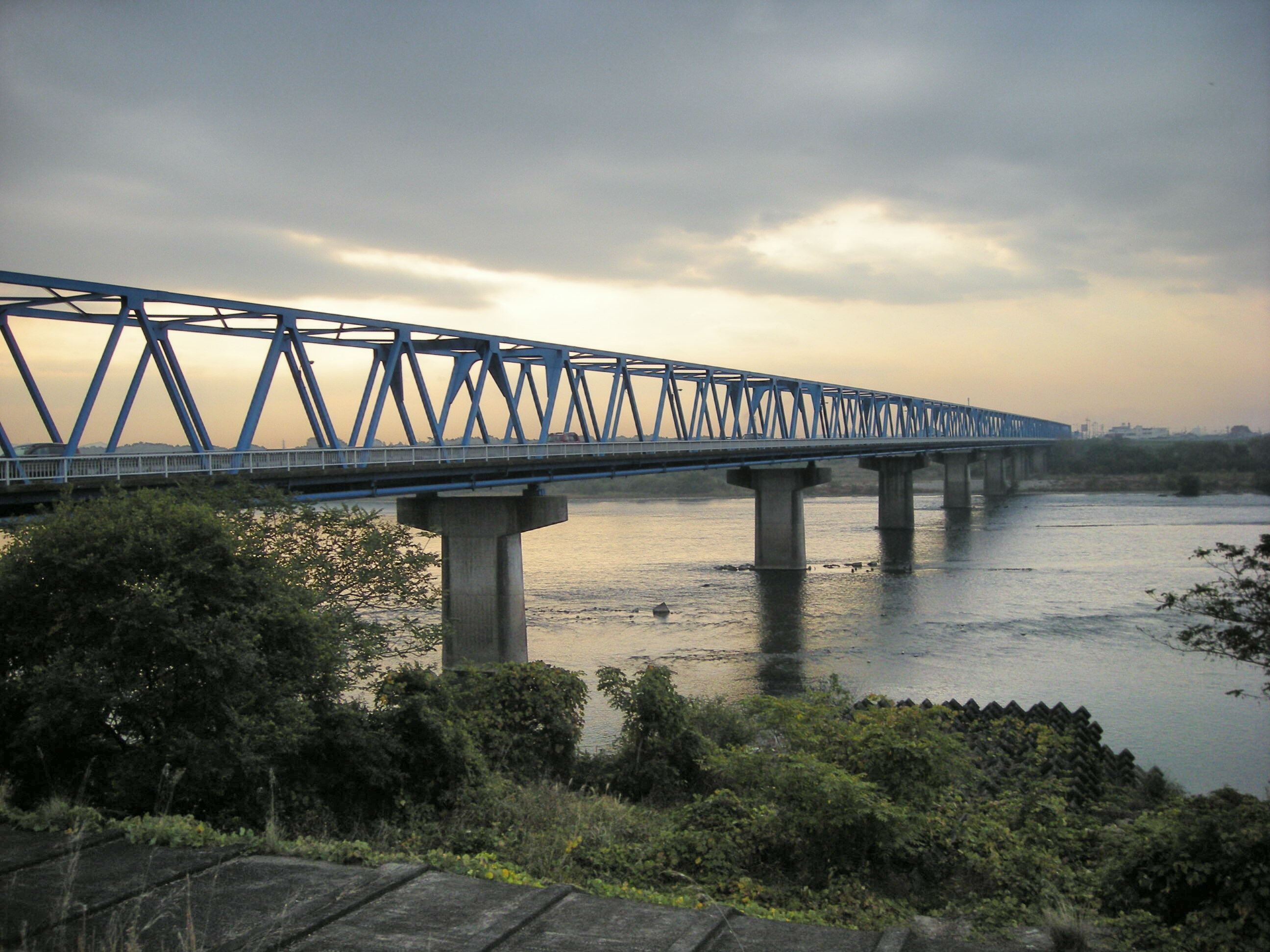
Aigi Bridge

== Local attractions ==
Park

- Flower Park Konan
- Suitopia Konan
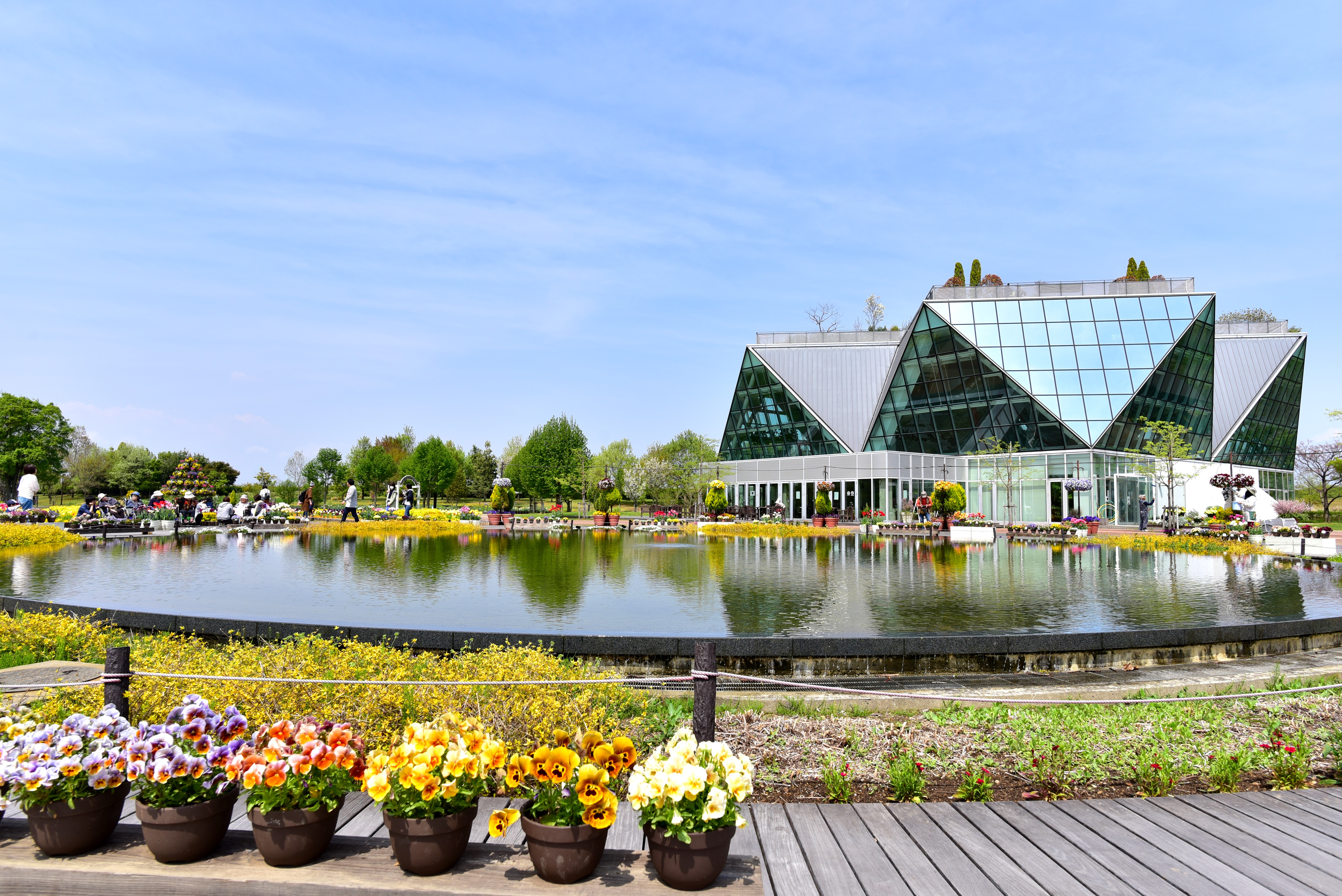
Flower Park Konan

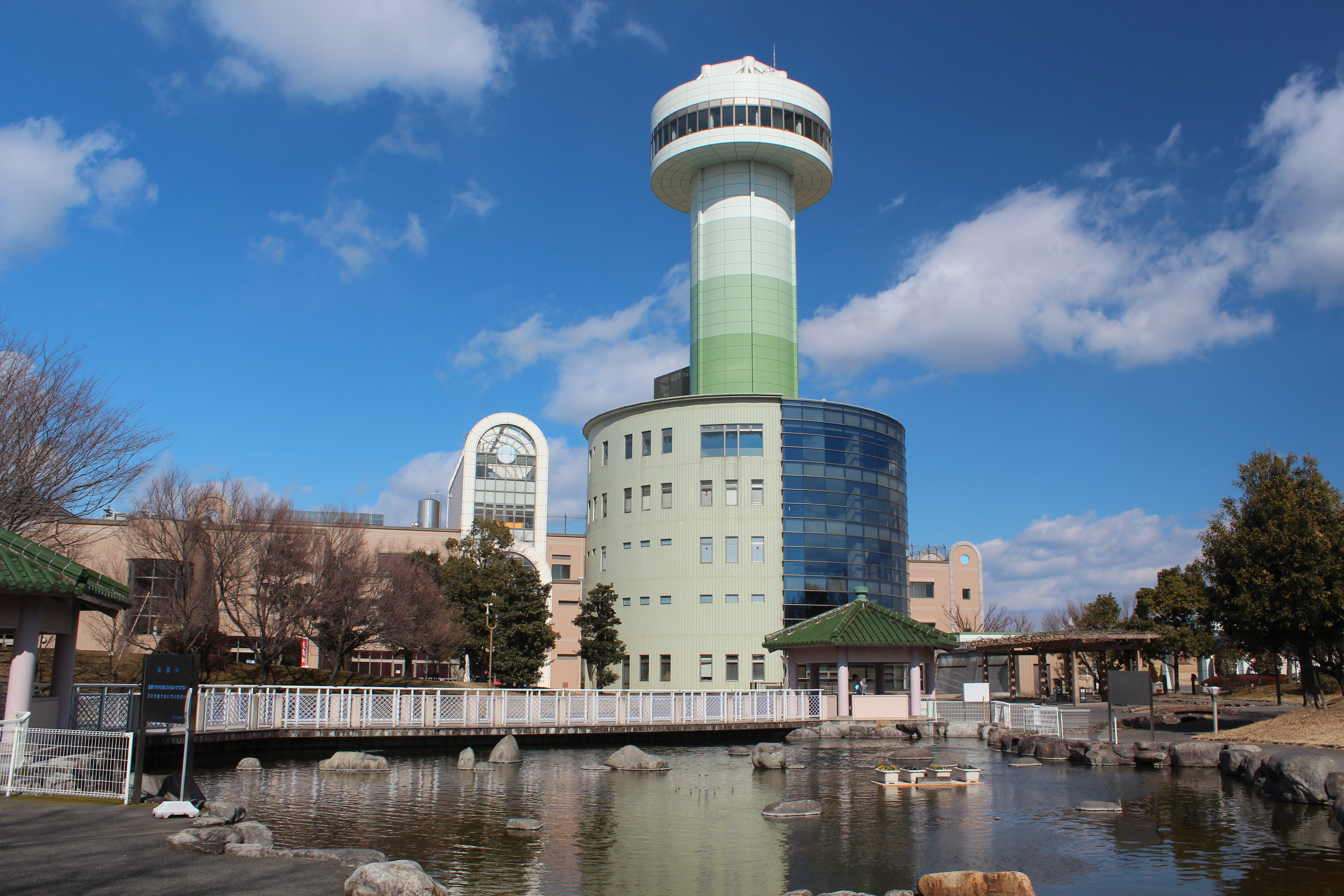
Suitopia Konan

Historic site

- Aigi Bridge
- Hotei Daibutsu
- Kannon-ji temple - bodaiji of Maeno Nagayasu
- Koori Castle
- Mandaradera-ji temple
- Somoto Futagoyama kofun
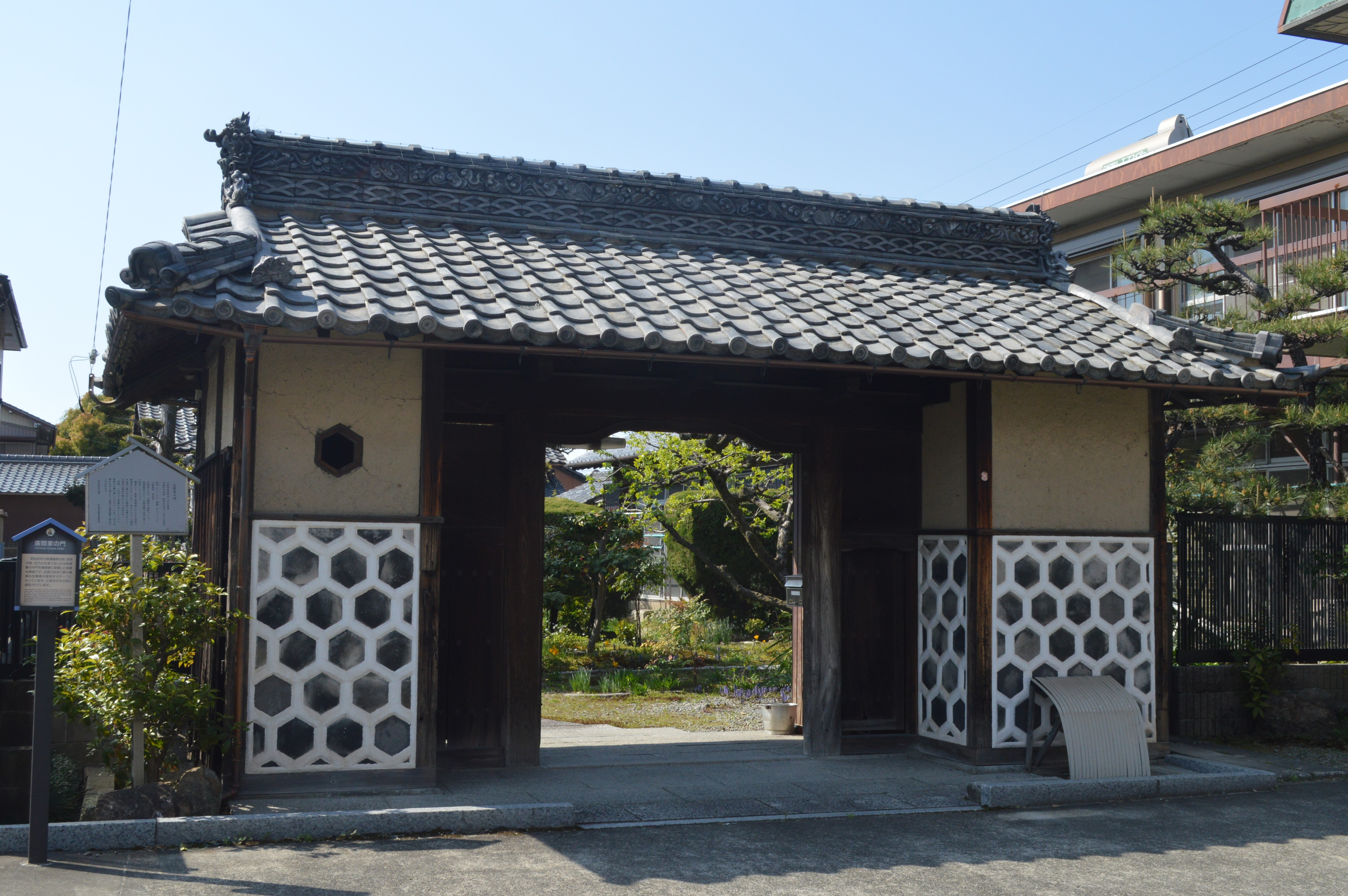
Koori Castle

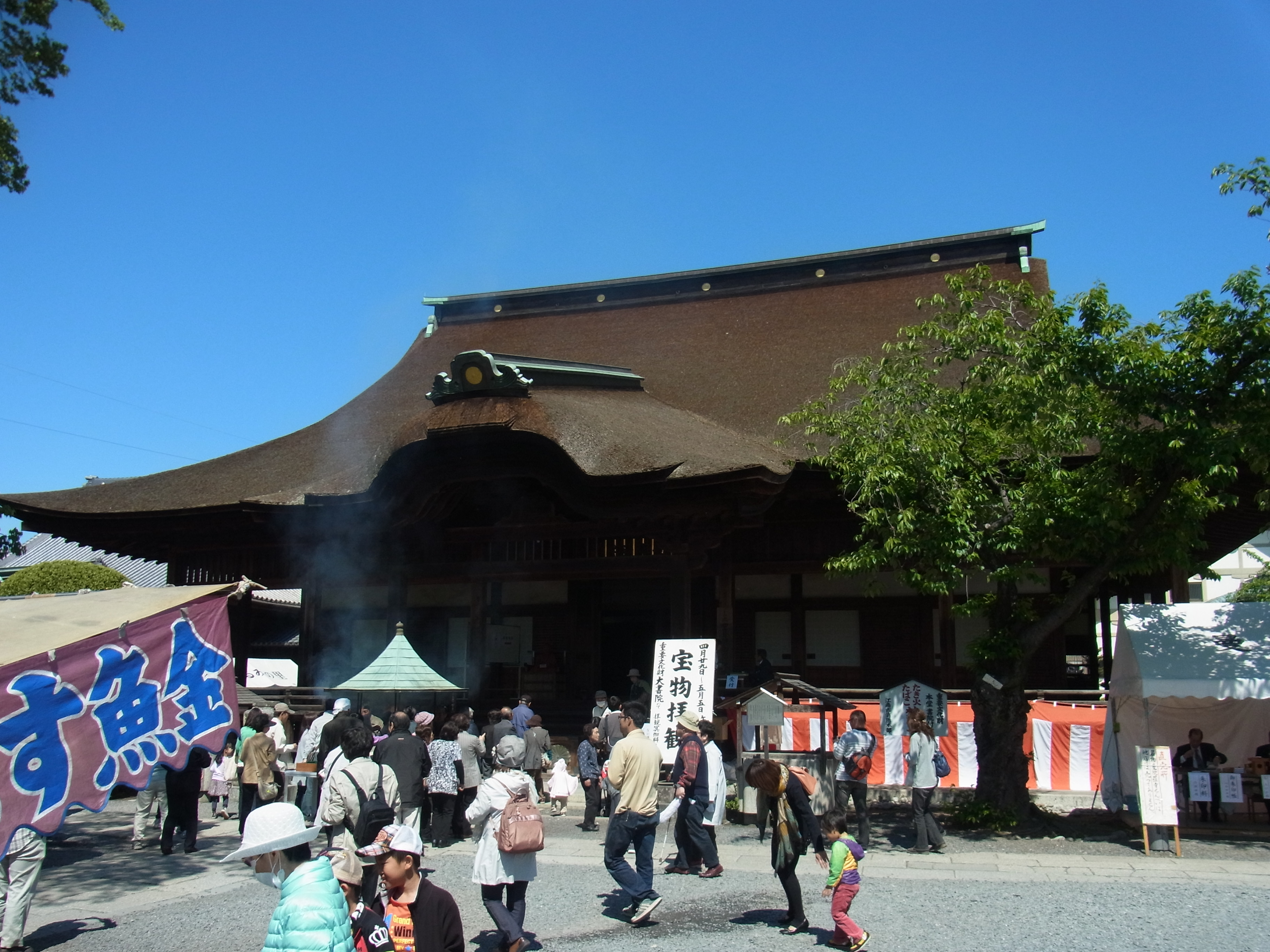
Mandaradera-ji

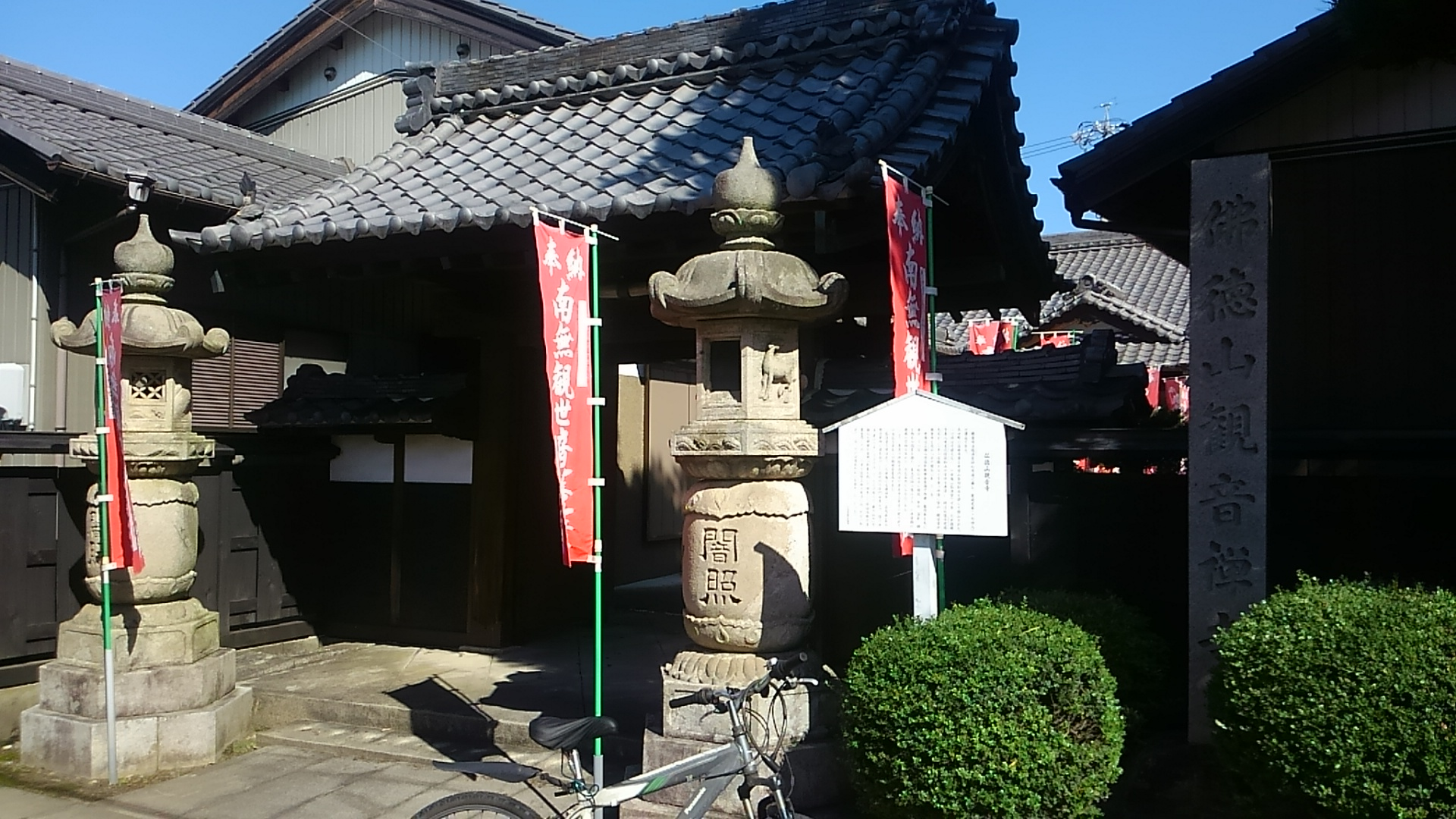
Kannon-ji

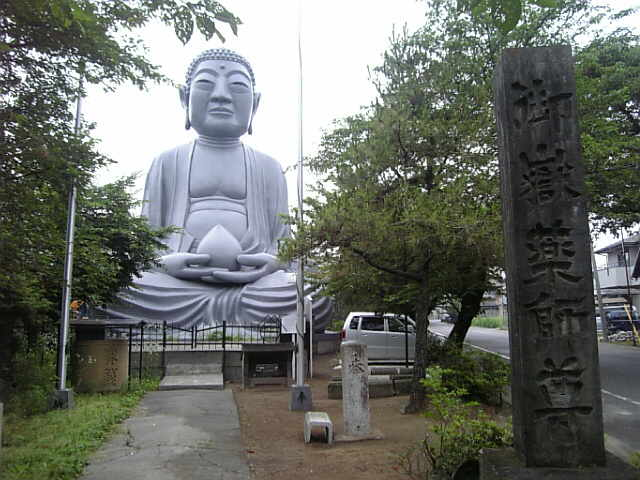
Hotei Daibutsu

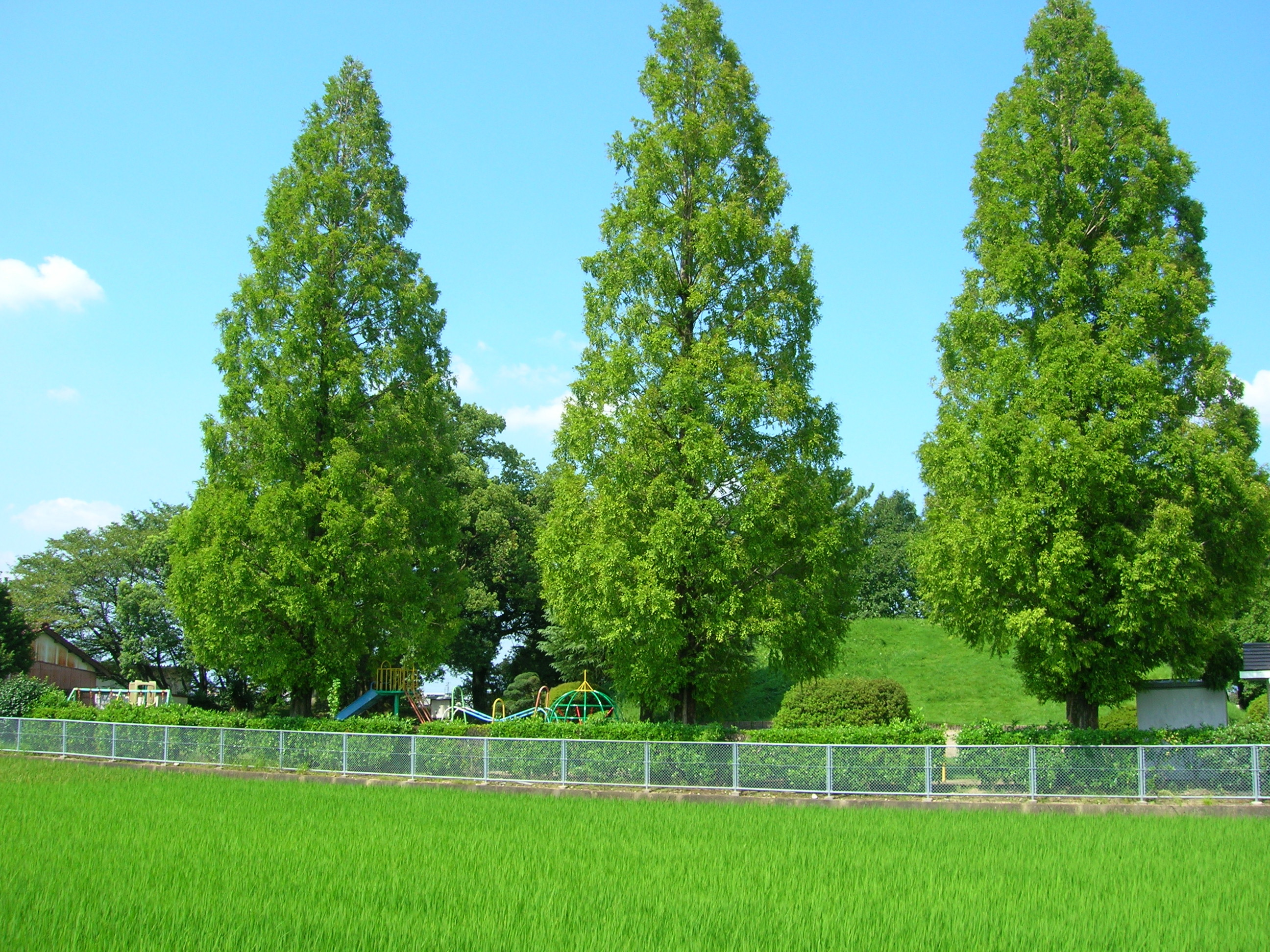
Somoto Futagoyama kofun

== Culture ==
=== Festival ===
- Fuji Matsuri
- Kitano Tenjin Festival
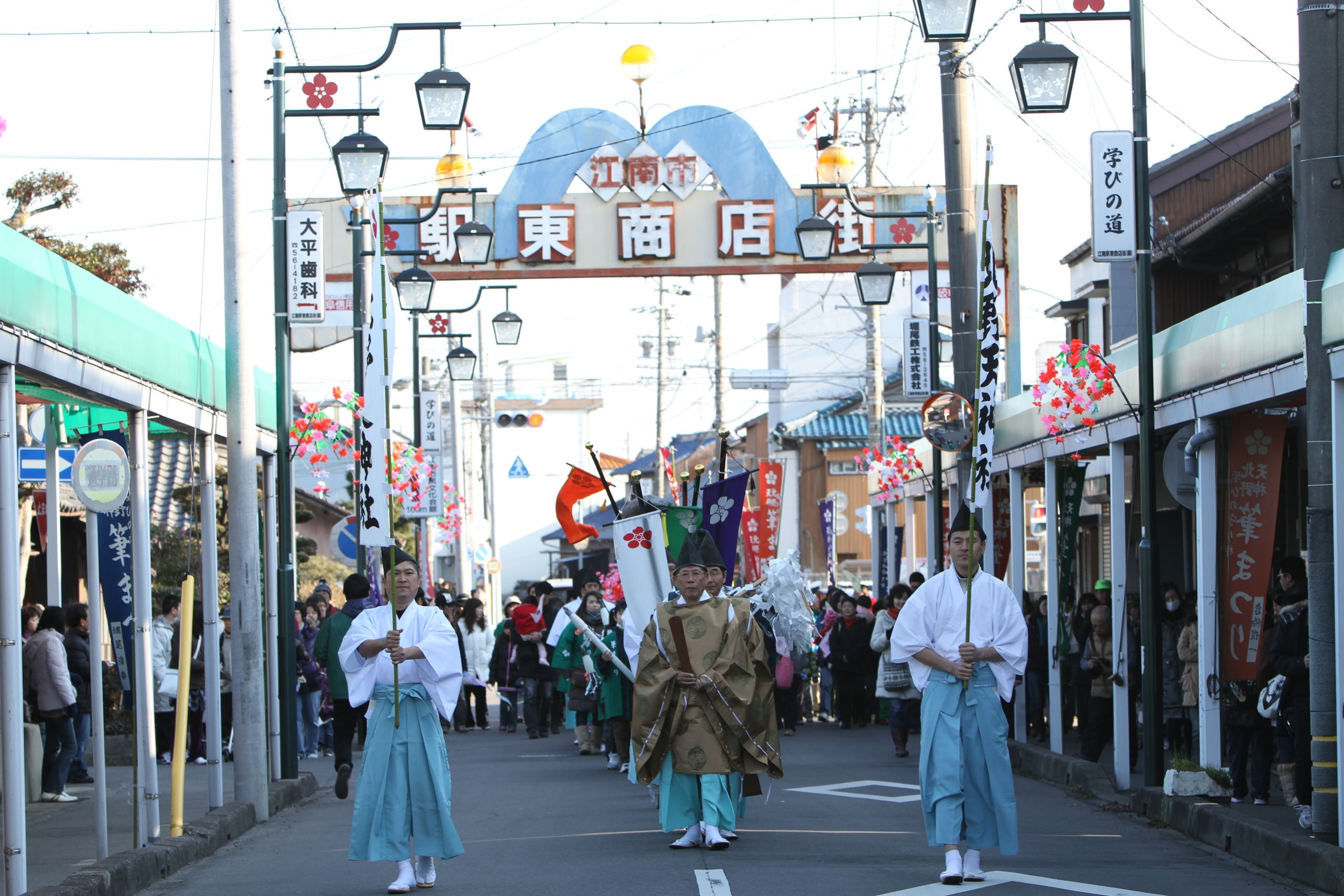
Kitano Tenjin Festival

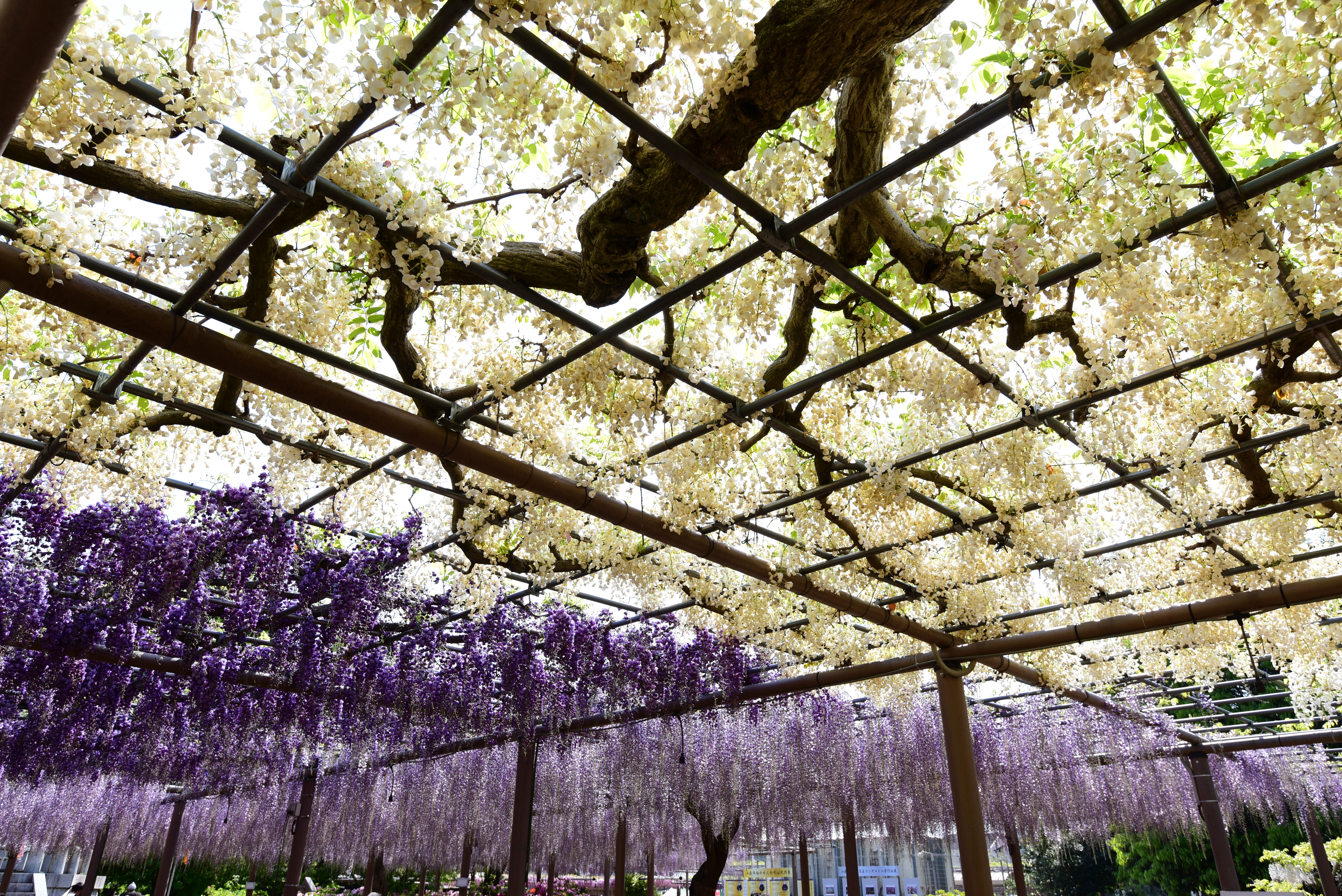
Fuji Matsuri]

== Notable people from Kōnan ==
- Kenji Horikawa, anime producer
- Yukari Nakano, figure skater
- Seira Nakayama, Japanese sabre fencer
- Haruna Ono, musician, frontwoman of SCANDAL
- Ryohei Oiwa, professional wrestler
