= Kameido Tenjin Shrine =

Shinto shrine in Koto Ward, Tokyo, Japan

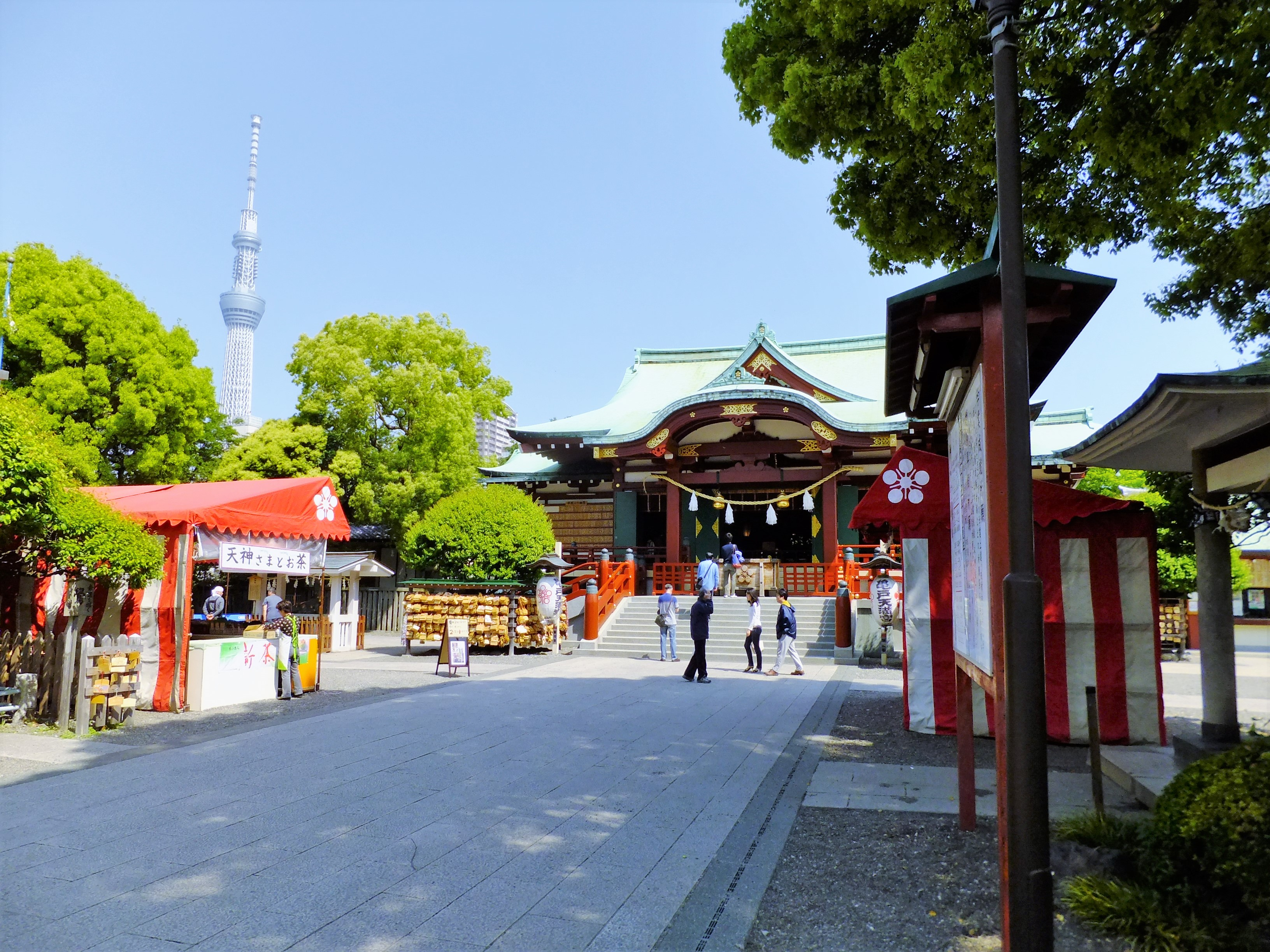
- Kameido Tenjin Shrine in Tokyo, with the Tokyo Skytree in the background

- Location within Japan

Religion
- Affiliation: Shinto

Location
- Location: 3-6-1 Kameido, Koto-ku, Tokyo
- Interactive map of Kameido Tenjin Shrine
- Coordinates: 35°42′11″N 139°49′14″E

Architecture
- Established: 1646
- Destroyed: 1945, later rebuilt

Kameido Tenjin Shrine is a Japanese Tenman-gu shrine located in Kameido, Koto Ward, Tokyo. The shrine is dedicated to Sugawara no Michizane, a 9th-century Japanese scholar.

== Description ==
The Kameido shrine was built in honor of Sugawara no Michizane, a prominent Japanese politician and scholar. Despite a long and successful career serving multiple Japanese emperors, Michizane was eventually demoted from his position in the imperial court by the political machinations of Fujiwara no Tokihira. Upon Michizane's death several years later, a series of natural disasters struck Japan; some attributed these events to the ghost of Michizane. To placate the departed scholar's spirit, a number of shrines were built (including one in Kyoto, then the imperial capital) in his honor, with many shrines portraying Michizane as a kami; even after the disasters subsided, this tradition of honoring Michizane's skill continued and many more shrines were built in his name.

The Kameido Tenjin Shrine was built in Tokyo in 1646. Tokyo was at time a port city of some importance, but was not yet the capital of Japan. Regardless, many people from Tokyo paid homage to Michizane at the shrine between 1646 and 1945. The original Kameido shrine, built out of wood, was destroyed during World War II when the United States Air Force conducted a firebombing campaign against Tokyo; these bombings resulted in the destruction of large parts of the city. In the years after the war, the shrine was rebuilt with more modern materials, such as concrete. The restored shrine is famous for a number of its prominent features; the shrine's grounds contain a number of ponds bridged by drum bridges, and compound also has an abundance of plum trees.

Every year on 25 January, the custodians of the shrine present a carved good luck charm to a visitor. Between April and May, the Fuji Matsuri festival is held at the shrine. The festival entails the celebration of flowers, namely the-then in bloom Wisteria.

== Drum Bridges – Male Bridge and Female Bridge ==
The Male Bridge is the first bridge encountered after passing through the main torii gate. It was constructed in imitation of Dazaifu Tenmangu Shrine. The Female Bridge is located in front of the main shrine building. This bridge represents a hopeful future.The drum bridges of the shrine were depicted by Utagawa Hiroshige and published as “Kameido Tenjin Keidai” in the series One Hundred Famous Views of Edo.

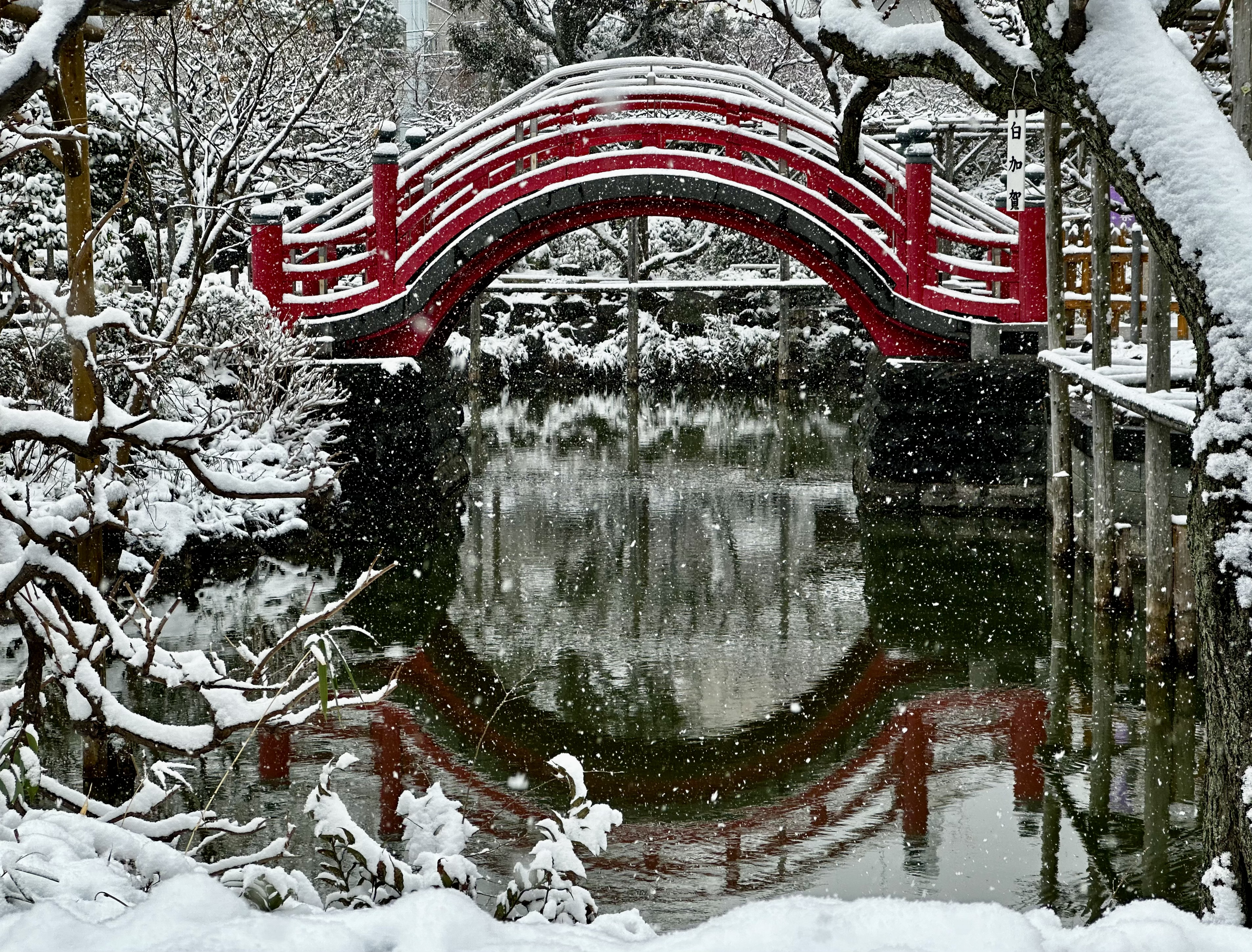
Female Bridge (February 2026) Male Bridge (February 2026) Male Bridge (February 2026)

== Gallery ==
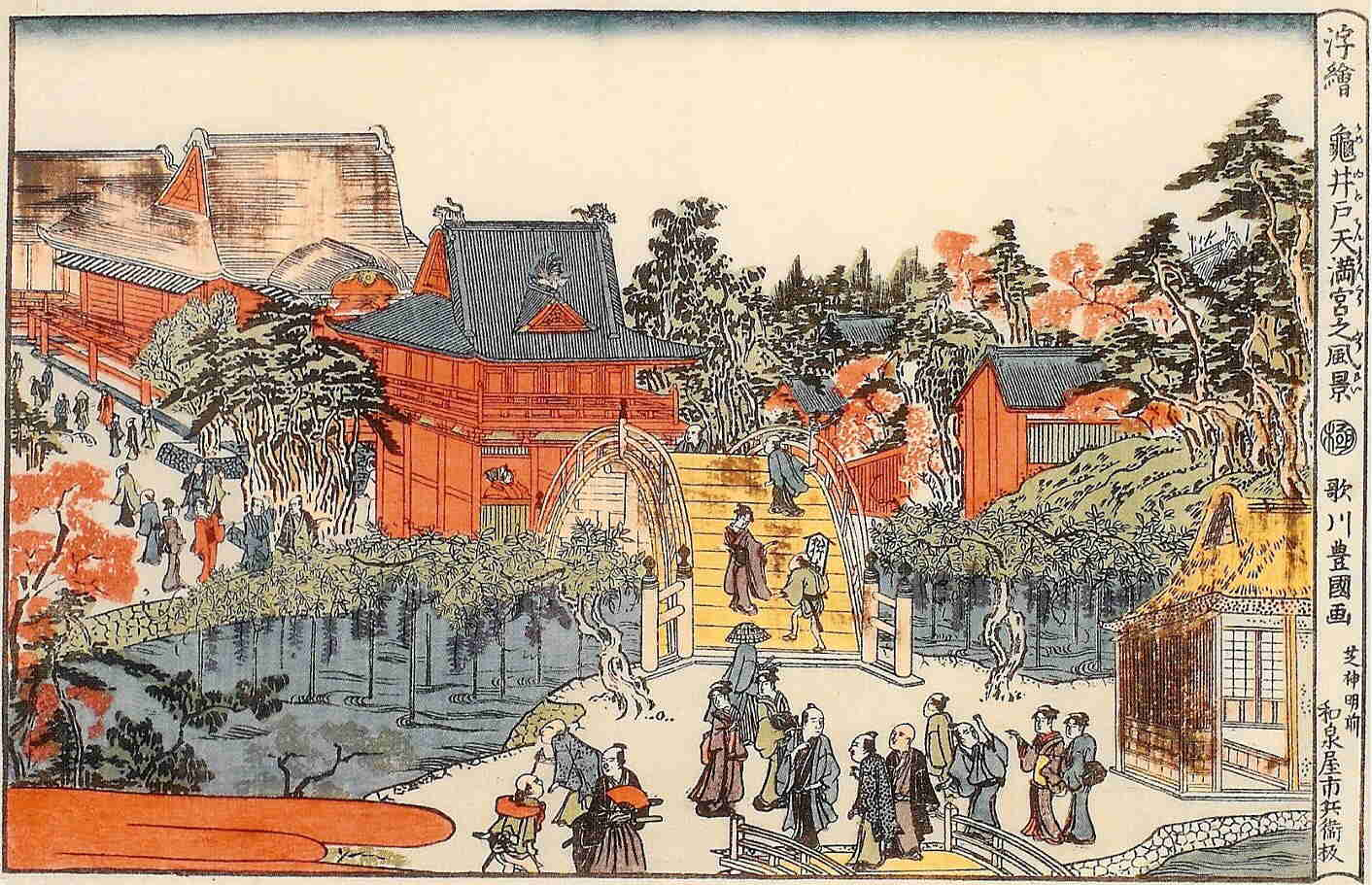
Toyokuni: Kameido (ca. 1780/90)

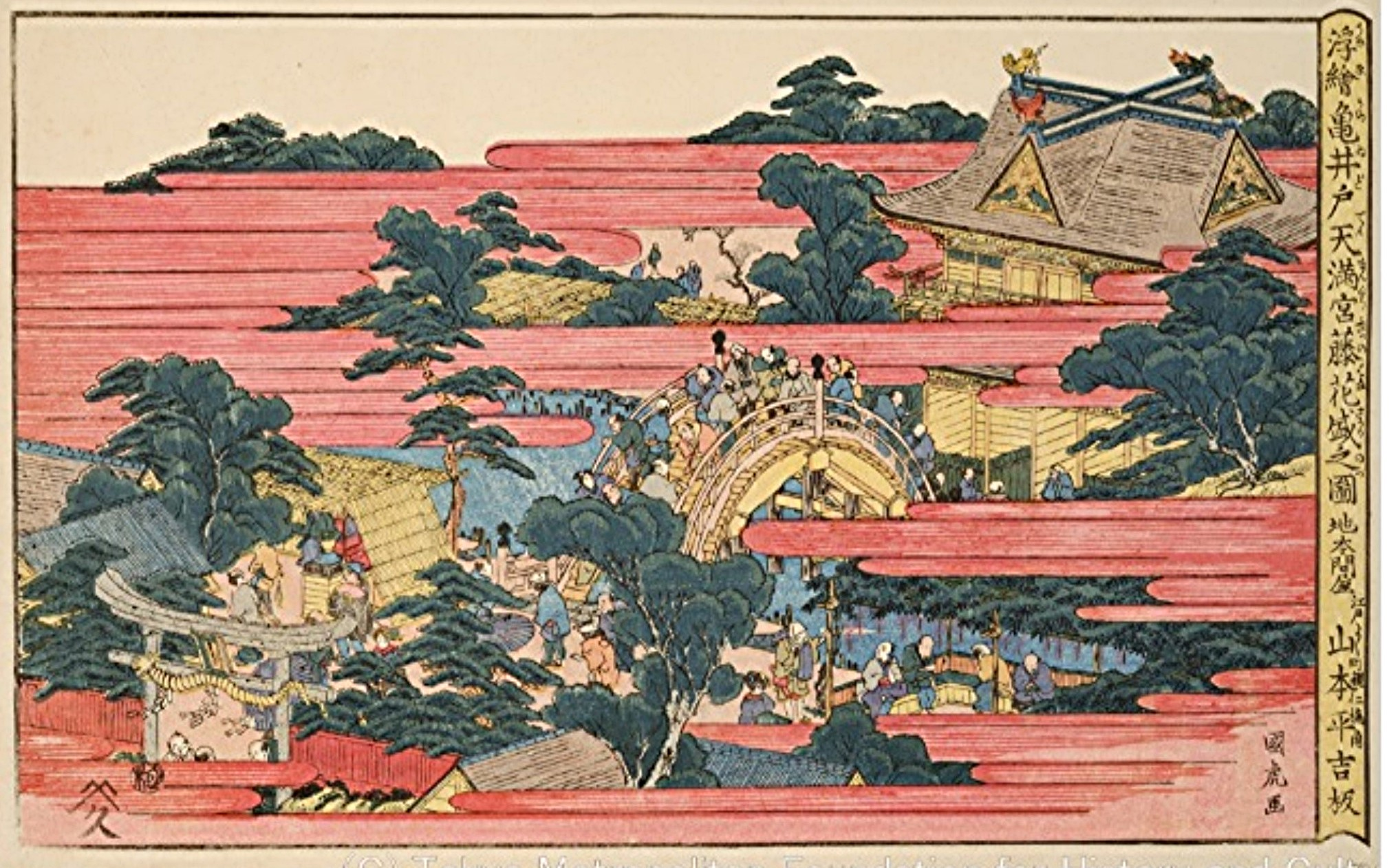
Kunitora: Kameido (ca. 1800)

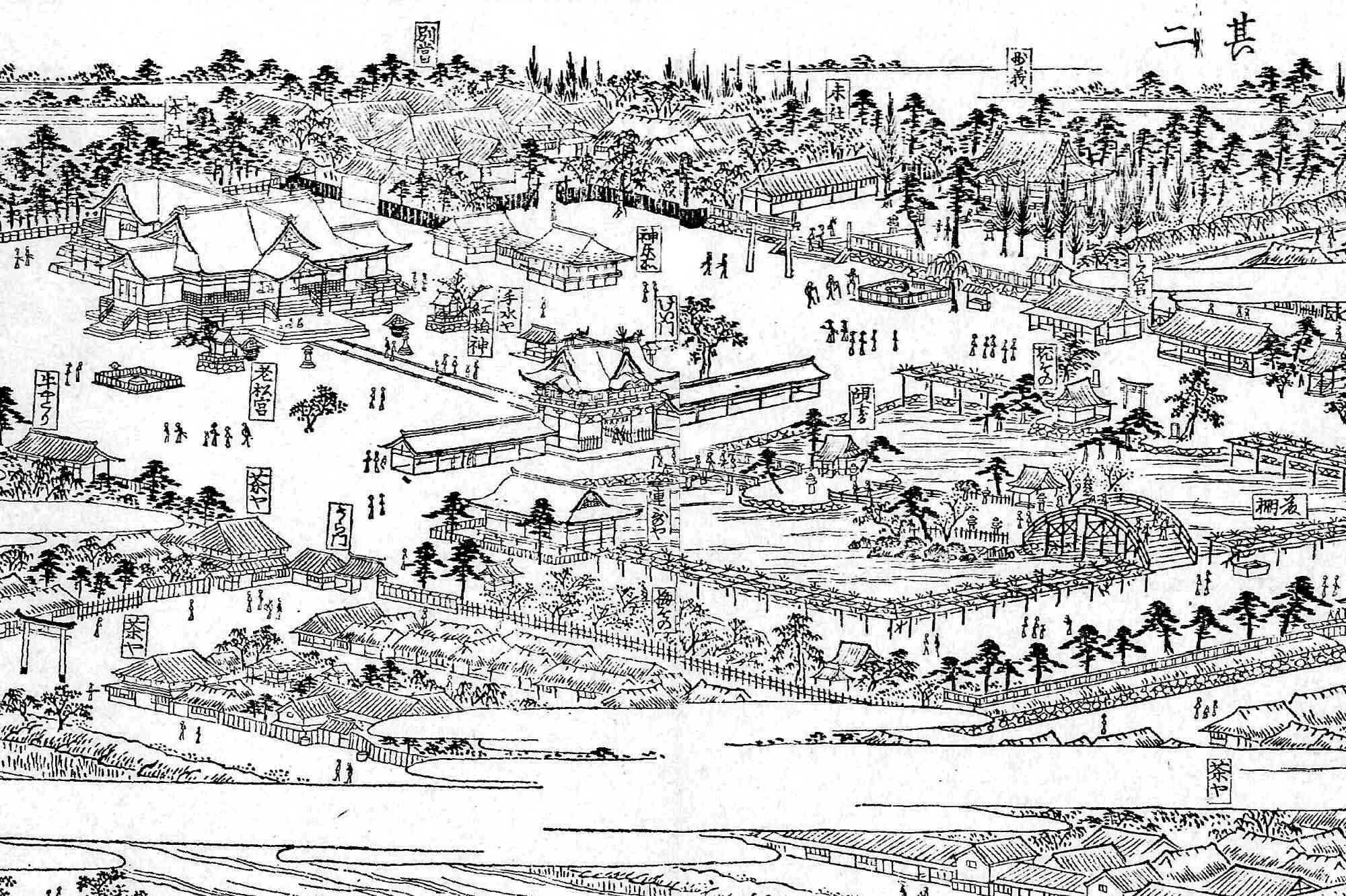
Kameido (Detail)
aus Edo meisho zue (1838)

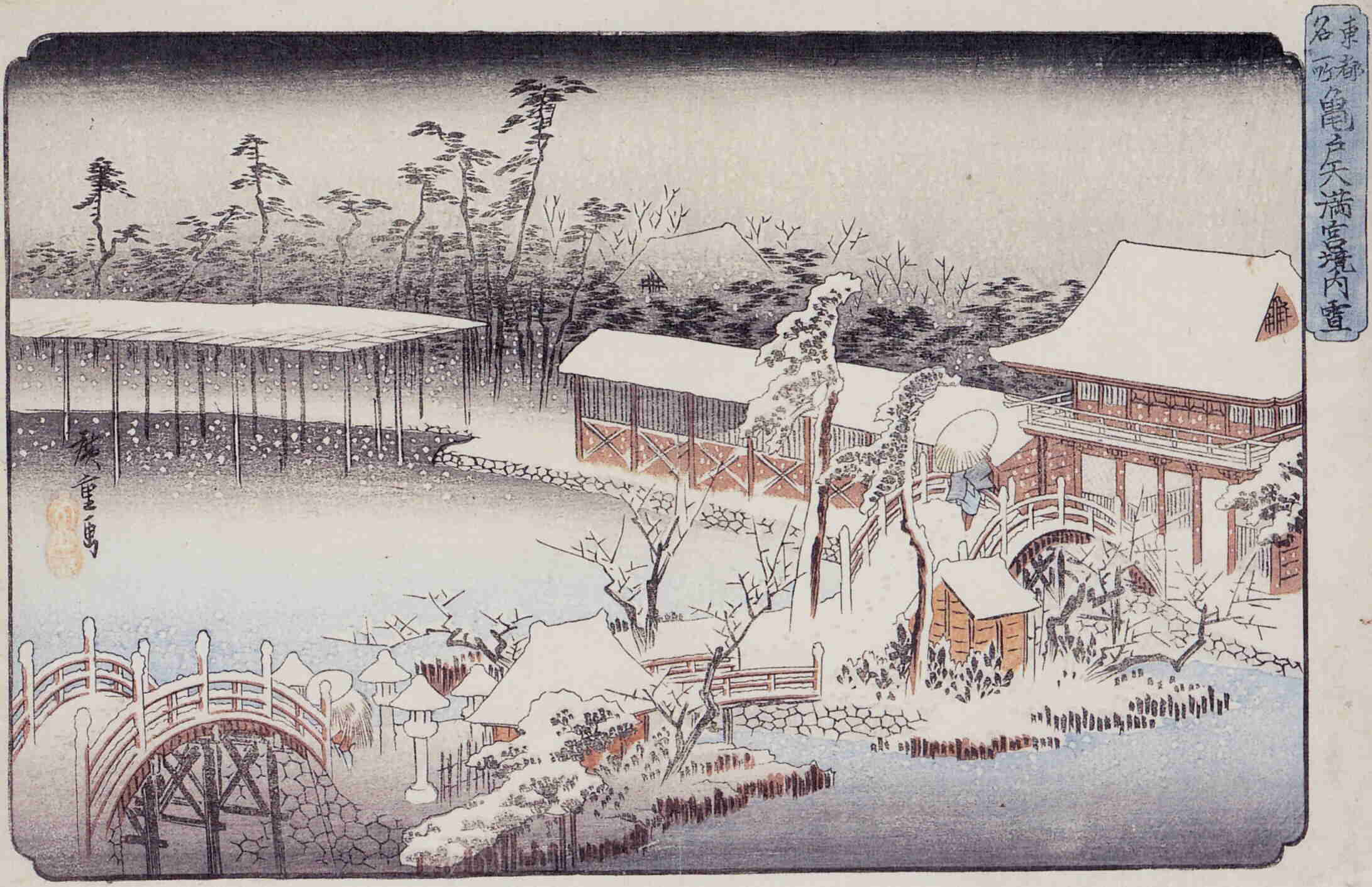
Hiroshige: Kameido in Winter

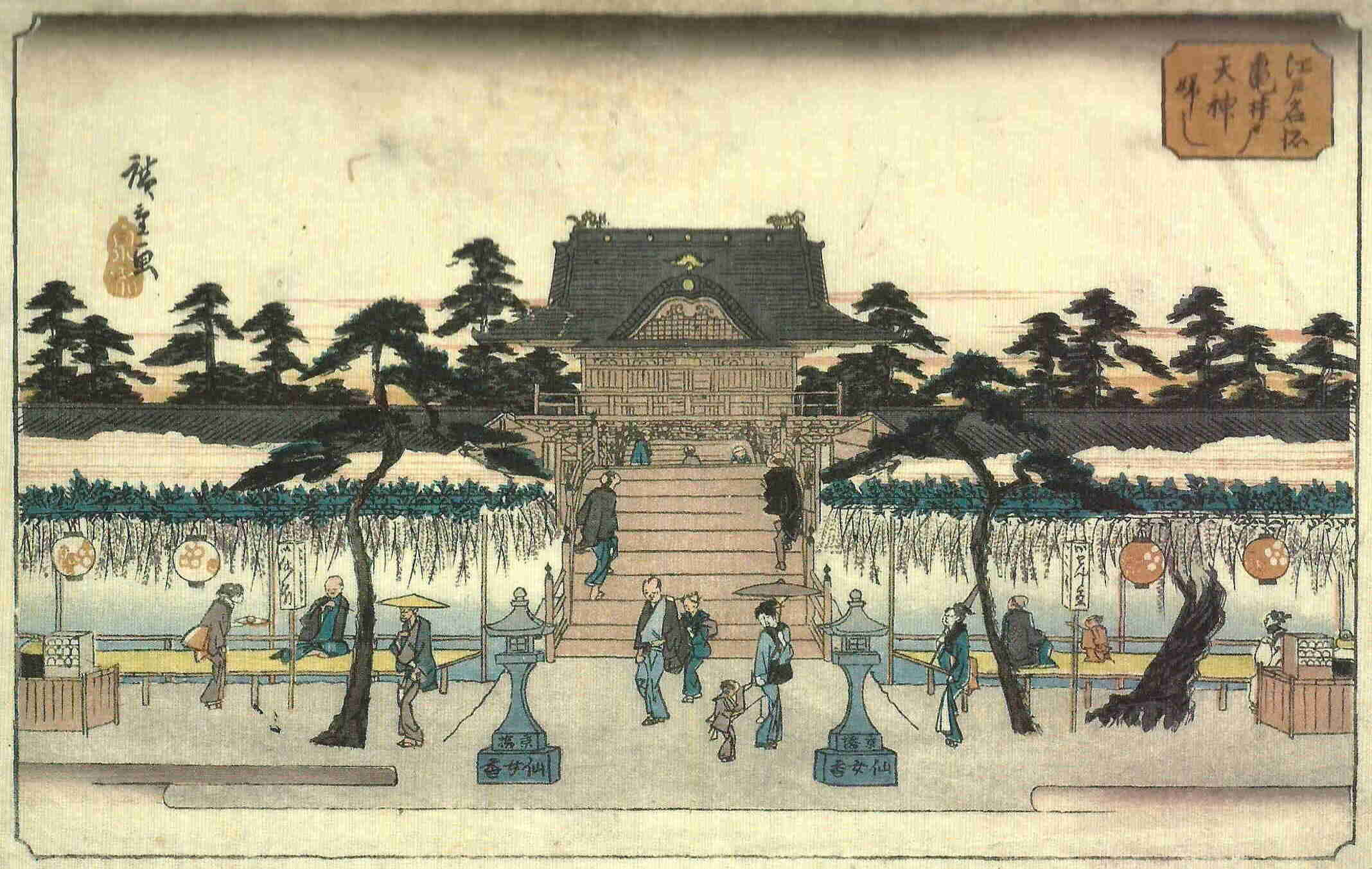
Hiroshige: Kameido frontside

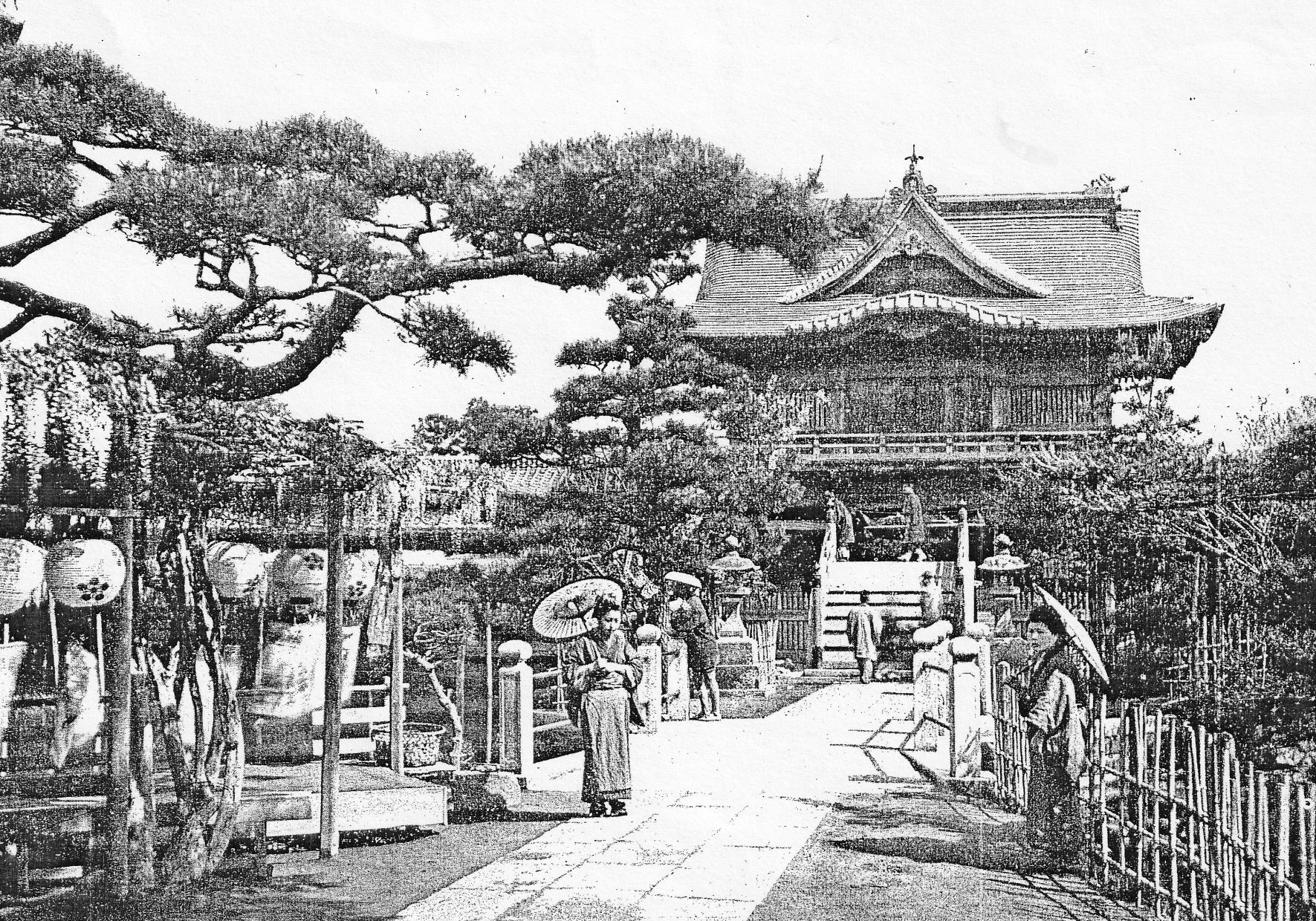
Photo, early 20th century

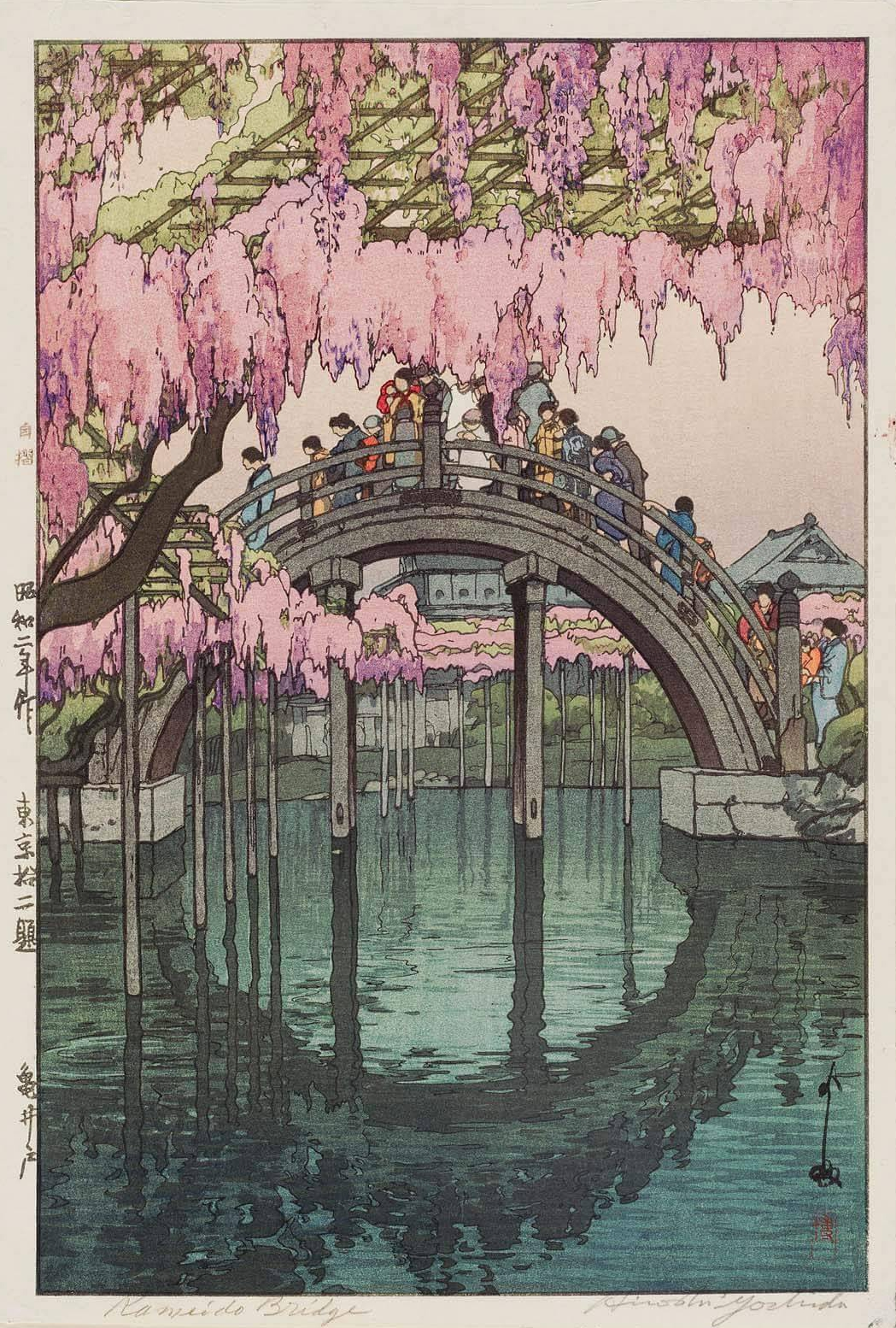
Yoshida Hiroshi, 1927

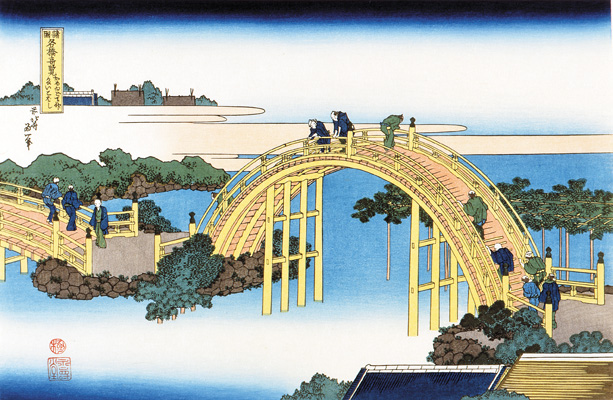
Hokusai

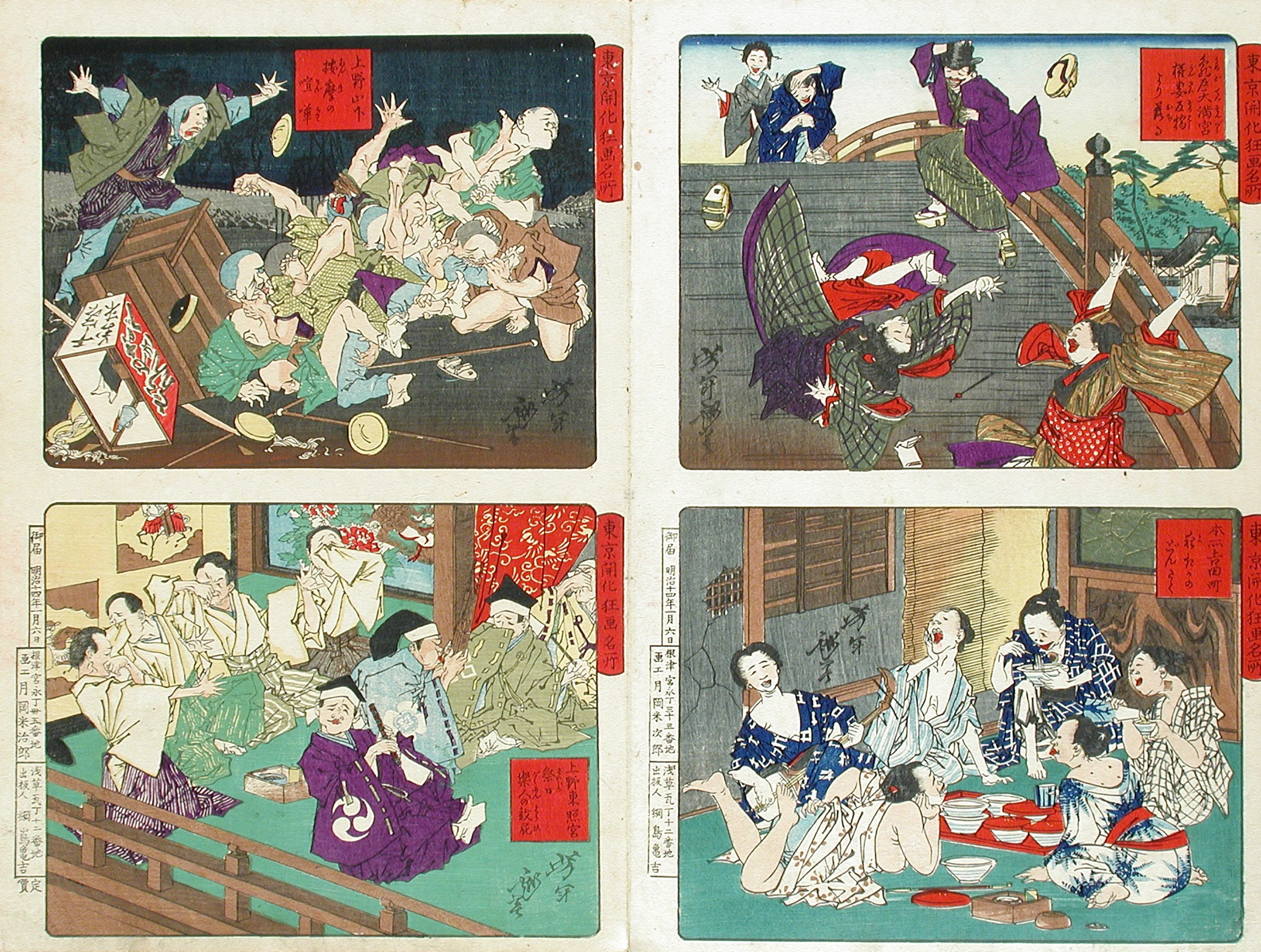

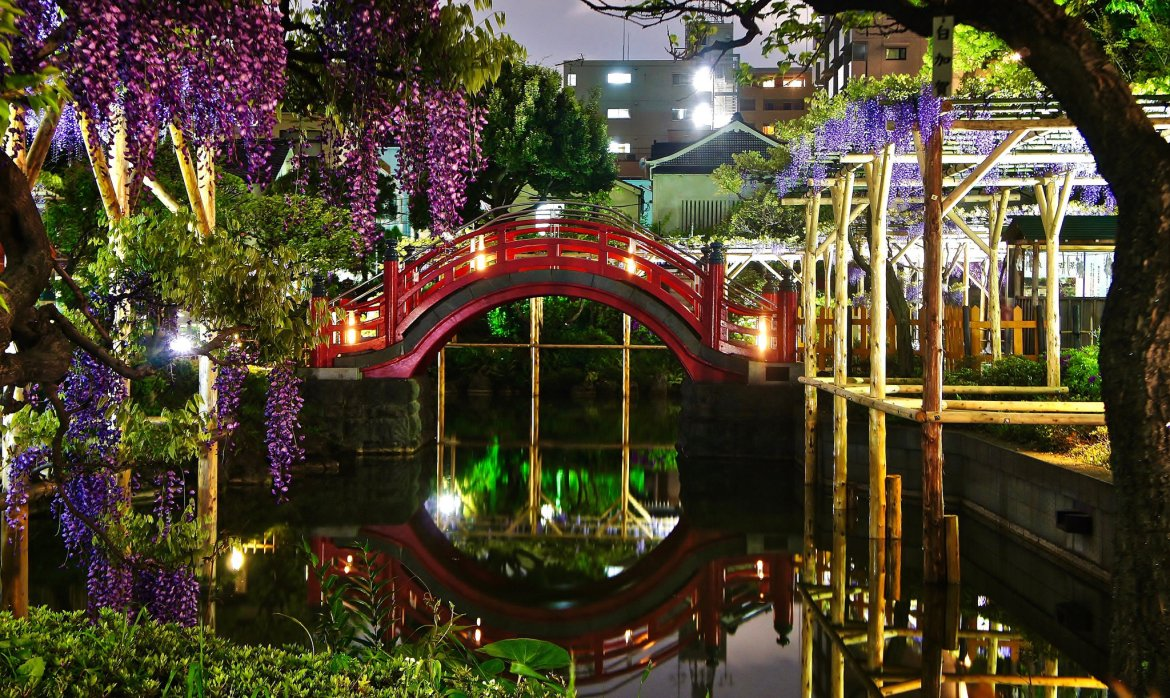

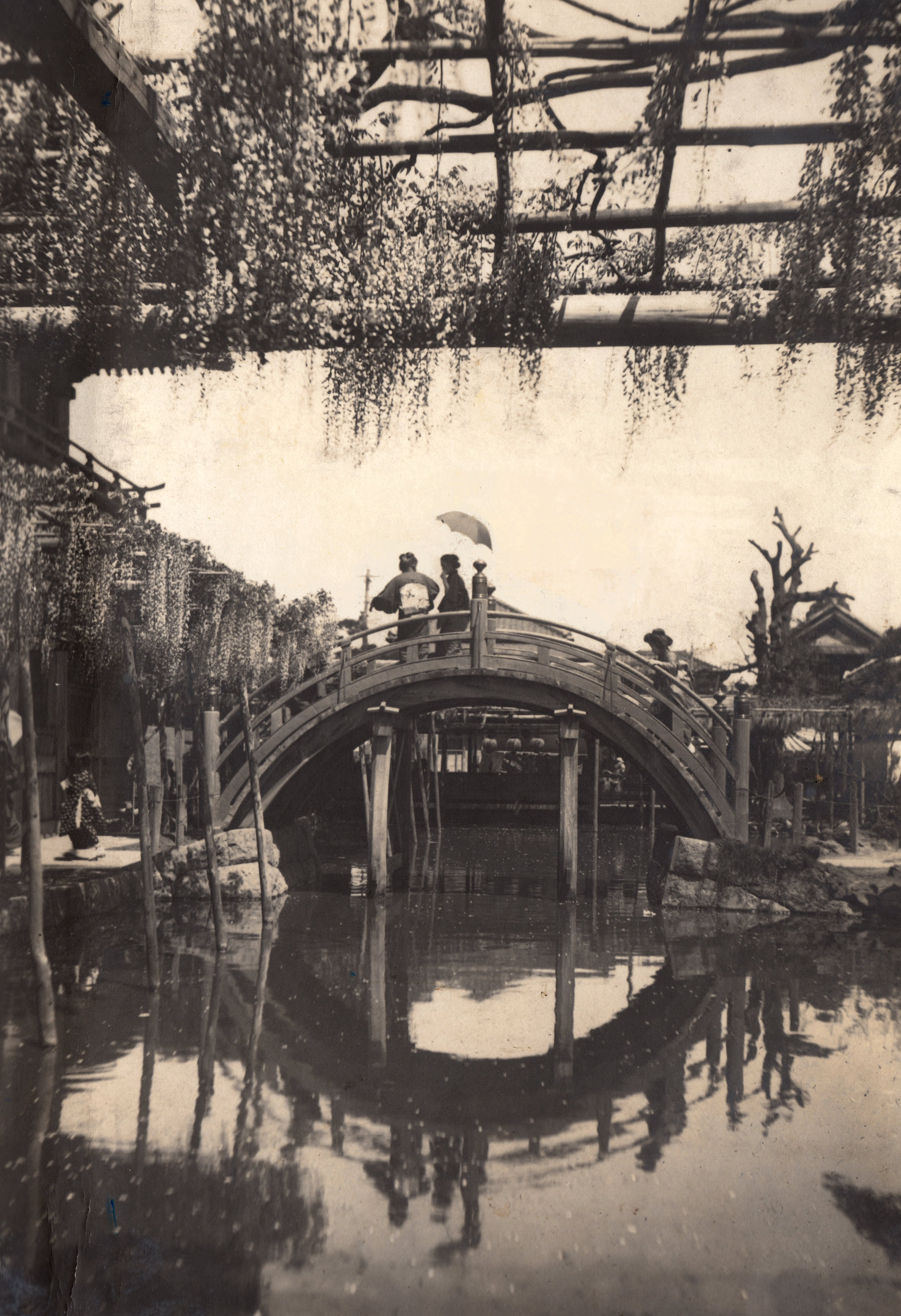
One of the shrine's drum bridges in 1914

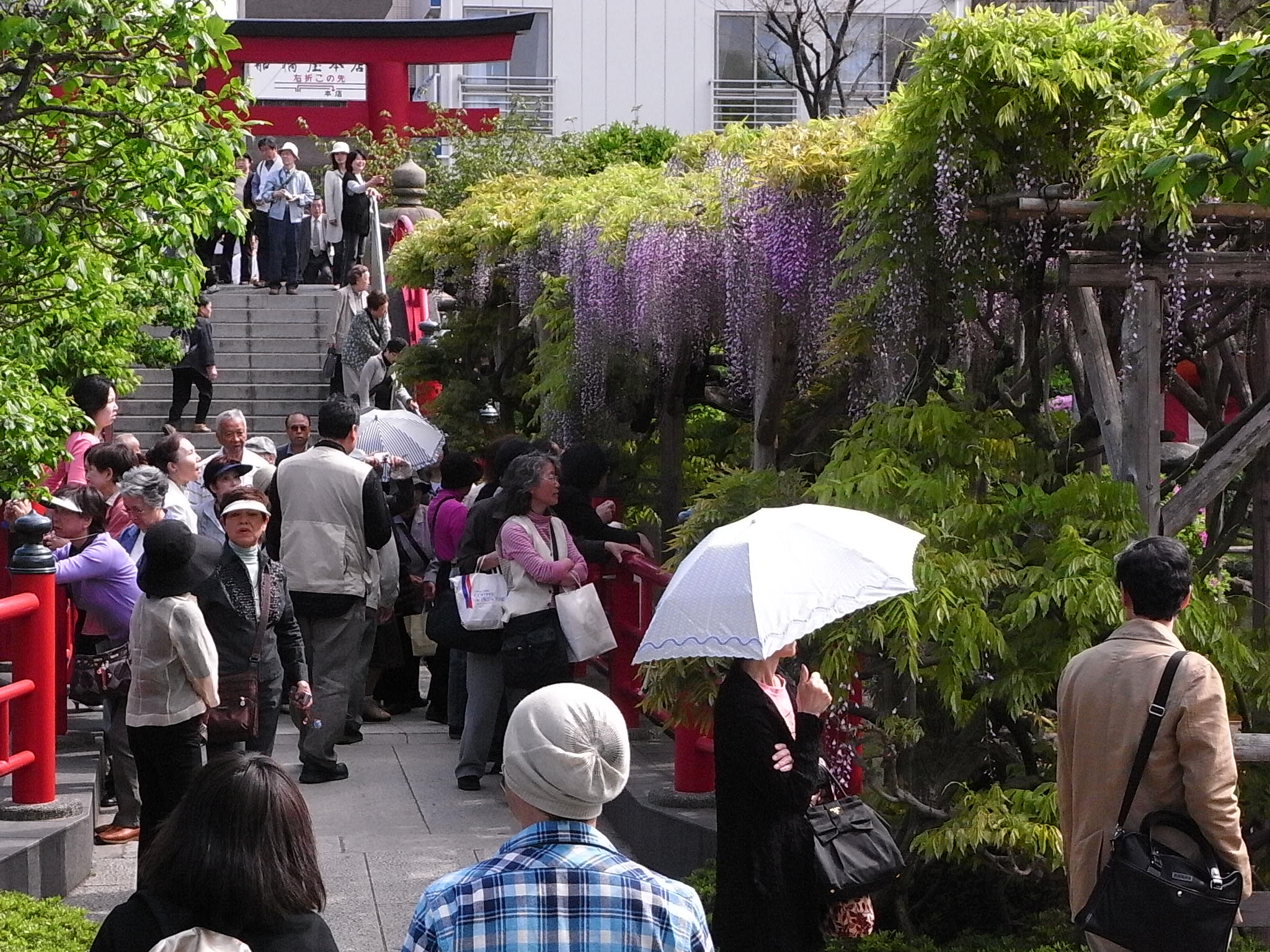
Wisteria floribunda

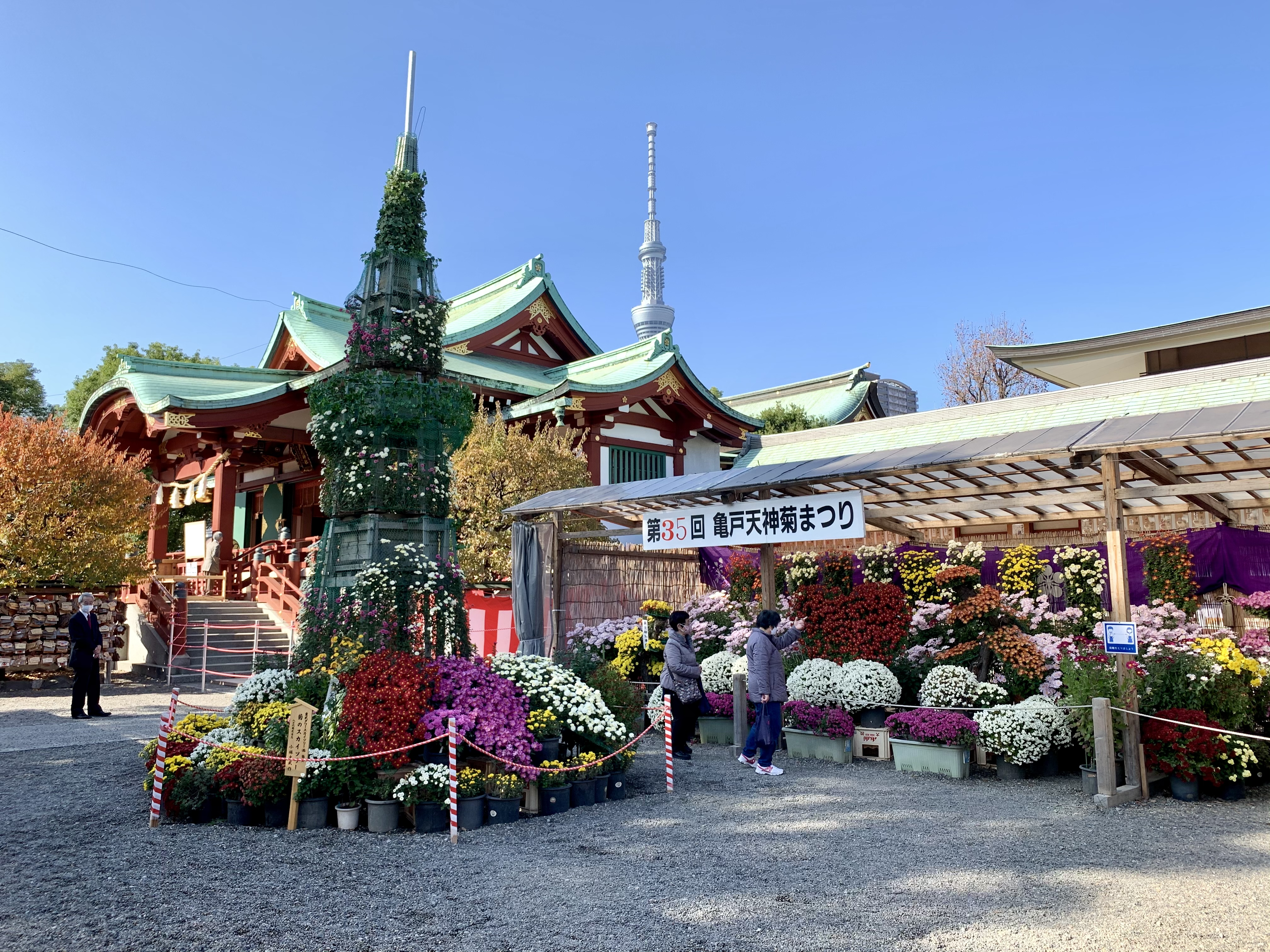
Chrysanthemum Festival (November 15, 2020)
