= Aichi Konan College =

Private junior college in Kōnan, Aichi Prefecture, Japan

- 愛知江南短期大学
- Type: Private; Junior college
- Established: 1970
- Location: Kōnan, Aichi, Japan; 35.3564°N 136.8807°E
- Website: www.konan.ac.jp (in Japanese)

Aichi Konan College (愛知江南短期大学, Aichi kōnan tanki daigaku) is a private junior college in the city of Kōnan in Aichi Prefecture, Japan. Originally established in 1970 as a women's junior college, the school became coeducational in 1998. It will be closed in 2023 because of the decrease in the number of children.
