= Fuji Matsuri =

Japanese wisteria festival

Fuji Matsuri (藤まつり, ふじまつり) is a Japanese wisteria festival that takes place during April and May. Places it is celebrated include Tokyo, Shizuoka, and Okazaki.

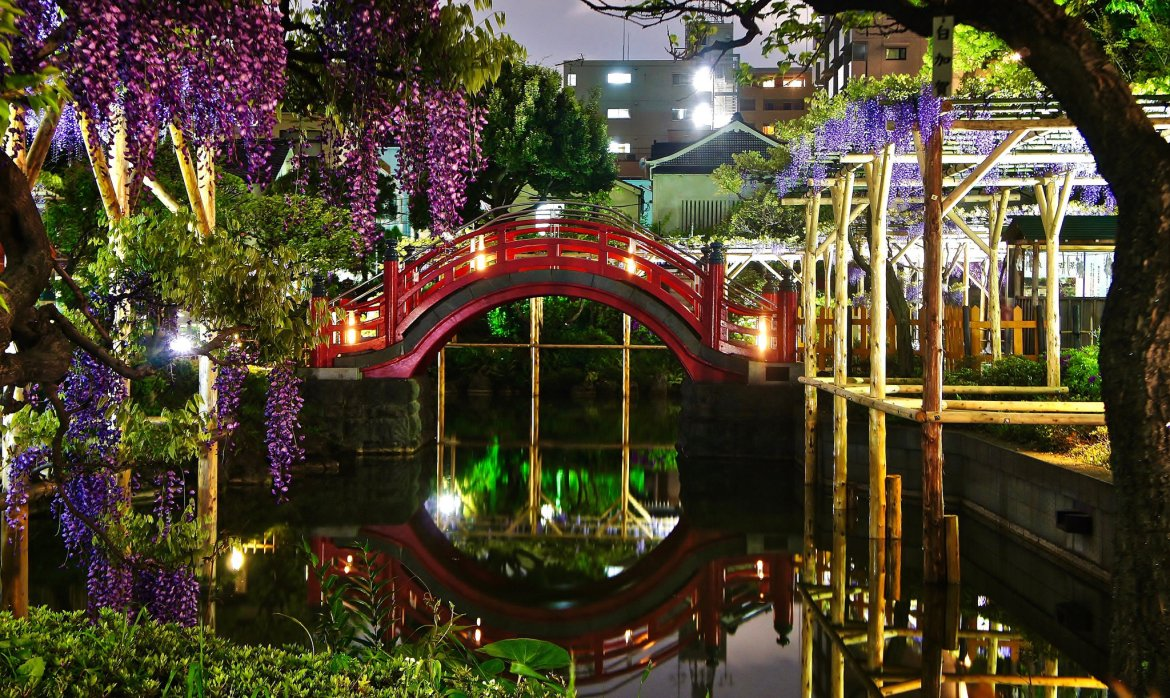
Wisteria blossoms at the Kameido Tenjin Fuji Matsuri

Fuji Matsuri is a major event every spring at the Kameido Tenjin Shrine in the Koto Ward of Tokyo.
