= Aigi Bridge =

Aigioohashi Bridge 愛岐大橋
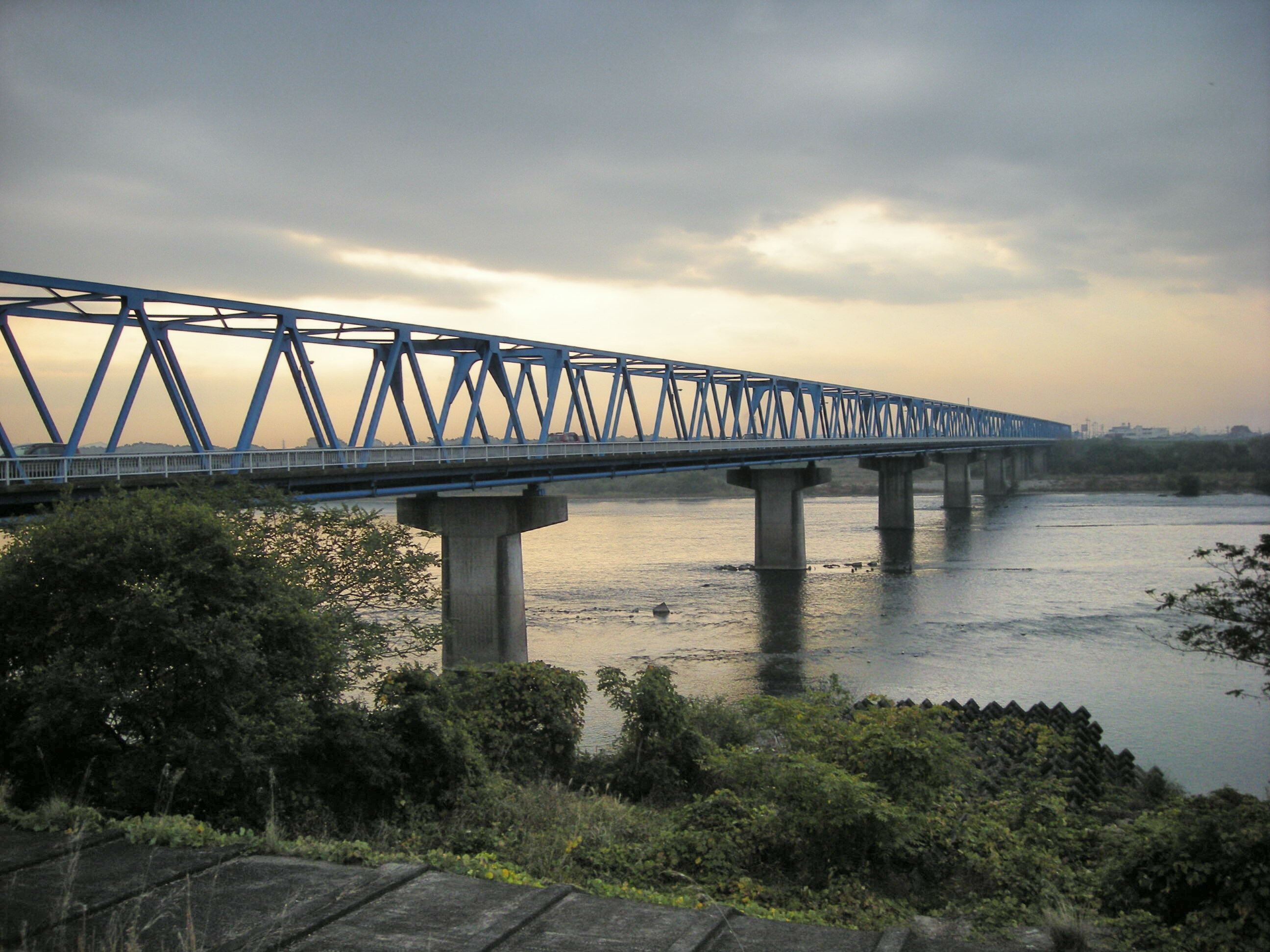
- Aigiōhashi Bridge
- Coordinates: 35.3781°N 136.8871°E
- Carries: Automobile and pedestrian traffic
- Crosses: Kiso River
- Locale: Gifu - Aichi Prefectural border

Characteristics
- Design: Truss
- Material: Iron beam, concrete
- Total length: 610.4 metres (2,003 ft)
- Width: 8.1 metres (27 ft)
- No. of spans: 9
- Piers in water: 5

History
- Opened: 1930 (foot traffic); 1969 (vehicular traffic)

Location
- Interactive map of Aigioohashi Bridge 愛岐大橋

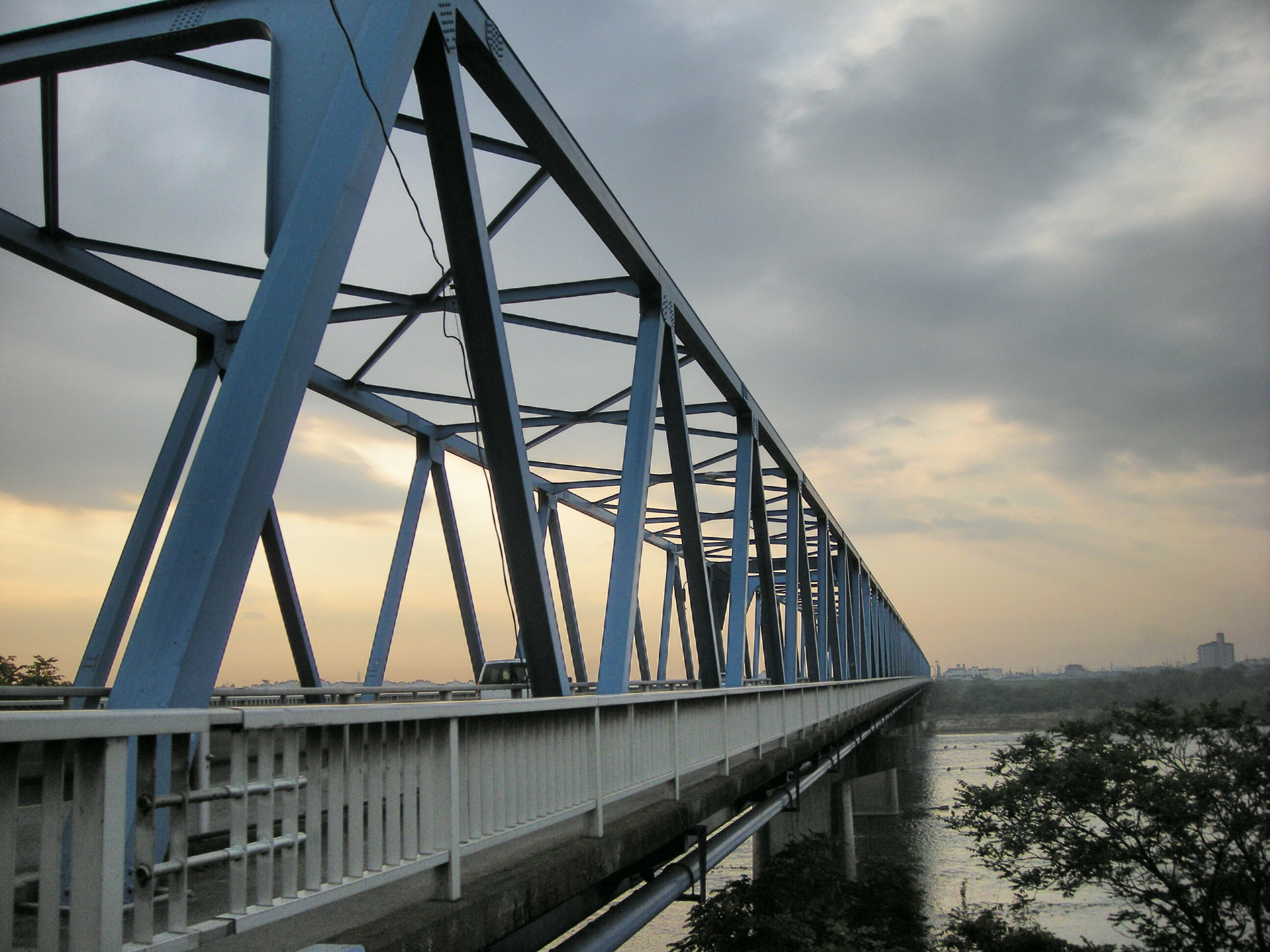

The Aigiōhashi Bridge (愛岐大橋, Aigi ōhashi) is a truss bridge over the Kiso River in Japan. It is an iron beam bridge which connects Kakamigahara in the Gifu Prefecture with Inuyama in the Aichi Prefecture. The bridge is part of Aichi-Gifu Prefectural Route 17, known as the Kōnanseki Route. The bridge is an essential link in the route from Nagoya and Komaki in Aichi Prefecture to Kakamigahara, Seki, and Gujō in Gifu Prefecture. Because there are no other bridges for 4 kilometres (2.5 mi) up- or downstream, the bridge is generally congested all day. The bridge was closed for a time in 1999 for maintenance.

The Aigiōhashi Bridge was featured in Eiji Okuda's film A Long Walk (長い散歩, Nagai Sanpo), which was at the Montreal World Film Festival.
