= Sugawara no Michizane =

Japanese scholar, poet, and politician (845–903)

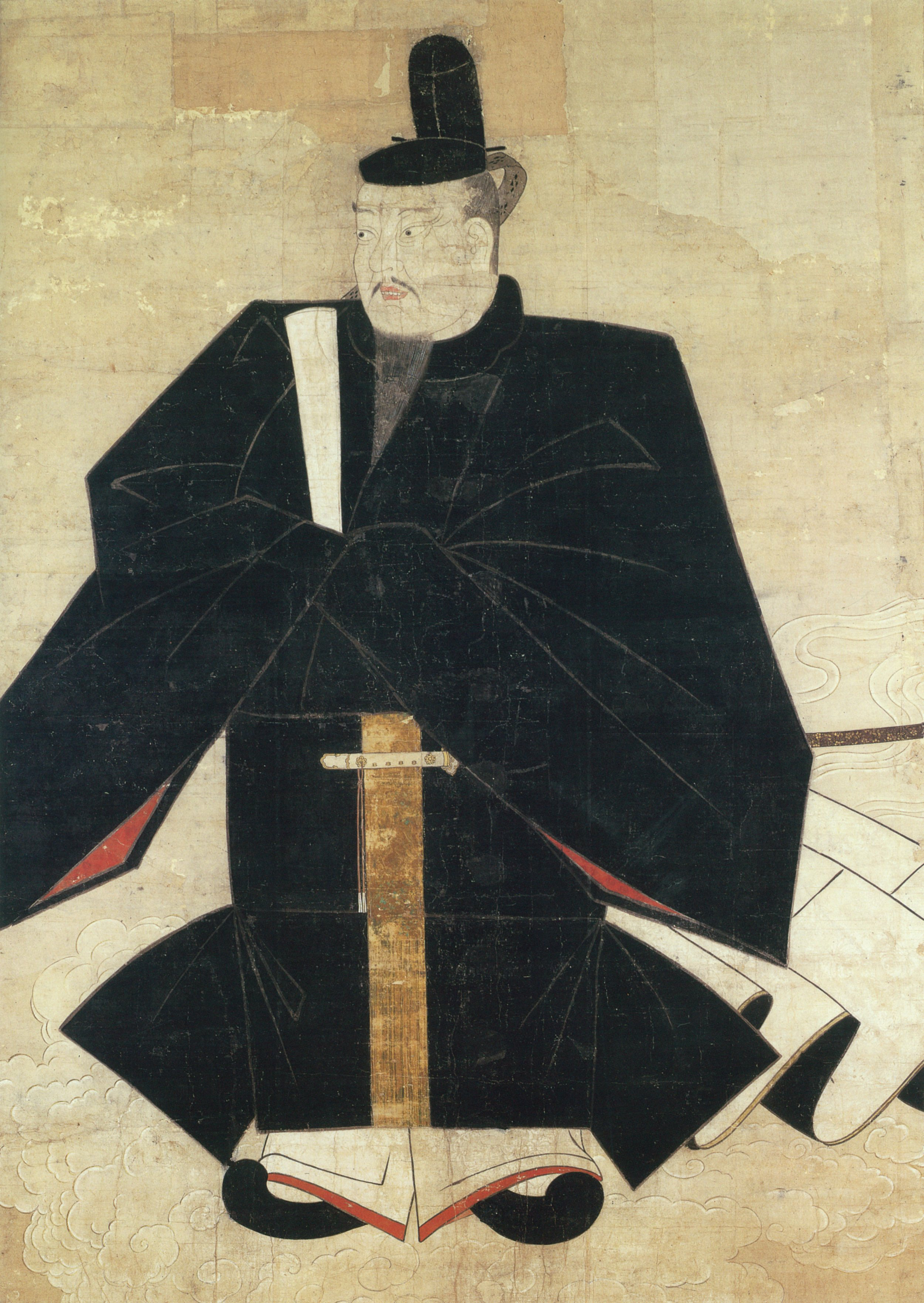
Sugawara no Michizane

Sugawara no Michizane (菅原 道真; Japanese pronunciation: [sɯ.ɡa.wa.ɾa no (|) mʲi.tɕiꜜ.(d)za.ne, sɯ.ŋa-], August 1, 845 – March 26, 903), or Kankō (菅公; [kaꜜŋ.koː], lit. 'Lord Sugawara'), was a scholar, poet, and politician of the Heian period of Japan. He is regarded as an excellent poet, particularly in waka and kanshi poetry, and is today revered in Shinto as the god of learning, Tenman-Tenjin (天満天神; often shortened to Tenjin). In the famed poem anthology Hyakunin Isshu, he is known as Kanke (菅家) (Note: Also a short name for the Sugawara clan.), and in kabuki drama he is known as Kan Shōjō (菅丞相). Along with Taira no Masakado and Emperor Sutoku, he is often called one of the "Three Great Onryō of Japan".

== Biography ==
He was born into a family of scholars, who bore the hereditary title of Ason (朝臣) which predated the Ritsuryō system and its ranking of members of the court. His grandfather, Sugawara no Kiyotomo, served the court, teaching history in the national school for future civil bureaucrats and even attained the third rank. His father, Sugawara no Koreyoshi, began a private school in his mansion and taught students who prepared for the entrance examination to the national school or who had ambitions to be officers of the court, including his own son Michizane.

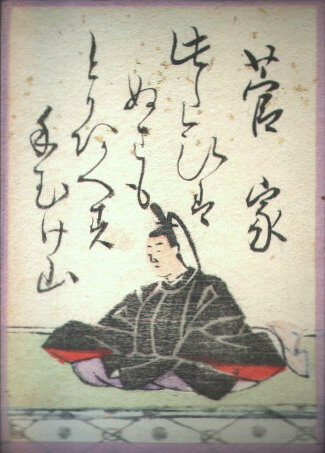
Kanke, from the Ogura Hyakunin Isshu

Michizane passed the entrance examination, and entered Daigaku, as the national academy was called at the time. After graduation he began his career in the court as a scholar as a relatively prestigious senior sixth rank upper in 870. His rank coincided with his role initially as a minor official in the court bureaucracy under the Ministry of Civil Affairs. By 874 Michizane had reached the fifth rank (his father the fourth rank), and served briefly under the Ministry of War before being transferred to a more desirable role in the Ministry of Popular Affairs. His training and skill with Classical Chinese language and literature afforded him many opportunities to draft edicts and correspondences for officials in the court in addition to his menial duties. Records show at this time he composed three petitions for Fujiwara no Yoshifusa as well as the Emperor. Michizane also took part in receiving delegations from the Kingdom of Parhae, where Michizane's skill with Chinese again proved useful in diplomatic exchanges and poetry exchange. In 877, he was assigned to the Ministry of the Ceremonial, which allowed him to manage educational and intellectual matters more than before.

In addition to his offices at the court he ran the school his father founded, the Kanke Rōka (菅家 廊下; lit. "Sugawara Family Hall"). In 877, he was also promoted to professor of literature at the academy, Later, he was also appointed Doctorate of Literature (文章博士, monjō hakushi) the highest professorial office at Daigaku. This office was considered to be the highest honor a historian could achieve.

=== Early career ===
In 886, Sugawara was appointed to be Provincial governor (Kokushi) of Sanuki Province. Modern research shows that many bureaucrats in the court, if they lacked sufficient reputation, were assigned at least one term in a remote province, and Michizane was no exception. During his four-year tenure in the province, Michizane's informal poetry increased, and up to 26% of his poetry still extant was composed in this narrow time. Among his duties, based on limited records, was to tour the province, recommend outstanding individuals to the court, and to punish as needed. In 887, Michizane had to petition and pray to the Buddhas and the Shinto kami to help relieve a drought at the time. Records of the time imply that Michizane's time as governor had met with only middling success.

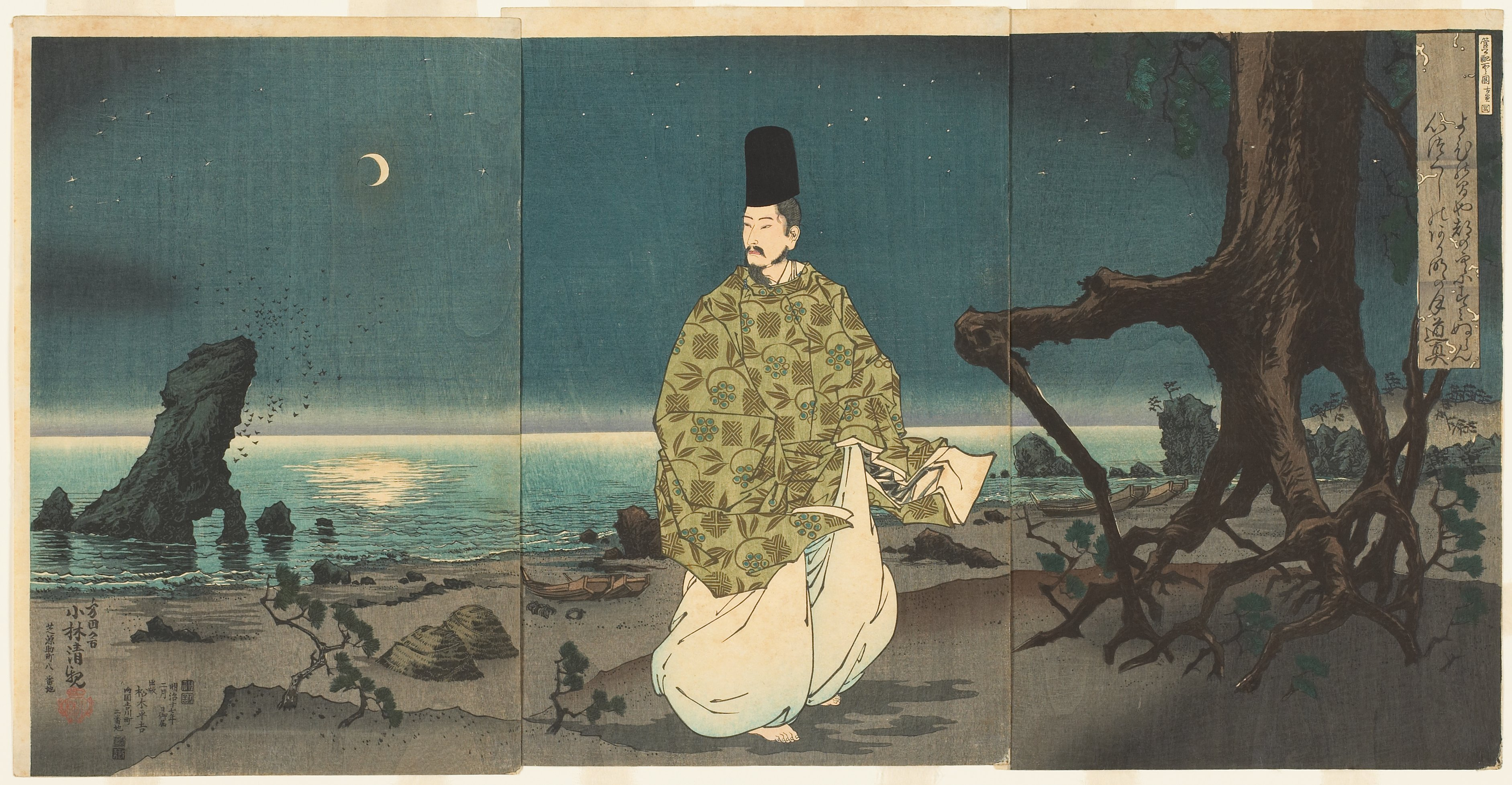
Sugawara Michizane in Exile by Kobayashi Kiyochika, 1884

=== Conflict with Fujiwara clan ===
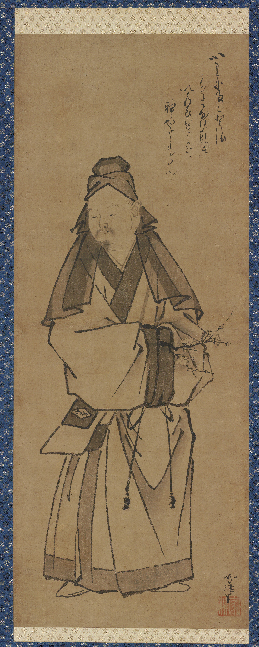
Tenjin (Michizane) Crossing to China, late 15th century by Sesshin, Muromachi period, Ink on paper

While serving as governor, a political conflict arose between Emperor Uda and Fujiwara no Mototsune of powerful Fujiwara clan called the Ako controversy or Akō Incident (阿衡事件, akō jiken) in 888 over Mototsune's unclear role in the court after Emperor Uda's ascension. Michizane, defending the court scholars and emperor, sent a letter of censure to Mototsune, and gained the favor of Emperor Uda. With his term as governor completed in 890, Michizane returned to the court in Kyoto. In Emperor Uda's struggles to restore power to the imperial family, away from the Fujiwara, a number of officials from non-Fujiwara families were promoted to key positions, including Imperial offshoots in the Minamoto family and Sugawara no Michizane. In a rapid series of promotions beginning in 891, Michizane rose to the senior third rank in 897. According to one document signed by Michizane in 894, he already held the following posts in the court:

- Ambassador to the Tang dynasty
- Consultant
- Assistant Investigator of the Records of Outgoing Officials
- Junior Fourth Rank Lower
- Major Controller of the Left
- Supernumerary Senior Assistant Minister of Ceremonial
- Assistant Master of the Crown Prince's Household (later Emperor Daigo)

He was appointed ambassador to China in the 890s, but instead came out in support of abolition of the imperial embassies to China in 894, theoretically in consideration for the decline of the Tang dynasty. On the other hand, some historians point to a power struggle between Michizane and his political rivals, the influential Fujiwara no Tokihira and other Fujiwara clans, as another reason for Sugawara Michizane to advise the emperor to abolish the Japanese envoys to Tang. The theory is that if Michizane had been sent to Tang as an ambassador, he would have been removed from the center of power at the court, and he advised the emperor to abolish the envoys to avoid this.

Within the abdication of Emperor Uda, Michizane's position became increasingly vulnerable. In 901, through the political maneuverings of his rival, Fujiwara no Tokihira, who accused him of favouring Prince Tokiyo over the crown prince as the main successor to the emperor's throne, Michizane was demoted from his aristocratic rank of junior second to a minor official post at Dazaifu, in Kyūshū's Chikuzen Province where he and his entire family was banished. He died in exile in 903.

=== Pacification and deification ===
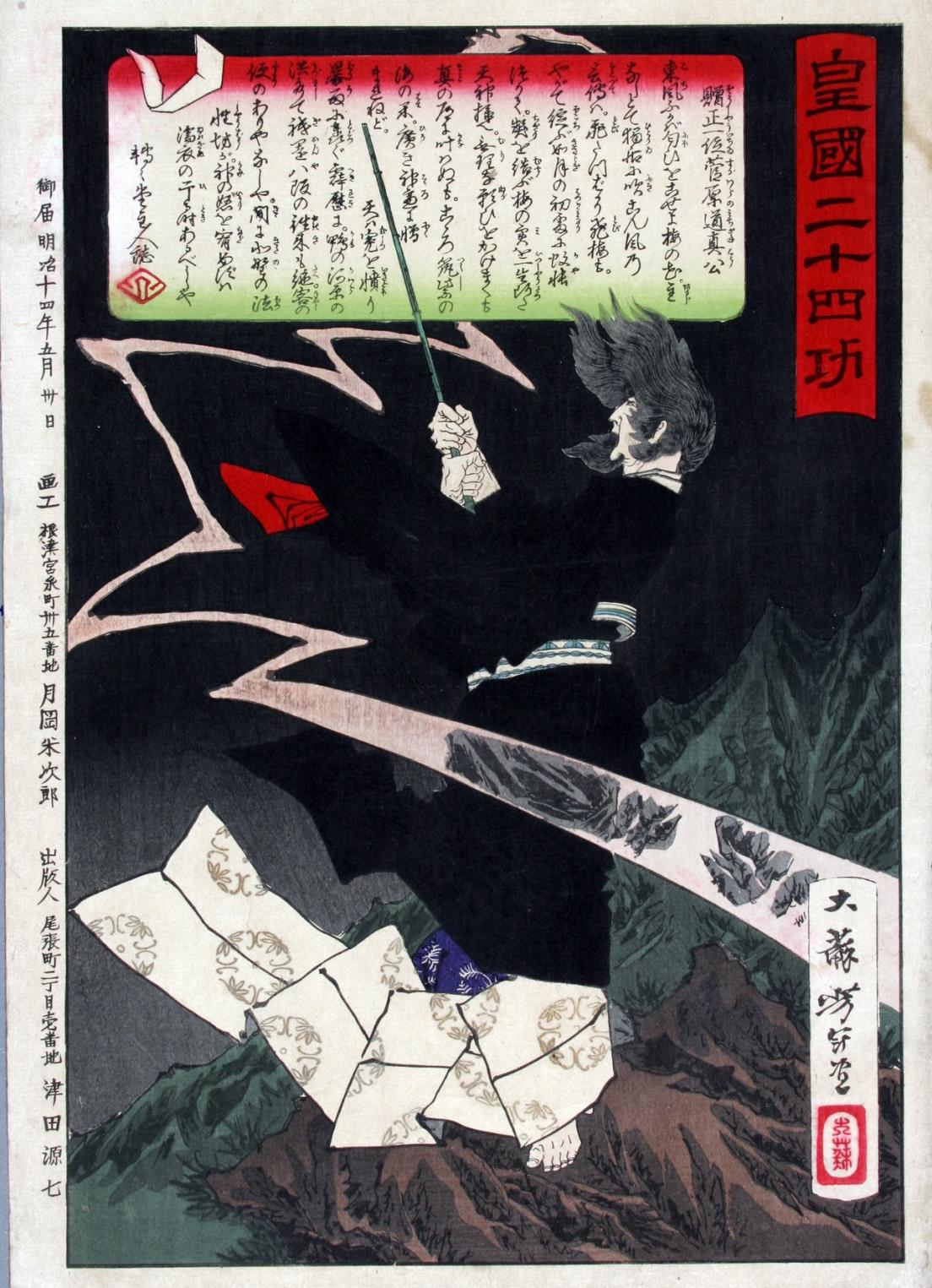
Ukiyo-e by Tsukioka Yoshitoshi depicting Sugawara no Michizane as the Tenjin (kami of thunder). After Sugawara no Michizane's death, lightning struck the palace, killing and injuring many of the powerful people involved in his banishment, and Sugawara no Michizane was enshrined in the Tenmangū (Shinto shrines) as the Tenjin.

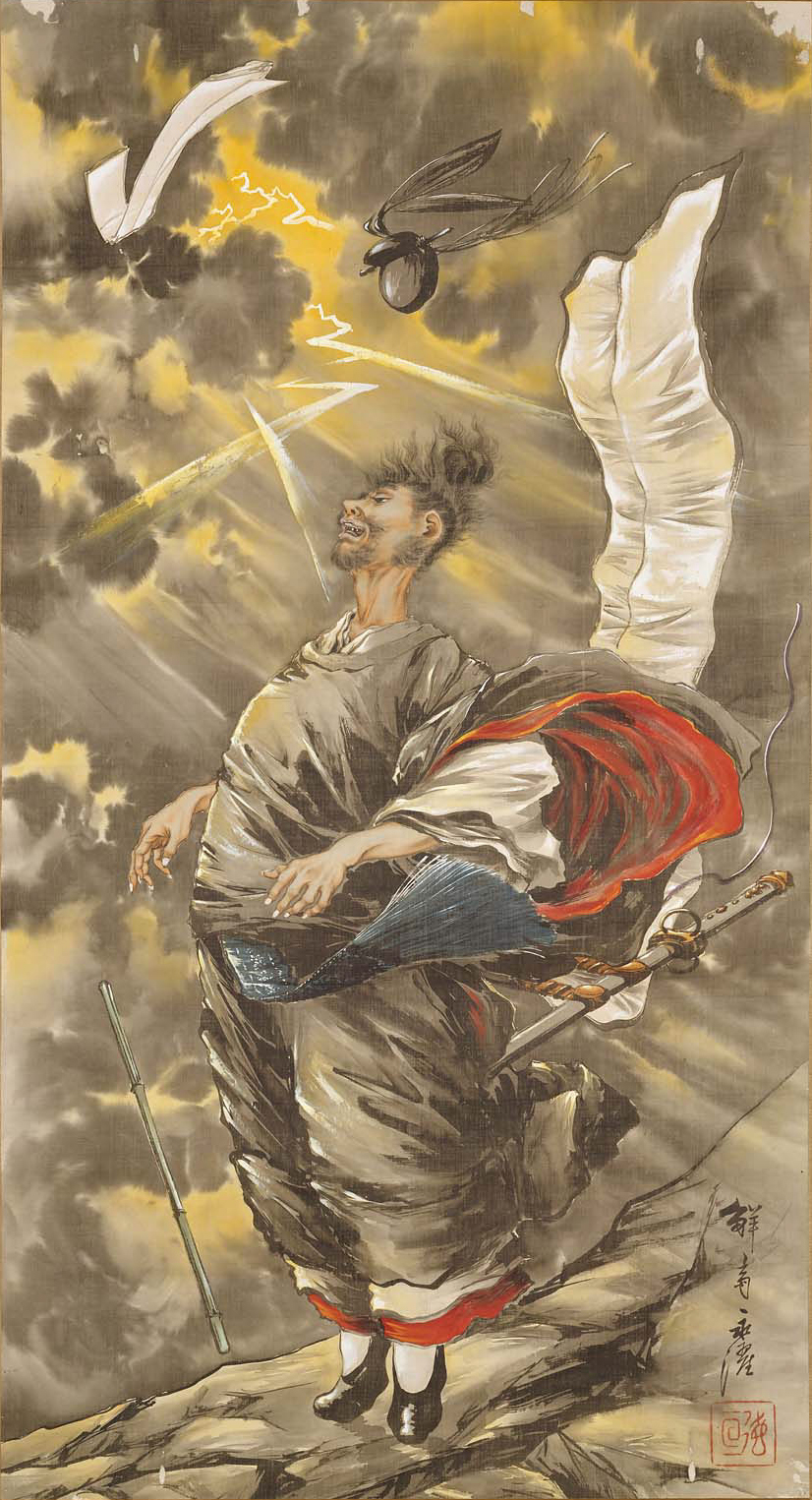
Painting by Kobayashi Eitaku depicting Sugawara Michizane reborn as the Tenjin

After Michizane's death, plague and drought spread and sons of Emperor Daigo died in succession. The Imperial Palace's Great Audience Hall (shishinden) was struck repeatedly by lightning (Seiryōden lightning strike incident), and the city experienced weeks of rainstorms and floods. Attributing the cause of these events to the vengeful spirit of the exiled Sugawara, the imperial court built a Shinto shrine called Kitano Tenman-gū in Kyoto, and dedicated it to him to appease his anger. They posthumously restored his title and office, and struck from the record any mention of his exile. Even this was not enough, and 70 years later Sugawara was deified as Tenjin-sama, a god of sky and storms. Eventually Tenjin evolved into a benign kami of scholarship.

Today many Shinto shrines in Japan are dedicated to him. He became the most notable example of an interesting spiritual transformation: as a vengeful Japanese spirit, onryō or goryō, often a former aristocrat who was wrongfully killed, and consequently seeking revenge, becomes a benign deity through ritual pacification and posthumous honors.

== Poetry ==
Michizane had an exceptional talent in poetry both for waka (poetry in Japanese) and kanshi (poetry in Chinese).

Like his father, Michizane had a talent for poetry, and it is said that he began composing waka at the age of five. His waka appeared in various Chokusen wakashū (imperial waka anthologies) compiled at the behest of successive emperors and the Daijō Tennō (abdicated emperor). His waka appear in the Kokin Wakashū, the Gosen Wakashū, the Shūi Wakashū, and the Shin Kokin Wakashū, among others. Michizane is traditionally credited with the Shinsen Man'yōshū, but the attribution has been challenged.

One of his waka was included in Fujiwara no Teika's Ogura Hyakunin Isshu:

Japanese
Rōmaji
English translation

このたびは
ぬさもとりあへず
手向山
紅葉の錦
神のまにまに

Kono tabi wa
Nusa mo toriaezu
Tamuke-yama
Momiji no nishiki
Kami no mani-mani

On this journey
I have no streamers made of silk to offer up.
Gods, if it pleases you,
may you take instead this beautiful brocade
of Mt. Tamuke's autumn colors.

The poem was originally the 420th of the Kokin Wakashū.

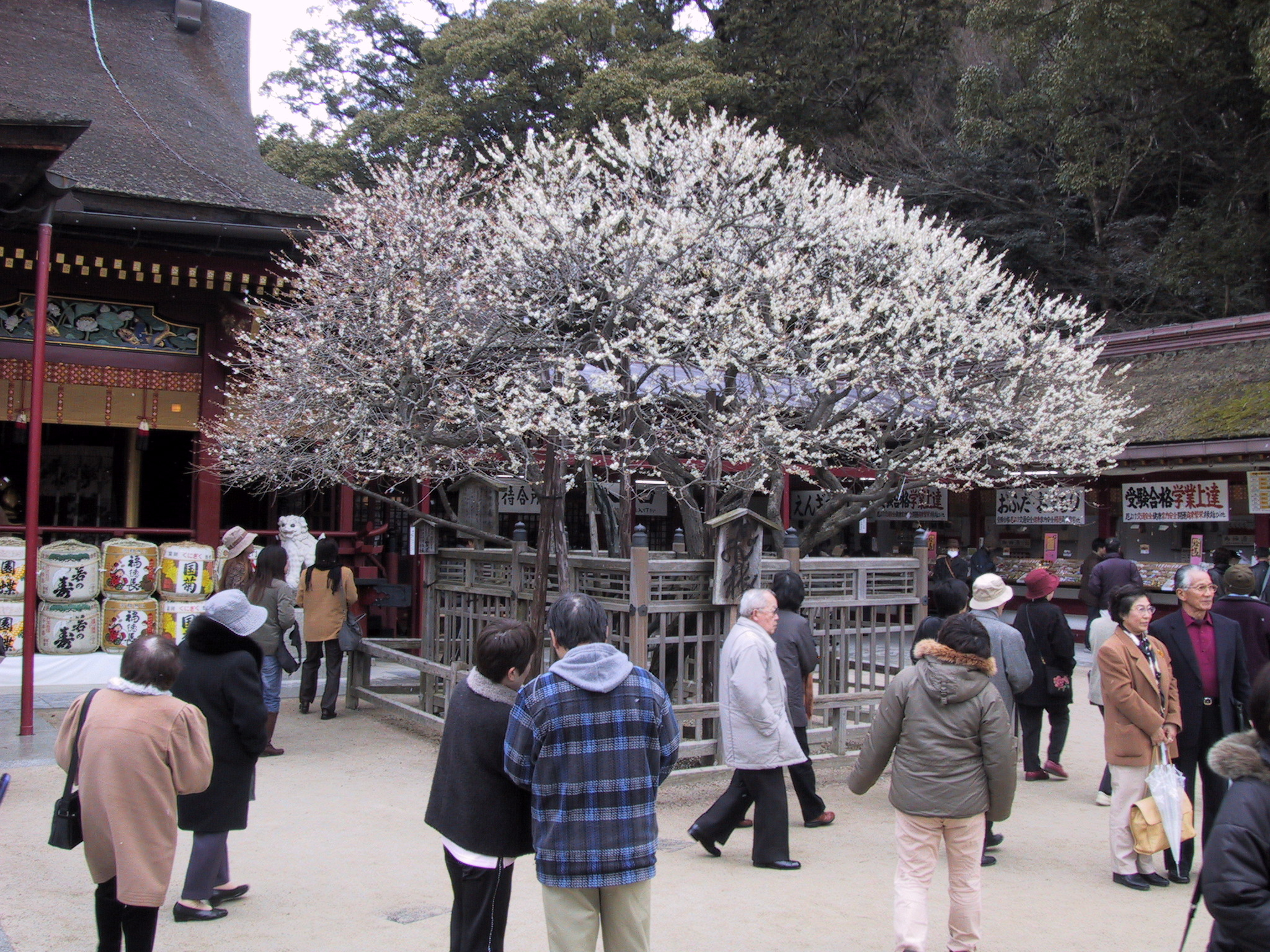
Tobi-ume or the "flying plum" at Dazaifu Tenmangū

Another of his famous waka is a poem written in 901 just before he left Kyoto for Daizaifu by demotion. He felt deep sorrow that he would never see his precious plum tree in his residence in Kyoto again, so he talked endearingly to it:

Japanese
Rōmaji
English translation

東風吹かば
にほひをこせよ
梅の花
主なしとて
春を忘るな

Kochi fukaba
Nioi okose yo
Ume no hana
Aruji nashi tote
Haru o wasuru na

When the east wind blows,
flourish in full bloom,
you plum blossoms!
Even though you lose your master
don't be oblivious to spring.

Nioi okose yo can be interpreted as "spread your scent" rather than "flourish in full bloom", although such a usage of the word nioi as "scent" or "smell" is relatively modern and rare in the classical period. The above is from the 1006th poem of the Shūi Wakashū; although this is the original form of this poem, when re-collected later in Hōbutsushū, the last phrase was modified into haru na wasure so (meaning remains unchanged), which became its popular variation. A romantic legend says the plum tree was so fond of its master that it finally flew to Dazaifu, and that tree became known as tobi-ume (飛梅; 'the flying plum') at Dazaifu Tenman-gū (a shrine dedicated to its master). A more realistic legend says Michizane or his friend transplanted its seedling to Dazaifu.

He was also interested in kanshi, because in those days the immersion in the Chinese culture was regarded as a proof of refinement and scholarship. Since his excellence in kanshi was well known throughout the court, Emperor Daigo suggested he compile his Chinese poems, and therefore he published Kanke Bunsō (菅家文草; "Chinese poetry by Sugawara no Michizane") and dedicated it to the emperor in 900. After his exile he continued to work on kanshi and compiled them into the Kanke Kōshū (菅家後集; "later anthology of Sugawara no Michizane"). The work contained 46 kanshi, was completed sometime before his death in 903. He sent it to Ki no Haseo (紀長谷雄) right before his death.

== Honours ==
- Senior First Rank (June 12, 993; posthumous)

== Descendants ==
The lineage of the Sugawara clan was divided into six families by the 18th century. Aside from these noble families, there are several (often self-proclaimed) branches in the samurai caste, including Maeda and Yagyū.

- Sugawara no Takasue (972–?) – an aristocrat, Michizane's great-grandson
  - Takasue's daughter (c. 1008 – after 1059) – a female writer known for Sarashina Nikki
- Aristocratic families (Takatsuji, Gojō, Higashibōjō, Karahashi, Kiyooka, and Kuwabara)
  - Takako Irie (1911–1995) – an actress, a daughter of Viscount Yoshinaka Higashibōjō.
- Maeda clan
  - Maeda Toshiie (1538–1599) – a daimyō lord. Toshiie self-proclaimed to be a descendant of Michizane and after decades the Tokugawa shogunate officially recognized his claim in Kan'ei Shoka Keizu Den (1643), but its historicity is highly dubious
- Yagyū clan – self-proclaimed to be a descendant of an officer called Sugawara no Nagayoshi
  - Yagyū Munetoshi (1529–1606) – the founder of Yagyū Shinkage-ryū (a school of swordsmanship)
    - Yagyū Munenori (1571–1646) – the head sword instructor of Tokugawa shōguns, author of A Hereditary Book on the Art of War

== See also ==
- Nihon Sandai Jitsuroku, the last of the Six National Histories; the de jure lead editor was Fujiwara no Tokihira but the de facto lead editors were Michizane and Ōkura no Yoshiyuki (大蔵善行).
- Ruijū Kokushi, a categorized and chronological history text
- Tenmangū
- Kitano Tenmangū
- Hattori Tenjingū

During his travel to Fukuoka, Michizane suffered from a leg Ailment and stopped by at the Hattori Tenjingu Shrine in Osaka where it was said to be cured in order for him to continue his travels.

- Tenjin Matsuri
- Tenjin is also revered each July at two yamaboko floats—Abura Tenjin Yama and Arare Tenjin Yama—in Kyoto's famous Gion Festival.
- Taira no Masakado, another influential figure from Japan's past who, like Michizane, was eventually deified as a guardian spirit

== Bibliography ==
- Robert Borgen (1994). Sugawara no Michizane and the Early Heian Court. University of Hawaii Press
- Keene, Donald (1999). A History of Japanese Literature, Vol. 1: Seeds in the Heart — Japanese Literature from Earliest Times to the Late Sixteenth Century. New York: Columbia University Press. ISBN 978-0-231-11441-7.
- McMillan, Peter 2010 (1st ed. 2008). One Hundred Poets, One Poem Each. New York: Columbia University Press.
- Suzuki Hideo, Yamaguchi Shin'ichi, Yoda Yasushi 2009 (1st ed. 1997). Genshoku: Ogura Hyakunin Isshu. Tokyo: Bun'eidō.
