= The Blade of the Courtesans =

1986 novel by Keiichiro Ryu

- Author: Keiichiro Ryu
- Original title: Permit for Yoshiwara (吉原ごめんじょ, Yoshiwara Gomenjo)
- Translator: James M. Vardaman
- Language: Japanese
- Publisher: Vertical Inc (US)
- Publication date: 1986
- Publication place: Japan
- English publication date: 2008
- Media type: Print (Hardback)
- Pages: 304
- ISBN: 978-1-934287-01-9

The Blade of the Courtesans is a historical fiction novel by Japanese author Keiichiro Ryu originally published in 1986. It was published in English by Vertical Inc in 2008. Ryu's debut novel, it was nominated for a Naoki Award and "instantly made him a doyen of historical fiction."

== Plot summary ==
"The grueling, century-long battle royal that plunged Japan into “an Era of the Warring States” has finally ended, and the victorious Tokugawa clan rules the freshly-united Land of the Rising Sun. The shogun will come from the Tokugawa line for more than two hundred years, right until Commodore Perry’s "black ships" force the far eastern archipelago into modernity. While the Mikado or emperor retains prestige, he is but a figurehead. It is the beginning of the Edo period.

Yet, despite the onset of peace and prosperity, trouble brews in Yoshiwara, the pleasure quarters of Edo where geisha courtesans count among their clientele numerous bored samurai who are no longer called upon to fight. The issuance of a gomenjo or permit for the red-light district is threatening to occasion a momentous power struggle. The courtesans themselves have no blade of their own—not until an unspoiled young swordsman from the mountains of Higo province arrives in Edo.

Raised by the late legendary Miyamoto Musashi and mysteriously sent to the capital by him, the innocent but lethal Matsunaga Seiichiro bears a secret that is hidden even from himself: he is of the imperial family. Having barely survived as ruthless purge by Tokugawa minions as an infant thanks to Musashi, the youth is now more than ready to stand his own against forces that stubbornly seek his death. But the infamous Yagyu clan that serves the shogun includes ninja as well as daylight warriors among its ranks."

== Characters (in order of appearance) ==
- Matsunaga Seiichiro- a samurai of good moral character and superb swordsmanship skills. He is revealed to be the son of retired Emperor Go-Mizunoo.
- Miyamoto Musashi- a legendary swordsman who rescues the infant Seiichiro and raises him in the secluded mountains of Higo Province.
- Shoji Jin'emon- former master of the Nishidaya, a prominent courtesan establishment in Yoshiwara. His daughter Nabe married Jinnojo, Nishidaya's current proprietor, and together they had Oshabu.
- Shoji Jinnojo- son-in-law of Jin'emon and father of Oshabu.
- Shoji Oshabu- a nine-year-old girl who is able to see the future and read other people's thoughts.
- Mizuno Jurozaemon- a hatamoto or direct retainer of the shogun, and leader of a band of rough samurai called the Jingi-gumi. According to Seiichiro he has a particularly large nose.
- Kagazume Kai- one of Mizuno's retainers and a member of the Jingi-gumi. Seiichiro nicknames him "Crab" on account of his wide forehead.
- Gensai- a kind old man who becomes Seiichiro's friend, mentor, and guide around Yoshiwara.
- Katsuyama- a beautiful tayu or highest-level oiran. She harbors feelings for Seiichiro but has dark secrets.
- Miuraya Shizaemon- the very fat and anxious bohachi or house proprietor of Omiuraya or Great Miura, the most prominent house in Yoshiwara.
- Nomura Gen'i, Yamadaya Sannojo, and Namikiya Genzaemon- three former disciples of Musashi from Shinmachi, Edo's Edocho Nichome, and Kakucho respectively.
- Yagyū Rendo/Rokuro, also called Retsudō Gisen, also called Gizen- founder of the Yagyū clan's Hotokuji temple and leader of the Yagyu Ura branch of ninja. Rather hot-headed and bloodthirsty.
- Sagawa Shinza(emon)- Gizen's right-hand commander.
- Yagyū Munefuyu- Gizen's older, calmer brother and leader of both the entire Yagyū clan and its main ninja forces. Took over for his and Gizen's eldest brother Yagyū Jūbei Mitsuyoshi when Jubei was killed seven years ago.
- Notori Takumi- Munefuyu's chief retainer and the Yagyu clan's best tactician.
- Sendai Takao or Takao II- the most famous tayu in Yoshiwara, employed by Miuraya and eventual love of Seiichiro.
- Kageyama Sanjuro- a hatamoto or direct vassal to the shogun, and a "newcomer" (or, in actuality, a spy) to Mizuno's Jinjigumi group of samurai.
- Obaba-sama- the leader of the "legendary Eight Hundred Bhiksuni," wandering spiritual mediums-priestesses based in the famous Kumano region
- Sarada Jirosaburo Motonabu- a wandering swordsman who becomes employed by Tokugawa Ieyasu himself for a top-secret mission.
- Tenkai- a priest of Mount Hiei and advisor to Ieyasu
- Honda Tadakatsu- one of Ieyasu's four closest generals and allies
- Sakai Tadakiyo- senior councilor of Ieyasu's great-grandson Tokugawa Ietsuna and secret ally of Gisen

== Reception ==
“The violence is ultra-modern and the fights are the literary equivalent of a contemporary martial arts film and are played out with cinematic speed and balletic grace. The novel is full of well-researched information… It is told in a straightforward manner yet includes elements of magic, fantasy, romance, and chivalry. Vertical has yet again published a book that, without its commitment to contemporary Japanese literature, would never have been translated into English.”- The Japan Times
