= Yagyū clan =

Japanese family of feudal lords

Yagyū clan 柳生氏
- Home province: Yamato
- Parent house: Sugawara clan
- Titles: Various
- Dissolution: Still extant

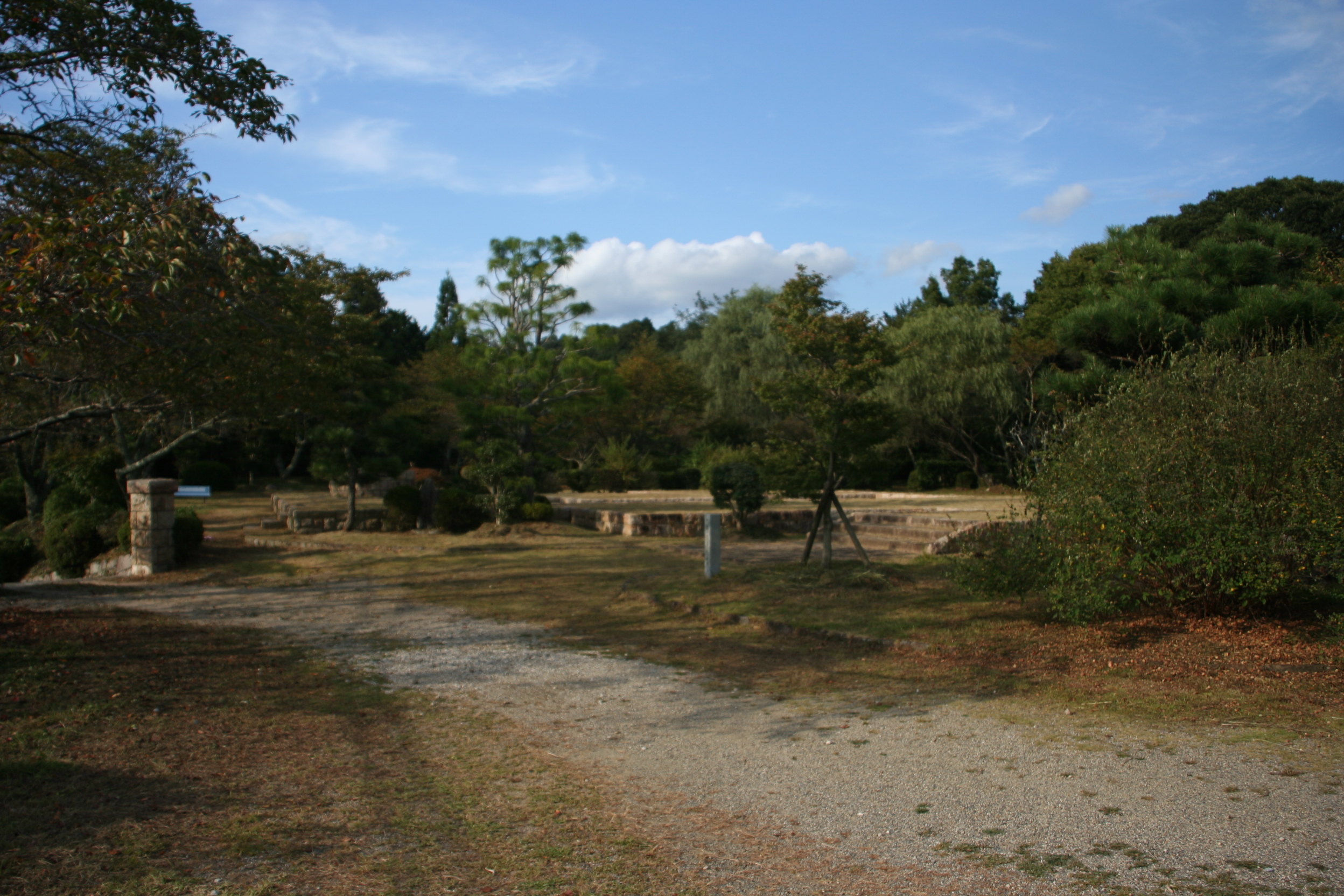
Ruins of the Yagyū Clan Residence, located near Nara, Japan, once home to the famous samurai family known for their expertise in swordsmanship and their service to the Tokugawa shogunate.

The Yagyū (柳生氏, Yagyū-shi) were a family of daimyō (feudal lords) with lands just outside Nara, who became the heads of one of Japan's greatest schools of swordsmanship, Yagyū Shinkage-ryū. The Yagyū were also Kenjutsu teachers to the Tokugawa shōgun and descendant of the famous Taira clan, hailing from prestigious Imperial Lineage with the Kabane rank of Ason.

Yagyū Muneyoshi (1527–1606), the first famous Yagyū swordsman, fought for a number of different lords before meeting Tokugawa Ieyasu, the first Tokugawa shōgun. In 1563, he was defeated by the swordsman Kamiizumi Nobutsuna, praised as one of the very few Kensei throughout Japan. Humbled by his defeat, Muneyoshi became Nobutsuna's disciple, and was later named his successor, founding the Yagyū Shinkage-ryū school of swordsmanship.

In 1594, Muneyoshi was invited to Tokugawa Ieyasu's mansion in Kyoto, where he provided such an impressive display of sword skills that Ieyasu asked that the Yagyū become sword instructors to the Tokugawa clan. Among other things, Muneyoshi demonstrated Shinkage-ryū techniques of sword catching on Ieyasu himself. Muneyoshi suggested that his son Munenori be Ieyasu's teacher; Muneyoshi then retired from swordsmanship, and died in 1606, by which time Ieyasu had become shōgun. It was at this time also that the Yagyū swordsmanship school split in two, with Munenori and his nephew Toshiyoshi each becoming the hereditary heads of the Owari and Edo schools of Yagyū Shinkage-ryū.

The Nara area bears many memorials to the Yagyū family, and their family graveyard lies on the grounds of the Hōtoku-ji where the clan's main bastion Yagyū Castle was. On the grounds is a rock called Ittō-seki, which Muneyoshi is supposed to have cut in half with his sword (but was probably split by lightning).

The mon (crest) of the Yagyū family was a wide-brimmed black kasa with ties, called a yagyūgasa.

== Notable members of the Yagyū family ==
- Yagyū Muneyoshi (1527–1606)- founder of the swordsmanship school and first of the family to earn significant power and prestige.
  - Yagyū Toshikatsu (柳生厳勝) (?–?) – the eldest son of Muneyoshi and father of Toshiyoshi.
    - Yagyū Toshiyoshi - head of the Owari branch of the swordsmanship school, which served the junior branch of the Tokugawa family, based in Nagoya.
  - Yagyū Tajima-no-kami Taira-no-Munenori (1571–1646) – first swordsmanship sensei to the Tokugawa, and head of the Edo branch of the swordsmanship school.
    - Yagyū Jūbē Taira-no-Mitsutoshi (c. 1607–1650) – one of the most famous and romanticized samurai in history, Jūbē was the head of the Edo branch of the swordsmanship school and instructor to shōgun Tokugawa Hidetada. Although very strong, talented and known throughout the land because of his social status, it seems Jūbē didn't like his job. In training, he struck Hidetada with his boken instead of stopping his wooden blade before contact, since it was the custom among swordsmen from the same Dōjō. For someone else, it would have been preposterous, but it was Jūbē's job to do as he thought fit. Thus, Yagyū Jūbē got fired, and history almost lost his tracks. Because he was also the heir of Munenori as a Daimyō, Jūbē could not be condemned to Seppuku, neither just become a wandering Rōnin, so is thought to have played a role in the Bakufu's secret police, and the reason why he was so romanticized.
    - Yagyū Samon Taira-no-Tomonori – one of two younger brothers to Jūbē, he replaced his elder as the Shōgun's training partner after he got fired, but Samon died of illness some years later.
    - Yagyū Munefuyu - among the 3 sons of Munenori, Munefuyu was the less gifted in martial arts, he is also remembered as a womanizer and a Noh amateur. A kōan says how he became far stronger than the average swordsman by staying always alert with Zanshin, always prepare to fight. Despite that, he was defeated in a single strike by Yagyū Renya in an official contest.
- Yagyū Hyōgonosuke Taira-no-Toshitoshi – 3rd Sōke of Owari Yagyū line. Beloved grandchild of Sekishūsai, his gifts in martial arts allowed him to inherit Shinkage-ryū instead of his uncle Munenori, the Shōgun's own instructor.
  - Yagyū Renya Taira-no-Toshikane (a.k.a. Yagyū Renyasai) – 5th Sōke of the Owari Yagyū, very famous in his time as a child prodigy, and both a master of the pen and the sword (Bunbu Ryōdō). Renya and his father slightly modified the teachings of Yagyū Shinkage-ryū to take into account the change in warfare, caused by the fact samurai almost no longer fought in armours or in battle, but mainly in duels with civilian clothes : this was called Tsuttattaru Mi (Heihō without Armor). In the Edo period, Renya was also very famous for having kill in one stroke of his wakizashi someone who attacked him in the night. The so-called wakizashi was a blade of peculiar design forged by famous Japanese swordsmith Hata Mitsuyo, because of this, the blade was nicknamed Onibōchō (Oni kitchen knife).
- Yagyū Kōichi Taira-no-Toshinobu, Sōke (headmaster) of Yagyū Shinkage-ryū since 2006, from the main line of Owari Yagyū.

*Each change in ranking in this list indicates a father-son relationship (a change in generation).
