= Jūshirō Konoe =

Japanese actor (1914–1977)

- Born: April 10, 1914; Nagaoka, Niigata
- Died: May 24, 1977 (aged 63)
- Occupation: Jidaigeki actor
- Notable work: Chiheisen, Ôzora no isho, Kessen

Jūshirō Konoe (近衛 十四郎, Konoe Jūshirō; 10 April 1914 – 24 May 1977) was a Japanese jidaigeki actor. He was born Toraichi Meguro in Nagaoka, Niigata. Debuting at Ajia Eiga in 1934, Konoe appeared in jidaigeki at Daito Eiga, Shochiku, and Toei, the latter having him star in a popular series about Yagyu Jubei. Konoe was known for his dazzling swordplay and appeared in over 200 movies and TV dramas. He retired in 1973 due to his worsening diabetes.

Konoe's sons Hiroki Matsukata and Yūki Meguro are actors.

== Filmography ==
List of acting performances in film and television

Year	Title	Japanese	Romanization	Role	Notes
1939			Chiheisen		
1941			Ôzora no isho		
1943	The Decisive Battle		Kessen		
1953			Senkan Yamato		
1955			Gokumonchô		
1956			Rindo garasu		
1956			Kitsune kago		
1956	Five Patriots of Kyoto		Kyoraku gonin otoko		
1957			Rônin-gai	Gen'nai Aramaki	
1957			Jirochô gaiden: Ishimatsu to oiwake sangorô		
1959			Yagyu tabi nikki: Tenchi muso ken	Yagyu Jubei	
1959			Edo yumin den		
1960			Rônin ichiba - Asayake tengu	Isuke Asaoka	
1960			Tenpô rokkasen - Jigoku no hanamichi	Seizô Moritaya	
1960			Suronin hyakuman-goku		
1960			Jirochô kesshôki: Fuji mitôge no taiketsu		
1961		赤穂浪士	Akō rōshi	Ikkaku Shimizu	
1961			Gokai senryo yari		
1961	The Ghost Story of Oiwa's Spirit		Kaidan Oiwa no borei		
1961	Law in Ghost Island		Yurei-jima no okite		
1961	Fighting Daimyo		Tekka daimyo		
1962			Hanagasa dochu		
1962			Kisaragi musô ken	Tekkan Gamô	
1962			Akai kage-bôshi	Hanzô Hattori	
1962			Inazuma to uge no kettô		
1963	Seventeen Ninja			Maguro Saiga	
1963			Jirochô sangokushi dainibu		
1963	Blood and Sand		Chi to suna no kettô		
1964			Ninja gari	Wadakuro	
1964			Bakuto tai tekiya		
1964			Shafu yukyoden - kenka tatsu		
1965			Taking The Castle	Akaza	
1965			Mondonosuke Sanban Shobu	Yajuro	
1965-1972			Tsuronin Tsukikage Hyogo		TV series
1966			Nihon daikyôkaku	Gisaburo Sakurai	
1967	Zatoichi Challenged	座頭市血煙り街道	Zatōichi chikemurikaidō	Tajuro Akazuka	
1968			Ah kaiten tokubetsu kogetikai		
1969			Bakuto Ichidai Chimatsuri Fudo	Kojiro	
1971			Boryokudan sai buso		
1972	Trapped, the Crimson Bat		Mekurano Oichi jigokuhada	Hanbei	
1974	Unmeitōge	運命峠		Yagyū Munenori	TV series
