= Jigokudani Stone Buddhas =

- 地獄谷石窟仏 (Japanese)
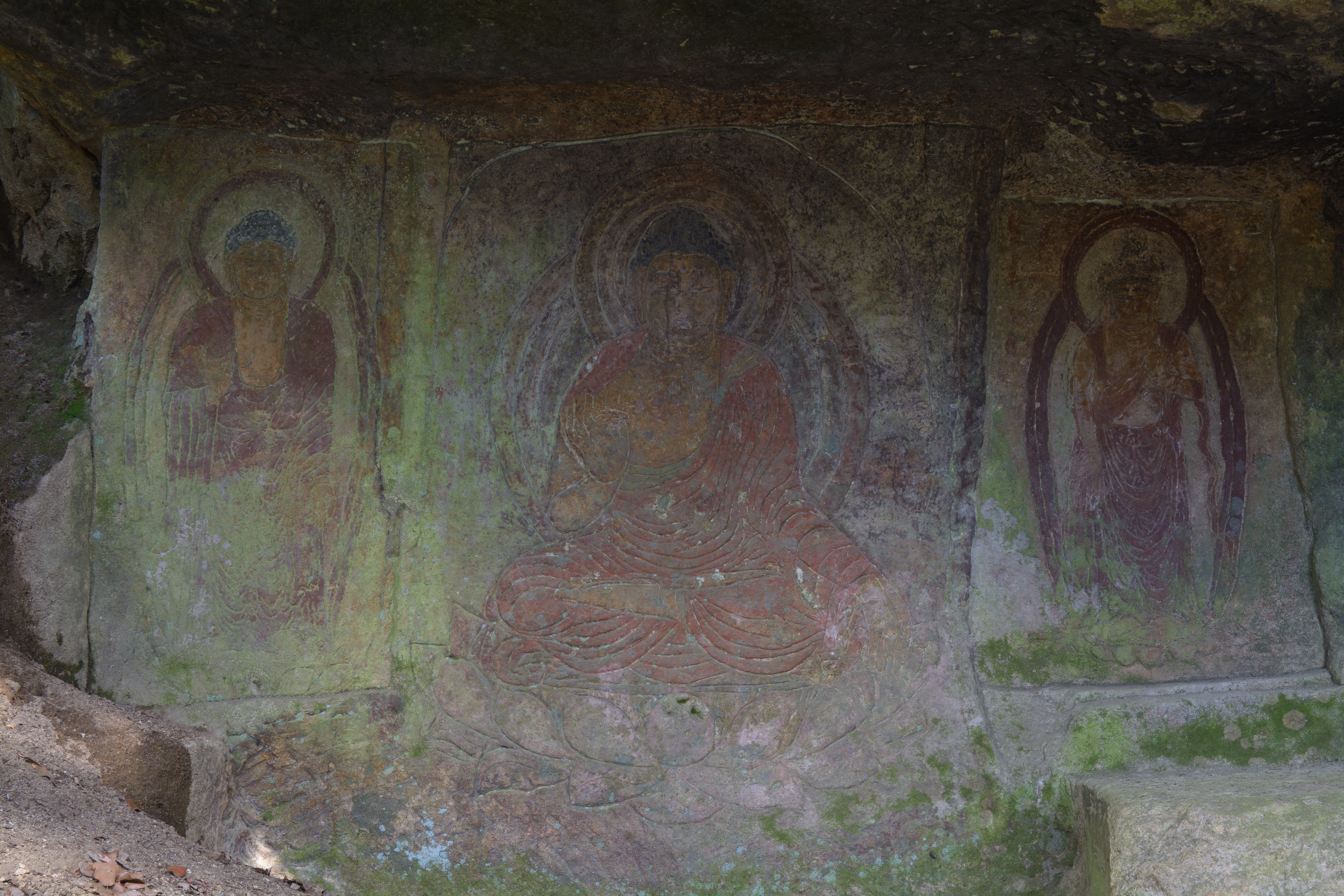
- Jigokudani Stone Buddhas

- Jigokudani Stone Buddhas Jigokudani Stone Buddhas (Japan)
- Interactive map of Jigokudani Stone Buddhas
- 34°40′28″N 135°52′38″E
- Periods: Nara to Heian period
- Location: Nara, Nara, Japan
- Region: Kansai region

Jigokudani Stone Buddhas (地獄谷石窟仏, Jigokudani sekkutsu butsu) is a group of Buddhist statues carved in bas-relief into a tuff cliff in the Takabatake neighborhood of the city of Nara, Nara Prefecture in the Kansai region, Japan. It is one of the stone Buddhas scattered along the Yagyū Kaidō, and ancient road connecting Heijō-kyō with the Yagyū valley and Iga Province. It was designated as a National Historic Sites of Japan in 1924. It is also known as the Shonin Cave (聖人窟)

== Overview ==
The term magaibutsu (磨崖仏) refers to a Buddhist figure carved directly into a natural rock faces or cliffside. The Jigokudani Stone Buddhas are located in a national forest several hundred meters southeast of the Kasugayama Stone Buddhas, which has a separate National Historic Site designation. The statues are carved into a niche in a southwest-facing tuff rock wall. The niche has an opening of 3.9 meters, a depth of 2.9 meters, and a height of 2.4 meter, and contains six Buddha statues carved into the back and both side walls. The back wall is 1.7 meters high, with a central frame of 1.7 by 1.12 meters, and a seated Shaka Nyōrai Buddha statue in a cross-legged position on a double lotus throne. The statue appears to have been painted and traces of gold leaf remain. To the left of the main Buddha statue is a statue of Yakushi Nyōrai with a double circular halo, and on the right side is a standing image of Jūichimen Kannon. On the right wall is an image of Nyōirin Kannon and on the right wall are images of Amida Nyōrai and a Senjū Kannon.

The carving date from the late Nara period to early Heian period, except for the Jūichimen Kannon, which was a later Muromachi period addition. There is an unsubstantiated legend that the site was a quarry which supplied the material for the foundation stones for the buildings at Tōdai-ji. The site is approximately four kilometers by mountain trail southeast of Tōdai-ji, or 9.2 kilometers (24 minutes) by car.

== See also ==
- List of Historic Sites of Japan (Nara)
