= Taking The Castle =

- Film poster
- Directed by: Toshio Masuda
- Screenplay by: Toshio Masuda; Keiichiro Ryu
- Based on: Shiro wo Toru Hanashi by Shōtarō Ikenami
- Starring: Yūjirō Ishihara; Minoru Chiaki; Tamao Nakamura; Nobuo Kaneko; Chieko Matsubara; Tatsuya Fuji; Kamatari Fujiwara; Jūshirō Konoe
- Music by: Toshiro Mayuzumi
- Distributed by: Nikkatsu
- Release date: March 6, 1965 (Japan)
- Running time: 136 minutes
- Country: Japan
- Language: Japanese

Taking The Castle (Japanese: 城取り), also known as Shirotori, is a 1965 Japanese jidaigeki film directed by Toshio Masuda. The film was the first production to be released from Yūjirō Ishihara's company Ishihara Promotion.

It is based on Shōtarō Ikenami's novel Shiro wo Toru Hanashi.

== Plot ==
At the end of the Sengoku period, While other Daimyo are joining Tokugawa Ieyasu's army one after another. but only Uesugi clan is brave enough stand in Ieyasu's way. Kuruma Touzo is a ronin who left Kobayakawa Hideaki. He is impressed by the Uesugi clan's courage and tries to help. His target is Tamonyama castle under construction by Date clan.

== Cast ==
Actor	Role
Yūjirō Ishihara	Kuruma Touzo
Minoru Chiaki	Tawara Sanai
Tamao Nakamura	Osen
Chieko Matsubara	Mahime
Tatsuya Fuji	Young Samurai
Taketoshi Naito	Unsui
Kenji Imai	Shibuya Tenzen
Eiji Gō	Tomita Ippachi
Gannosuke Ashiya	Shirakonaya Chojiro
Kamatari Fujiwara	Kanbei
Osamu Takizawa	Naoe Kanetsugu
Jūshirō Konoe	Akaza
