= Kasugayama Stone Buddhas =

- 春日山石窟仏 (Japanese)
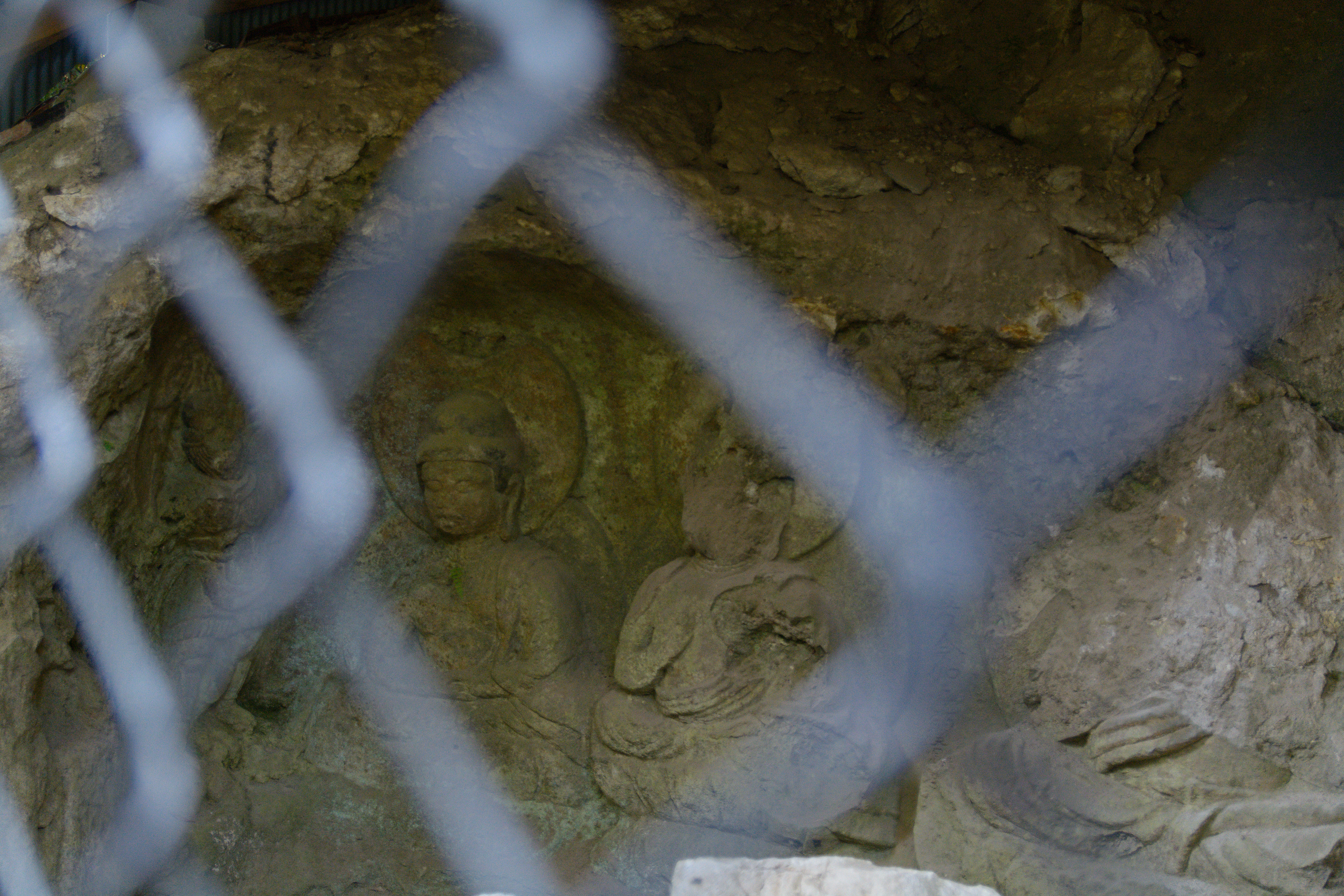
- Kasugayama Stone Buddhas , western cave

- Kasugayama Stone Buddhas Kasugayama Stone Buddhas (Japan)
- Interactive map of Kasugayama Stone Buddhas
- 34°40′36″N 135°52′25″E
- Periods: Nara to Heian period
- Location: Nara, Nara, Japan
- Region: Kansai region

Kasugayama Stone Buddhas (春日山石窟仏, Kasugayama sekkutsu butsu) is a group of Buddhist statues carved in bas-relief into a tuff cliff in the Takabatake neighborhood of the city of Nara, Nara Prefecture in the Kansai region, Japan. It is one of the stone Buddhas scattered along the Yagyū Kaidō, and ancient road connecting Heijō-kyō with the Yagyū valley and Iga Province. It was designated as a National Historic Sites of Japan in 1924. It is also known as the Hole Buddhas (穴仏)。

== Overview ==
The term magaibutsu (磨崖仏) refers to a Buddhist figure carved directly into a natural rock faces or cliffside. The Kasugayama Stone Buddhas are located in a national forest several hundred meters northeast of the Jigokudani Stone Buddhas, which has a separate National Historic Site designation. The site consists of two artificial caves, one east and one west, carved into a south-facing tuff rock wall. The Buddha statues carved into the inner walls. The eastern cave is centered on exoteric Buddhism, while the western cave is centered on esoteric Buddhism. The eastern cave has an opening of 4.7 meters, a depth of 3 meters, a back wall width of 4 meters, and a height of just over 2 meters. Four statues of Jizo Bosatsu are carved on the west wall, and three statues of Kannon Bosatsu are carved on the east wall. In the center of the cave is a 2-meter-tall (6.6 ft) stone pillar that is thought to have been built as a multi-tiered pagoda, and is caved with four Buddhas, one on each side. These are presumably Yakushi Nyorai on the east, Shaka Nyorai on the south, Amida Nyōrai on the west, and Miroku Bosatsu on the north. The western cave has an opening of 4.7 meters and a depth of 2.3 meter. A statue of Tamonten, stepping on a demon and wearing a flame halo, is carved in the corner of the west wall. Next to it is a seated statue of Amida Nyorai, and next to it is a statue of Fukujyoju Nyorai and a statue of Dainichi Nyorai. The seated Buddha statues are presumed to represent the Five Vajrayana Buddhas, but two of the five have been lost.

The west cave is thought to be a work from the late Heian period (mid-12th century) because it has the inscriptions of 1155 and 1157. In 1924, a roof was erected to protect the statues from weathering, and preservation and maintenance were carried out. The surrounding Kasugayama Primeval Forest was registered as a World Heritage Site in 1998 as part of the Historic Monuments of Ancient Nara.

The site is approximately four kilometers by mountain trail southeast of Tōdai-ji, or 9.2 kilometers (24 minutes) by car.

== See also ==
- List of Historic Sites of Japan (Nara)
