= Yagyū Castle =

Castle in Tokyo, Japan

- 柳生城
- Nara, Nara Prefecture, Japan

Site information
- Type: Hirayamajiro-style castle
- Owner: Yagyū clan
- Condition: ruins

Location
- Coordinates: 34°43′52″N 135°57′19″E

Site history
- Built: Nanboku-chō period
- Built by: Yagyū clan
- Demolished: Unknown
- Battles/wars: Siege of Yagyū Castle

Garrison information
- Past commanders: Yagyū Munetoshi

Yagyū Castle (柳生城, Yagyū-jō) is the remains of a castle structure in Nara, Nara Prefecture.

Yagyū castle was constructed by the Yagyū clan in the Nanboku-chō period and became a home castle of the Yagyū clan. In 1544, the castle was attacked by Tsutsui Junkei's force and defeated. Later, Yagyū clan was approved as the main domain of Yagyū in Yamato by Oda Nobunaga. In 1590, Toyotomi Hideyoshi seized the territories of the Yagyū clan.

In the Battle of Sekigahara, Yagyū clan joined the West squad and after the battle Yagyū clan was given their old territory by Tokugawa Ieyasu. In 1643, Yagyū Munenori built clan's new residence called Yagyū Jinya near the castle.

Hotoku-ji Temple and Masaki school of swordplay are on site.
