= Zatoichi Challenged =

1967 film

Japanese name
- Kanji: 座頭市血煙り街道
Transcriptions
- Revised Hepburn: Zatōichi chikemurikaidō
- Directed by: Kenji Misumi
- Written by: Ryozo Kasahara
- Based on: Zatoichi by Kan Shimozawa
- Produced by: Ikuo Kubodera
- Starring: Shintaro Katsu; Jushiro Konoe; Miwa Takada; Yukiji Asaoka
- Cinematography: Chikashi Makiura
- Edited by: Toshio Taniguchi
- Music by: Akira Ifukube
- Production company: Daiei Studios
- Release date: 30 December 1967 (Japan)
- Running time: 87 minutes
- Country: Japan
- Language: Japanese

Zatoichi Challenged (座頭市血煙り街道, Zatōichi chikemurikaidō) is a 1967 Japanese chambara film directed by Kenji Misumi and starring Shintaro Katsu as the blind masseur Zatoichi. The film was originally released by the Daiei Motion Picture Company (later acquired by Kadokawa Pictures).

Zatoichi Challenged is the seventeenth entry in the 26-part film series dedicated to the character of Zatoichi. The series, known for its blend of action, drama, and social commentary, has become iconic in Japanese cinema and has garnered a significant following worldwide.

== Plot ==
Zatoichi (Shintaro Katsu), the blind swordsman and masseur, checks into an inn where he shares a room with an ill woman and her young son, Ryota. Before the woman dies, she entrusts Zatoichi with the task of taking her son to his father, an artist living in the town of Maebara. Moved by her dying wish, Zatoichi agrees to help the boy, embarking on a journey that tests his skill and compassion.

As Zatoichi and Ryota travel together, they encounter various obstacles and adversaries. They hitch a ride with a traveling performance troupe, which provides temporary refuge but also brings new dangers. Along the way, Zatoichi's path crosses with corrupt officials and criminal gangs who threaten their mission.

In Maebara, Zatoichi discovers that Ryota's father is being held captive by a local yakuza boss, Boss Gonzo (Asao Koike). Gonzo has forced the artist to create pornography, exploiting his talents for illegal profit. Determined to free Ryota's father, Zatoichi confronts the yakuza, leading to several intense and action-packed encounters.

The climax of the film takes place during a dramatic snowfall, where Zatoichi must face his old friend Akazuka (Jushiro Konoe), a skilled samurai. Akazuka, torn between his duty and his friendship with Zatoichi, is ordered to kill Ryota's father to silence him. In a poignant and emotionally charged duel, Zatoichi wounds Akazuka, but then throws his own sword to save Ryota's father from a servant sent to kill him. With Zatoichi unarmed and defenseless, his friend admits defeat and leaves, trailing blood in the snow.

Despite the odds, Zatoichi successfully reunites Ryota with his father, fulfilling the promise he made to the boy's dying mother. Zatoichi continues his solitary journey, having once again acted as a protector and avenger for those in need.

== Cast ==
- Shintaro Katsu as Zatoichi
- Jushiro Konoe as Akazuka
- Miwa Takada as Omitsu
- Yukiji Asaoka as Tomoe
- Mikiko Tsubouchi as Osen
- Mie Nakao as Miyuki
- Takao Ito as Shokichi
- Midori Isomura as Omine
- Eitaro Ozawa as Torikoshi
- Asao Koike as Boss Gonzo

== Reception ==
=== Critical response ===
J. Doyle Wallis, in a review for DVD Talk, commented on the film's strengths and weaknesses: "While it had the great Kenji Misumi, one of samurai cinema's greats and a personal favorite director of mine, behind the camera, not every film in such a long film cycle can be perfect. Unfortunately, this is one of the weaker films. Misumi's direction is still quite good and his signature perfect framing is as fantastic as it ever was, particularly in the great finale which features one of Ichi's longest duels. Katsu is also, as he always was, great. The man could act with any part of his body and he displays some of the finest ear and foot acting you're likely to see. But, while entertaining enough for Katsu and Misumi's inherent skill, the film suffers from a slapdash script and that damn annoying kid factor. The series' one major fault was its lack of development and reliance on formula. While usually that formula is a winner, here it just feels a tad tired."

== Adaptation ==
The 1989 American samurai-action film Blind Fury, starring Rutger Hauer, is a loose modernization of Zatoichi Challenged. This adaptation transplants the story to a contemporary setting while retaining the core themes and character dynamics of the original film.

== Cultural Impact ==
The Zatoichi series has had a lasting impact on both Japanese and global cinema. Shintaro Katsu's portrayal of the blind swordsman has become iconic, influencing numerous films, television shows, and even video games. The series is praised for its complex characters, intricate fight choreography, and the way it addresses social issues such as justice, disability, and honor.
