= Shinsen Man'yōshū =

Japanese anthology of waka and kanshi

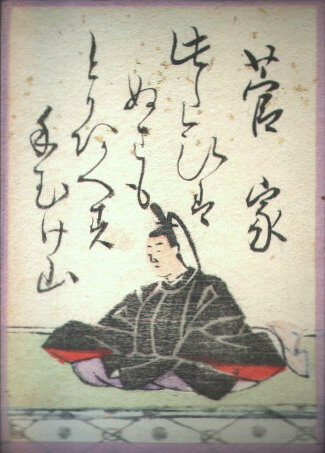
Sugawara no Michizane, to whom the compilation is traditionally attributed

The Shinsen Man'yōshū (新撰万葉集; "Newly Compiled Man'yōshū"), also called the Kanke Man'yōshū (菅家万葉集; "Sugawara no Michizane's Man'yōshū"), is a privately compiled anthology of waka and kanshi compiled between 893 and 913.

== Compilation and date ==
The work is in two volumes, the first having been compiled in 893 and the second being added in 913. Its compilation is traditionally attributed to the great scholar and kanshi poet Sugawara no Michizane, but other theories have been proposed. The attribution was first made in the eleventh century, and is today accepted by most scholars. (Note: Hitaku Kyūsojin, Taira Takano and Hiroshi Yamaguchi accept the attribution, but Tōru Asami said it was a baseless tradition, with Helen Craig McCullough stating that the poetry's impersonality makes verification impossible.) Even if Michizane wrote the poetry himself, he could not have composed the preface to the second volume, which is dated 913, ten years after Michizane's death.

== Style ==
The text consists of alternating waka and kanshi on the same theme. The waka are written in Man'yōgana, similarly to the Man'yōshū.

== Bibliography ==
- Keene, Donald (1999). A History of Japanese Literature, Vol. 1: Seeds in the Heart — Japanese Literature from Earliest Times to the Late Sixteenth Century. New York: Columbia University Press. ISBN 978-0-231-11441-7.
