= A Hereditary Book on the Art of War =

1632 book by Yagyū Munenori

A Hereditary Book on the Art of War or Heihō kadensho (兵法家伝書), is a Japanese text on the theory and practice of swordsmanship and strategy, written by the samurai Yagyū Munenori in 1632. Alongside Miyamoto Musashi's The Book of Five Rings, it is one of the preeminent treatises on warfare in classical Japanese literature. Similar to Musashi's contemporary work, Munenori's has garnered appeal for its applicability beyond the warrior paradigm.

== Content ==
The book is divided into three chapters.“The Killing Sword” addresses force as a remedy to disorder and violence. The following “Life-Giving Sword” considers the role of prevention in conflict. Finally, in “No Sword”, the merits of using the environment's resources to one's fullest advantage are explored.

No Sword

This chapter discusses strategies like how higher ground can give an advantage over your foes and how to use inclement weather to your advantage. There are several mentions of how uneven terrain can make all the difference in battle and how a simple thing like a loose stone can turn the table on your enemy.
