= Ako Controversy =

Japanese political controversy

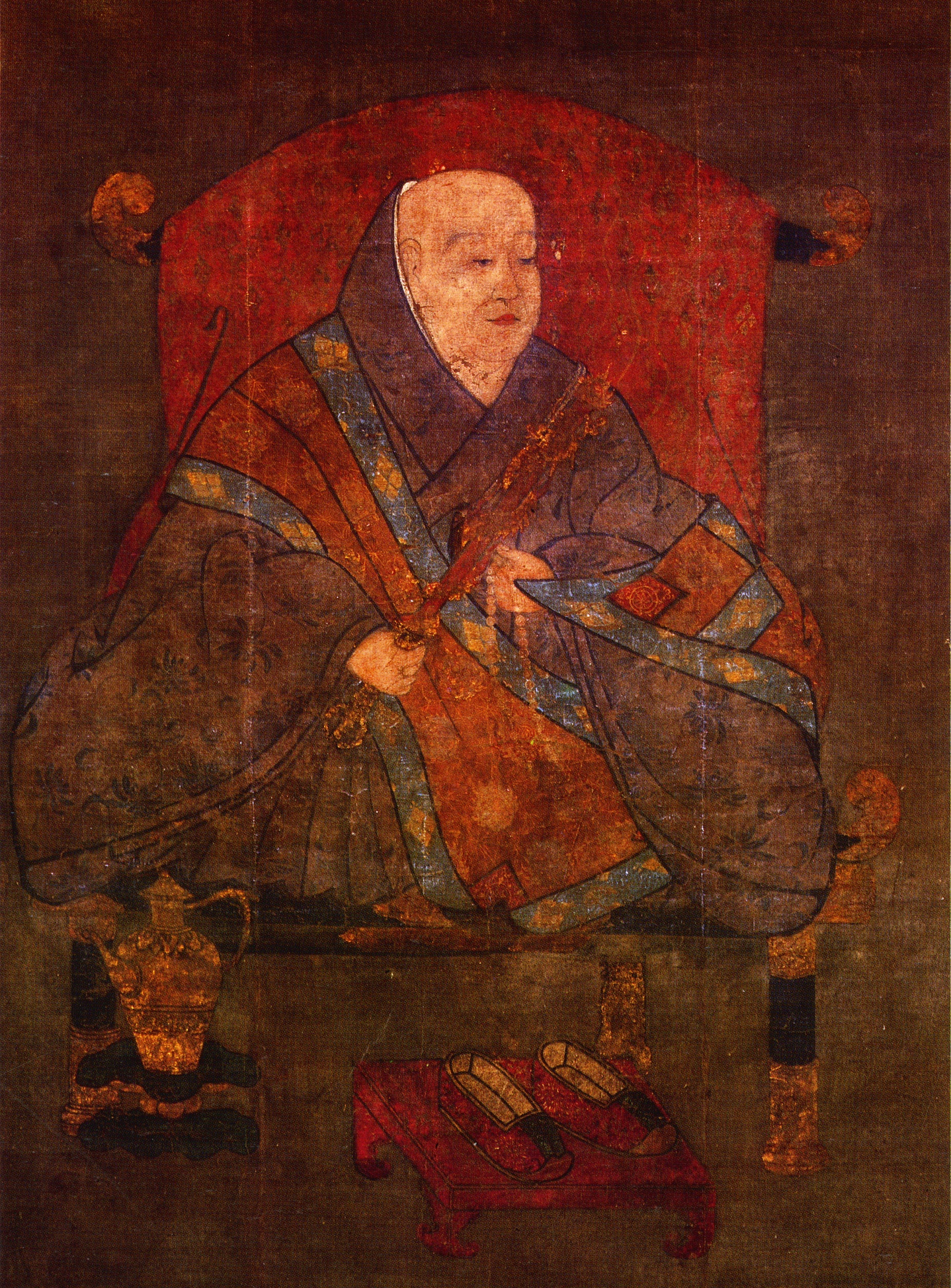
Portrait of Emperor Uda

The Ako Controversy (阿衡の紛議) or Ako Incident (阿衡事件) was a political controversy that occurred in the early Heian period of Japanese history.

== History ==
On November 21, 887 AD, the newly enthroned Emperor Uda issued an imperial edict assigning Fujiwara no Mototsune as Kanpaku (Chief Imperial Advisor). However, the Emperor, together with Tachibana no Hiromi, then issued a second edict equating "Kanpaku" with "Ako". Ako, which comes from the Chinese title a-heng, was said to be just a title without any official duties, which would effectively dismiss Mototsune from the government. This imperial edict triggered the Ako Controversy.

In April 888 AD, Emperor Uda ordered experts to make sure that Ako meant not performing any official duties. But the experts failed to do so, afraid of the Fujiwara house's influence. In June, the Emperor decided to cancel the imperial edicts, which is considered the "first real setback of his career". The controversy ended with Fujiwara no Mototsune being made kanpaku and the term "Ako" removed from the imperial edict.
