= Yagyū Munetoshi =

Japanese samurai

- Born: Yagyū Shinsuke Munetoshi; 1527; Yagyū, Yamato Province
- Died: May 25, 1606 (aged 76–77); Yagyū, Yamato Province
- Native name: 柳生 宗厳
- Other names: Sekishūsai, Yagyū Shinzaemon, Yagyū Tajima-no-Kami, Yagyū Muneyoshi
- Style: Shinkage-ryū
- Teacher: Kamiizumi Nobutsuna

Other information
- Notable students: Yagyū Munenori, Yagyū Toshitoshi, Takeda Ujikatsu

Yagyū Sekishūsai Taira-no-Munetoshi (柳生石舟斎平宗厳 1527 – May 25, 1606) was a samurai in Japan's Sengoku period famous for mastering the Shinkage-ryū school of combat, and introducing it to the Tokugawa clan. He was also known as Shinsuke, or Shinzaemon.

== Early life ==
Munetoshi was born Yagyū Shinsuke in 1529 in Yagyū village (present day Yagyū, Nara) in Yamato Province. His father, Ietoshi, was a minor landed lord. When Munetoshi was 12, Ietoshi joined a general named Kisawa Nagamasa in contesting the growing power of the warlord Miyoshi Chōkei. However, Kisawa was killed in battle, and the Yagyū found themselves on the defensive. With over half of Yamato Province under his control, Miyoshi left the rest of the conquest to his lieutenant, Tsutsui Junshō.

The Tsutsui and the Yagyū had feuded previously, and Junshō wasted no time. In 1544 he attacked the Yagyū at Yagyū Castle with some 10,000 men. According to the Tamon-in Nikki, a chronicle of the Kōfuku-ji temple, at first the Yagyū were caught by surprise, but Ietoshi rallied his troops for a defensive battle. Munetoshi, a young man of 15, ably led a small troop of his own. The Tsutsui troops surrounded the castle, burned the surrounding houses and villages, took control of the outer castle and cut off the water supply, but the main castle still held out. The Yagyū held out for three days, but they were greatly outnumbered, and had no choice but to capitulate, and submit to the Tsutsui.

The Yagyū served the Tsutsui for eight years. Munetoshi studied the martial and liberal arts, becoming proficient with the spear and sword, as well as studying Confucianism, Zen Buddhism, and Shingon Buddhism. Munetoshi soon gained notice as an able warrior and commander, and as many of orders were sent by Tsutsui to him, a young man in his 20s, as were sent to his father, still an active lord in his 50s. One message sent by Junshō's son Fujikatsu to Ietoshi singles out Munetoshi in particular for praise.

In 1559, the warlord Matsunaga Hisahide decided to attack the Tsutsui and take control of Yamato Province. He sent a message to Munetoshi promising to restore their old lands and position to the Yagyū in exchange for their service. The Tsutsui were overthrown, and the Yagyū grew prominent under Matsunaga. In particular, Matsunaga gave Munetoshi a citation for valor for his performance in a battle at To'unomine. Matsunaga's attempt to take the mountain was repulsed, and Munetoshi fought in the rearguard as the army retreated. He was wounded, but fighting with a spear he killed several of the enemy. Munetoshi almost did not survive the battle, but a retainer named Matsuda Muneshige sacrificed his life to save Munetoshi's. Munetoshi would later make mention of his extreme gratitude when he gave a Shinkage-ryū license to Muneshige's son Genjirō.

It is not entirely clear what school of combat Munetoshi studied, or who his teachers were. An Owari Yagyū family record suggests that he studied Shintō-ryū under a man named Kantori Shinjūrō. But "Kantori" may simply be a misreading of kanji meant to read “Katori”, thus signifying "Katori Shintō-ryū". An Edo Yagyū family record suggests that he studied Toda-ryū, a branch of Chūjō-ryū. All family records and Munetoshi's own surviving writings suggest that he was an enthusiastic student of the military arts from a young age, before he met Kamiizumi Hidetsuna.

== Encounter with Kamiizumi Hidetsuna ==
In 1564, Kamiizumi Ise-no-kami Hidetsuna was travelling to Kyoto with his student and nephew Hikita Bungorō and his long-time student Suzuki Ihaku. While stopping in Ise Province, the group asked the governor, Kitabatake Tomonori, if he knew of any capable samurai nearby interested in a friendly match. Kitabatake recommended Munetoshi and Munetoshi's friend Kakuzenbō In’ei, a monk and spearsman of the Hōzōin temple. Hidetsuna agreed, and a messenger was sent on ahead to Hōzōin temple to contact the two men.

Munetoshi agreed, and met Hidetsuna at Hōzōin. Accounts differ on the specifics of the match: according to the Edo Yagyū family record Kyū Yagyū-hanki, Munetoshi faced Hikita Bungoro and was roundly beaten with a fukuro-shinai. An account by Munetoshi's great-great-grandson Toshinobu says that Munetoshi faced Suzuki Ihaku three times. Based on family documents and oral history, Yagyū Toshinaga suggested that Munetoshi's opponent was Hidetsuna himself in three matches over three days. In any event, the common point of all the accounts is that Munetoshi lost, and became Hidetsuna's disciple.

Munetoshi invited Hidetsuna to his land in Yagyū Village, where they trained for the better part of a year. Hidetsuna then went on to Kyoto, giving Munetoshi an assignment. He asked him to research the concept of Mutō-dori; facing an armed opponent while unarmed. While Hidetsuna was away Munetoshi devoted himself to this study, and upon Hidetsuna's return he successfully demonstrated it on Suzuki Ihaku. Hidetsuna, pleased by this innovation, gave Munetoshi an inka-jō, signifying the highest attainment in Shinkage-ryū and permission to teach it. A year later, Hidetsuna gave Munetoshi the Kage-mokuroku, a selection of four scrolls detailing the kata of Shinkage-ryū with commentary and drawings by Hidetsuna himself.

In the Yagyū Kaken, the Yagyū family constitution, Munetoshi wrote that he had loved the military arts since he was a youth, and studied many ryū, but did not know victory until he met Kamiizumi Hidetsuna. Munetoshi's service to Matsunaga, and later to Oda Nobunaga would keep him busy following Hidetsuna's visit in 1567, Munetoshi and Hidetsuna both found themselves living and working in Kyoto in the waning years of the Ashikaga Shogunate, from 1570 to 1572. In 1572 Hidetsuna traveled to Yagyū Village for the last time, staying there an indefinite length of time before heading east to Kōzuke Province, where he was last seen in 1577.

== Career as a general ==
Munetoshi served Matsunaga with distinction. The battle at To'unomine, for which Munetoshi received a citation of valor, was either just before his encounter with Hidetsuna or shortly after. In 1568, Oda Nobunaga entered Yamato Province with overwhelming force and subjugated the Matsunaga and Tsutsui, ending their skirmishing. It is likely that around this time Ietoshi retired, and passed on the leadership of the Yagyū to Munetoshi. Nobunaga ordered Munetoshi to go to Kyoto and attend to the new Shōgun Ashikaga Yoshiaki.

With the passing of a few years, however, Yoshiaki began forming alliances to overthrow Nobunaga, among them the Yagyū's old lord and present commander Matsunaga Hisahide and the warlord Takeda Shingen. In 1571, attempting to secure control once more over Yamato Province, Matsunaga sent the Yagyū in an attack against Tsutsui Junkei at Tatsuichi, a town in Nara. The attack was a total failure, and in the course of the battle Munetoshi's oldest son, Toshikatsu, was shot in the hip. This compounded an earlier injury he had received in his first battle, and made him an invalid for life.

Yoshiaki's coalition made its move against Nobunaga in 1573, but despite early success the death of Takeda Shingen weakened it. Nobunaga drove Yoshiaki out of Kyoto in August, and Matsunaga rejoined Nobunaga to fight the other members of the coalition. It is likely that Munetoshi took part in these battles. However, by 1577 Matsunaga again turned on Nobunaga, who then finally defeated his wayward vassal. It is not clear when, but around this time Munetoshi withdrew from the world of battle, and secluded himself in Yagyū Village.

== Seclusion and focus on Shinkage-ryū ==
Sometime in the late 1570s, Munetoshi gave up all aspirations of being a general or warlord, and retired to Yagyū Village, where he devoted himself to teaching and training in Shinkage-ryū. It is not exactly clear why, as he was only in his late-40s. The death of Hidetsuna, his teacher, around this time may have been a factor, as well as the fall of the Ashikaga and Matsunaga. Poetry that Munetoshi wrote during this time express doubt and a lack of confidence in anything beyond Shinkage-ryū, and even this skill is compared in utility to a "stone boat".

Munetoshi spent most of his time teaching Shinkage-ryū to his sons and other men. Licenses given out by him that date back to 1580 survive today. In 1589 he wrote the Yagyū Kaken 柳生家憲, a memoir and treatise on proper conduct meant for his descendants. In 1593 he became a Buddhist lay priest, taking the name "Sekishūsai Songon". This same year, he wrote the Heihō Hyakka (兵法百歌, "One-hundred Songs of Strategy"), a collection of mostly original poetry on such subjects as the usefulness, training, and goals of the martial arts.

1594 would prove to be an eventful year. Despite his seclusion in Yagyū Village, Munetoshi's prowess in Shinkage-ryū and Mutō-dori was known by Tokugawa Ieyasu, at that time still Toyotomi Hideyoshi’s loyal general. Ieyasu was highly interested in the martial arts, and he arranged for a meeting with Munetoshi at Takagamine, north of Kyoto. Munetoshi brought his fifth son, Munenori, with him to demonstrate. After explaining the philosophy of Shinkage-ryū, they demonstrated some of the kata of the ryū, as well as Mutō-dori. However, Ieyasu wished to see for himself, so he took up a bokutō, a wooden sword, and requested that Munetoshi demonstrate Mutō-dori on him. Munetoshi successfully did so, sending Ieyasu's bokutō flying away and knocking Ieyasu onto his back. Impressed, Ieyasu asked Munetoshi to teach him Shinkage-ryū. Munetoshi refused, citing his advanced age, and recommended his son Munenori. Ieyasu agreed, and signed an oath to learn Shinkage-ryū, and to treat the Yagyū with favor. Munenori went with Ieyasu, and was given the post of hatamoto, or standard bearer.

That same year, a census of the Yamato Province revealed hidden, non-taxed rice fields in Yagyū Village. As punishment, Munetoshi's lands were taken away by Toyotomi Hideyoshi. Munetoshi continued to teach Shinkage-ryū, in particular to his grandson Hyōgonosuke Toshitoshi, and Takeda Ujikatsu, the head of the Konparu-ryū school of Noh theater.

== Final years and death ==
The Yagyū family suffered a major loss in 1597, when Munetoshi's oldest grandson and ostensible heir, Sumitoshi, was killed in battle in Korea. In 1599, Munetoshi wrote out a will. Demonstrating the dire situation his family was in, he ordered that his tea ceremony equipment be sold to pay for his funeral. But Munetoshi would live to see a final reversal of fortune, and his long dedication to Shinkage-ryū finally secure the success of his family for generations. In 1600, the armies of Ishida Mitsunari and Tokugawa Ieyasu began moving against each other to determine who would rule after the death of Toyotomi Hideyoshi. Ieyasu was attempting to put down an uprising by the Uesugi clan in Shimotsuke Province (present-day Tochigi Prefecture) when he learned that Mitsunari was moving against him. He dispatched Munenori back to Yagyū Village, to ask his father to raise forces in the Yamato region. At the age of 71, Munetoshi was too old to lead the forces himself, so Munenori led them to Ieyasu's position, arriving a day before the battle. Ieyasu's army carried the day, and among the rewards given to the Yagyū was the return of their ancestral lands to their control.

Munetoshi's fourth son, Gorōemon Muneaki, had served under Kobayakawa Hideaki until Hideaki's death in 1602. Muneaki became a rōnin, and was taken in by Yokota Muraaki, the chamberlain of Nakamura Kazutada, lord of Yonago. In 1603, Nakamura killed Yokota, believing that the chamberlain was plotting against him. Yokota's family, including Yagyū Muneaki, started an uprising, which was ruthlessly put down. Muneaki fought bravely, reportedly cutting down 18 men before he was shot and killed. He was 35 years old.

In 1604, Munetoshi's grandson, Toshitoshi, left Yagyū Village to serve the great general Kato Kiyomasa. Toshitoshi was in Kiyomasa's service only a year before trouble with older retainers forced him to leave. Toshitoshi used the opportunity to do musha shugyō, testing himself against and learning from different teachers. In 1606, Munetoshi urgently summoned Toshitoshi back to Yagyū Village. When Toshitoshi returned, Munetoshi, now in ill health, bequeathed to his grandson all of his Shinkage-ryū materials, including the license of transmission and illustrated scrolls he received from Hidetsuna. In 1606, Munetoshi died at age 78 in Yagyū Village.

== Legacy ==
After his death, his son Munenori took possession of the family lands in Yagyū Village, and ordered that Hōtokuji Temple be built in Munetoshi's honor. Munenori's son Retsudō was made the chief priest. The temple remains today, on the grounds where Munetoshi's manor once stood.

With the patronage of the Tokugawa family, the Yagyū family was finally secure, enjoying peace and prosperity until the end of the Tokugawa era. Munenori, initially only a hatamoto and sword instructor, became a trusted aide to the third Tokugawa Shōgun, Iemitsu. Yagyū Village and the surrounding area became Yagyū-han, with Munenori as its first lord. Munenori and his son Jūbei were known for their skill with the sword, and they had a number of students, some of whom would go on to found their own styles. Munenori's line is known as the Edo Yagyū.

Munetoshi's oldest son, Toshikatsu, remained in Yagyū Village until his death, his disability preventing him from being employed by a lord. But his sons would go on to become renowned sword instructors in their own right. His youngest, Kenzaemon, became the sword instructor to Date Masumune, the lord of Sendai-han. Toshikatsu's second son, Toshitoshi, eventually became the sword instructor to the Owari Tokugawa, in Nagoya. Toshitoshi's line, the Owari Yagyū, continued to teach and pass down Shinkage-ryū throughout the Edo period, to the present day. The current sōke, Yagyū Kōichi, is a direct 13th generation descendant of Munetoshi via Toshitoshi's line.

== Name ==
Munetoshi is often referred to in popular works as “Muneyoshi”, and likewise his grandsons Jūbei and Hyōgonosuke are referred to as Mitsuyoshi and Toshiyoshi, respectively. However, in the Yagyū family, they are known as Munetoshi, Mitsutoshi, and Toshitoshi. The character 厳 has been passed down in the family since Ietoshi's time, always with the reading “toshi”. In the Edo Yagyū line of Munenori, only Jūbei Mitsutoshi was given the 厳 character, but from the 5th head of the family on, the character 俊 was used, also read “toshi”.

When historians first came across the name 宗厳 they had no way to be sure how the name was read. The only suggestion for pronunciation in Yagyū family records was Songon, the Chinese-reading of the characters, which Munetoshi took upon taking the name “Sekishūsai”. One late 18th century record of family lineages, the Kansei Choshu Shokafu, noted “Muneyoshi” as the pronunciation. In the Daikanwa Jiten, the largest Chinese character dictionary for the Japanese language, 厳 is given kane, tsuyo, and yoshi as possible readings used in names. So in early modern histories, this reading was used. Some books still use it today. However, historian Imamura Yoshio posits that even the kana characters indicating the "Muneyoshi" pronunciation in the Kansei Choshu Shokafu may actually be indicating "Munetoshi". The kana よ (yo) was derived from 与, which also can be read as "to". Starting with the release of Shōden Shinkage-ryū, by Yagyū Toshinaga, in 1955, the Yagyū family pronunciation has become more common than before.

== In legend and fiction ==
Like many other great figures in Japanese history, Munetoshi has become a popular figure in literature, movies, video games and other media, and has accumulated a number of exaggerated tales and legends about him. In Yagyū Village, near the Yagyū family burial ground, is a large rock called Itto-seki, which has been split in half. Though it was most probably split by lightning or earthquake, legend says that Munetoshi cleaved it himself with his sword.

Munetoshi is a prominent character in Eiji Yoshikawa's Musashi, a fictionalized telling of the life of Miyamoto Musashi. In that story a young and still wild Musashi seeks out Munetoshi, seeking to make a name for himself by defeating the famous swordsman. By that time however, Munetoshi is already old and ailing, and instead of dueling, the encounter turns into a learning experience for Musashi, who is awed by the spiritual power of Munetoshi, and makes him aware of his shortcomings as a person. These encounters are also portrayed in the manga series Vagabond, based on Yoshikawa's novel.

In the Onimusha video game series, Munetoshi, by taking the title of Jubei, was the main character in Onimusha 2: Samurai's Destiny. After Nobunaga destroys the Yagyū Village, Jubei goes off on a journey to avenge them. He also appears in Onimusha Blade Warriors and is in hiding in Onimusha 3: Demon Siege. In Onimusha: Dawn of Dreams, he retires and gives the Jubei name to his granddaughter, Akane. He is referred to Sekishusai as a result. His son, Yagyū Munenori became a servant of the evil Toyotomi Hideyoshi, and for this, he sent Akane to kill him.

In the Fatal Fury video game series, the character Jubei Yamada is based on him.

Sonny Chiba plays a fictionalized version of Yagyu Shinzaemon in the 1982 movie Ninja Wars.

In the 2017 video game Nioh, he appears as a side quest boss for unlocking the Sword Mystic Art skills.

In the 2003 Taiga drama series Musashi (based from Eiji Yoshikawa's Musashi), Sekishusai was played by Makoto Fujita.
