= Yagyū Munenori =

Japanese daimyō (1571–1646)

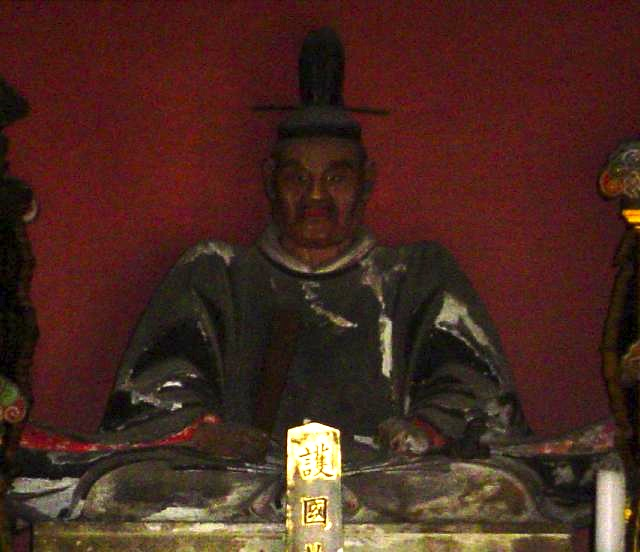
- Born: 1571
- Died: May 11, 1646 (aged 74–75)
- Occupations: Daimyo, martial arts writer, swordsman
- Known for: Yagyū Shinkage-ryū
- Relatives: Yagyū Jūbē Mitsuyoshi (son); Yagyū Munefuyu (son)

Yagyū Munenori (柳生 宗矩; 1571 – May 11, 1646) was a Japanese daimyō, swordsman, and martial arts writer. He founded the Edo branch of Yagyū Shinkage-ryū, which he learned from his father Yagyū "Sekishūsai" Munetoshi, and was one of two official sword styles patronized by the Tokugawa shogunate (the other one being Ittō-ryū).

Munenori began his career in the Tokugawa shogunate as a hatamoto, a direct retainer of the Tokugawa house, and later had his income raised to 10,000 koku, making him a minor fudai daimyō (vassal lord serving the Tokugawa), with landholdings around his ancestral village of Yagyū-zato. He also received the title of Tajima no Kami (但馬守).

== Career ==
Munenori entered the service of Tokugawa Ieyasu at a young age, and was later an instructor of swordsmanship to Ieyasu's son Hidetada. He eventually became one of the primary advisors of the third shōgun, Iemitsu.

Shortly before his death in 1606, Sekishusai passed the leadership of Yagyū Shinkage-ryū to his grandson Toshiyoshi. Following a period of musha shugyō, Toshiyoshi entered the service of a cadet branch of the Tokugawa clan that controlled the Owari province. Toshiyoshi's school was based in Nagoya and came to be called Owari Yagyū-ryū (尾張柳生流), while Munenori's, in Edo, the Tokugawa capital, came to be known as Edo Yagyū-ryū (江戸柳生流). Takenaga Hayato, the founder of the Yagyū Shingan-ryū, was a disciple of Yagyū Munenori and received gokui (secret teachings) of the Yagyū Shinkage-ryū from him.

In about 1632, Munenori completed the Heihō kadensho (A Hereditary Book on the Art of War), a treatise on practical Shinkage-ryū swordsmanship and how it could be applied on a macro level to life and politics. The text remains in print in Japan today, and has been translated a number of times into English.

Munenori's sons, Yagyū Jūbē Mitsuyoshi and Yagyū Munefuyu, were also famous swordsmen.

The essay The Mysterious Record of Immovable Wisdom by Takuan Sōhō was a letter written from Sōhō to Munenori.

== Bibliography ==
- A Hereditary Book on the Art of War (1632)
