= Keiichiro Ryu =

Japanese writer (1923–1989)

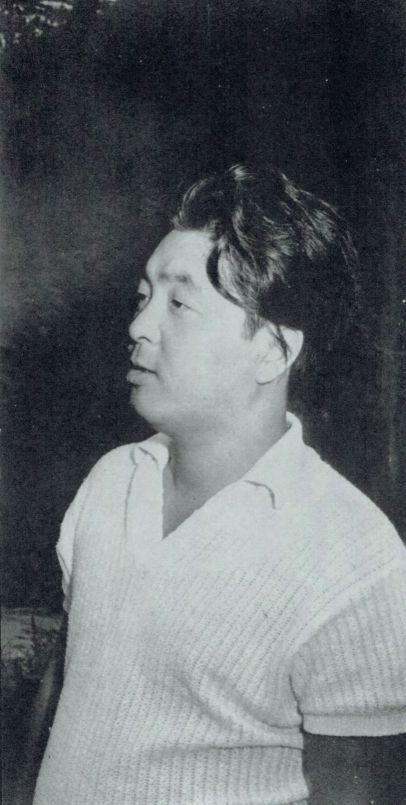
- Born: September 30, 1923; Tokyo Japan
- Died: November 4, 1989 (aged 66); Shinjuku Japan
- Occupation: author
- Known for: The Blade of the Courtesans

Keiichiro Ryu (隆 慶一郎, Ryū Keiichirō; September 30, 1923 – November 4, 1989) was a Japanese editor, acclaimed screenplay writer, and historical fiction writer.

== List of novels ==
1. The Blade of the Courtesans (ISBN 978-1-934287-01-9, 2008, Vertical Inc)
