= Yagyū Munefuyu =

Japanese daimyō (1613–1675)

Yagyū Munefuyu (柳生 宗冬; 1613 – November 16, 1675) was a daimyō and a teacher of kenjutsu and military strategy in Japan during the Edo period.

== Family ==
Munefuyu, who also went by the name Matajūrō, was the third son of Yagyū Munenori. One of his elder brothers was Yagyū Jūbei Mitsuyoshi. His younger brother was Retsudō Gisen, the real person who is fictionalized as Yagyū Retsudō, leader of the Ura-Yagyū (Shadow Yagyū), in Lone Wolf and Cub.

== Life ==
Born in 1613, in 1650, Munefuyu became the head of the Yagyū clan. In 1657 he received the title Hida no kami. In 1668 he rose to the rank of daimyo of the Yagyū Domain when he received an additional grant of land, bringing his holdings above the 10,000 koku minimum.

== Career teaching kenjitsu ==
Initially weaker than his brothers and father, a kōa tells how Munefuyu managed to become an expert after training his zanshin (vigilance) for several years in a temple.

Despite his success and fame, he was defeated in a single stroke by Yagyū Renya Toshikane (fourth headmaster of the Yagyū Shinkage-ryū), who had previously fought, before Tokugawa Yoshinao lord of Owari, over 30 duels without being hit. It is said since that time, Owari Yagyū and Edo Yagyū broke ties.

Mumefuyu’s highest-ranking pupil was Tokugawa Ietsuna, fourth Tokugawa shōgun.

Preceded by Yagyu Mitsuyoshi	3rd Daimyō of Yagyu; 1668–1675	Succeeded by Yagyu Muneari
