= Yagyū Mitsuyoshi =

Japanese samurai (1607–1650)

Yagyū Jūbē Mitsuyoshi (柳生 十兵衞 三厳, Yagyū Jūbē Mitsuyoshi; 1607 – April 21, 1650) was one of the most famous and romanticized of the samurai in Japan's feudal era.

== Life ==
Very little is known about the actual life of Yagyū Mitsuyoshi as the official records of his life are very sparse. Yagyū Jūbē Mitsuyoshi (born "Shichirō") grew up in his family's ancestral lands, Yagyū no Sato, now in Nara. He was the son of Yagyū Tajima no Kami Munenori, master swordsman of the Tokugawa shōguns, especially Ieyasu and Tokugawa Iemitsu, who prized Munenori as one of his top Counselors .

In 1616, Mitsuyoshi became an attendant in the court of the second Tokugawa Shōgun, Tokugawa Hidetada and became a sword instructor for the third Tokugawa Shōgun, Tokugawa Iemitsu, occasionally filling his father's role. Records of Yagyū Jūbē Mitsuyoshi, however, do not appear again until 1631, when Jūbē, by now regarded as the best swordsman from the Yagyū clan, is summarily and inexplicably dismissed by the Shōgun either due to Jūbē's boldness and brashness or his decision to embark on a Warrior's Pilgrimage (武者修行, Musha Shugyō).

His whereabouts are then unknown over the next twelve years—even the Yagyū clan's secret chronicles, which contained lengthy passages on numerous members, has little solid information on Jūbē—until Yagyū Jūbē reappears at the age of 36 at a demonstration of swordsmanship in front of the Shōgun. Following this exhibition, Jūbē was reinstated and serves for a short time as a government-inspector (御所印判, Gosho Inban), taking control over his father's lands until Yagyū Tajima no Kami Munenori's death in 1646.

Jūbē also authored a treatise known as Tsuki no Shō (月之抄) or The Art of Looking at the Moon outlining his school of swordsmanship as well as teachings influenced by the monk Takuan Sōhō who was a friend of his father's. In this work he briefly provides hints on his whereabouts during his absence from Edo Castle from 1631 to 1643 – traveling the countryside in perfecting his skill.

== Death ==
After residing in Edo for several years after his father's death, Jūbē left his government duties and returned to his home village where he died in early 1650 under uncertain circumstances. Some accounts say he died of a heart attack; others say he died while falcon hunting; some during fishing, while still others presume he was assassinated by his half-brother Yagyū Tomonori's attendants.

Jūbē was laid to rest in his home village of Yagyu behind the family temple of Hotojukuji alongside his father and brother. In keeping with tradition, Yagyū Jūbē was buried alongside his grandfather, Yagyū Munetoshi, and was survived by two daughters and his brother and successor Yagyū Munefuyu. Jūbē was given the Buddhist posthumous name of Sohgo.

== Eyepatch legend ==
Legend has it that Yagyū Jūbē had the use of only one eye; most legends state that he lost the other in a sword sparring session where his father, Yagyū Munenori, struck him accidentally. However, portraits from Jubei's time portray him as having both eyes. Several authors of late have chosen to portray Jūbē as having both eyes, though the classical "eyepatch" look remains standard. Others have chosen to have Jūbē lose an eye as an adult in order to incorporate the eyepatch legend.

== Fictional appearances ==
Due to Yagyū Jūbē's frequent disappearances and the fact of little existing records of his whereabouts, his life has bred speculation and interest and has been romanticized in popular fiction.

- Jūshirō Konoe played the role of Yagyū Jūbē in 11 films and 27 TV episodes:
  - Yagyu Tabi Nikki (柳生旅日記) Shochiku film series
    - Yagyu Travel Journal 1: Heaven and Earth Dream Sword (柳生旅日記 天地夢想剣) (1959)
    - Yagyu Travel Journal 2: Dragon Tiger Killing Sword (柳生旅日記 竜虎活殺剣) (1960)
  - Yagyu Bugeicho (柳生武芸帳) Toei film series
    - Yagyu Chronicles 1: The Secret Scrolls (柳生武芸帳) (1961)
    - Yagyu Chronicles 2: The Secret Sword (柳生武芸帳 夜ざくら秘剣) (1961)
    - Yagyu Chronicles 3: The Valley of Outlaws (柳生一番勝負 無頼の谷) (1961)
    - Yagyu Chronicles 4: One-Eyed Swordsman (柳生武芸帳 独眼一刀流) (1962)
    - Yagyu Chronicles 5: Jubē's Redemption (柳生武芸帳 片目の十兵衛) (1963)
    - Yagyu Chronicles 6: The Yagyu Scroll (柳生武芸帳 片目水月の剣) (1963)
    - Yagyu Chronicles 7: The Cloud of Disorder (柳生武芸帳 剣豪乱れ雲) (1963)
    - Yagyu Chronicles 8: The One-Eyed Ninja (柳生武芸帳 片目の忍者) (1963)
    - Yagyu Chronicles 9: Assassin's Sword (十兵衛暗殺剣) (1964)
  - Yagyu Bugeicho (柳生武芸帳) (1965) NET TV series - 26 episodes
  - Shadow Assassins (忍法かげろう斬り) (1972) Kansai TV TV series - 1 episode (#22)
- Gō Wakabayashi played the role of Yagyū Jūbē in 23 TV episodes and 1 TV movie:
  - Edo is Cut: Azusa Ukon's Secret Spy Chronicles (江戸を斬る 梓右近隠密帳) (1973-1974) TBS TV series - 7 episodes
  - Hikozaemon Okubo (大久保彦左衛門) (1974) Kansai TV TV series - 1 episode (#31)
  - Tokugawa Sangokushi (徳川三国志) (1975) NET TV series - 15 episodes
  - Kanei Chronicles: Clash! Wise Izu vs Yui Shosetsu (寛永風雲録 激突！知恵伊豆対由比正雪) (1991) Nippon TV TV movie
- Shinichi Chiba played the role of Yagyū Jūbē in 4 films, 91 TV episodes, and 1 TV movie:
  Note: The loss of Jubei's left eye is depicted in the first 3 productions. In Shogun's Samurai, Jubei is struck with a sword. In The Yagyu Conspiracy Jubei is hit by an arrow. And in Samurai Reincarnation, it occurs during a practice duel with his father.
  - Toei films directed by Kinji Fukasaku
    - Shogun's Samurai (aka The Yagyu Conspiracy) (柳生一族の陰謀) (1978)
    - Samurai Reincarnation (魔界転生) (1981)
  - The Yagyu Conspiracy (柳生一族の陰謀) (1978–79) Kansai TV TV series - 39 episodes
  - Yagyu Abaretabi (柳生あばれ旅) TV Asahi TV series
    - Yagyu Abaretabi (柳生あばれ旅) (1980-81) First Series - 26 episodes
    - Yagyu Jubei Abaretabi (柳生十兵衛あばれ旅) (1982–83) Second Series - 26 episodes
  - Iemitsu, Hikoza, and Isshin Tasuke (家光と彦左と一心太助 天下の一大事 危うし江戸城!) (1989) - TV movie
  - Sarutobi Sasuke and the Army of Darkness (猿飛佐助 闇の軍団) Cinema Paradise film series
    - Sarutobi Sasuke and the Army of Darkness 3: Wind Chapter (猿飛佐助 闇の軍団3 風の巻) (2005)
    - Sarutobi Sasuke and the Army of Darkness 4: Fire Chapter (猿飛佐助 闇の軍団4 火の巻 完結篇 (2005)
- Yūki Meguro, son of Jushiro Konoe, played the role of Yagyū Jūbē in 8 TV episodes:
  - Yagyu Shinkage Ryu (柳生新陰流) (1982) TV Tokyo TV series - 8 episodes
- Kinya Kitaōji played the role of Yagyū Jūbē in 2 large-scale TV movies (i.e. mini-series):
  - Fuun Yagyu Bugeicho (風雲柳生武芸帳) (1985) TV Tokyo
  - Tokugawa Chronicles: Ambition of the Three Branches (徳川風雲録 御三家の野望) (1987) TV Tokyo
- Hiroki Matsukata, son of Jushiro Konoe, played the role of Yagyū Jūbē in 5 TV movies and 1 film:
  - Yagyu Bugeicho (柳生武芸帳) Nippon TV TV movie series
    - Yagyu Bugeicho (柳生武芸帳) (1990)
    - Yagyu Bugeicho: Jubei's 50 Kills (柳生武芸帳 十兵衛五十人斬り) (1990)
    - Yagyu Bugeicho: Great Conspiracy in the Capital! Jubei and the Puzzling Princess (柳生武芸帳 京に渦巻く大陰謀！ 十兵衛と謎の姫君) (1991)
    - Yagyu Bugeicho: Jubei's Violent Travels (柳生武芸帳 十兵衛あばれ旅) (1991)
    - Yagyu Bugeicho: Jubei's Violent Travels, Date's 620,000 Koku Conspiracy (柳生武芸帳 十兵衛あばれ旅 伊達六十二万石の陰謀) (1992)
  - Yagyu Jubei: The Fate of the World (柳生十兵衛 世直し旅) (2015) All in Entertainment film
- Hiroshi Katsuno played the role of Yagyū Jūbē in 44 TV episodes:
  - Shogun Iemitsu's Secret Journey (将軍家光忍び旅) TV Asahi TV series
    - Shogun Iemitsu's Secret Journey (将軍家光忍び旅) (1990-1991) Series 1 - 22 episodes
    - Shogun Iemitsu's Secret Journey II (軍家光忍び旅II) (1992-1993) Series 2 - 22 episodes
- Hiroaki Murakami played the role of Yagyū Jūbē in 1 large-scale TV movie (i.e. mini-series) and 21 TV episodes:
  - Three Generations of the Yagyu Sword (徳川武芸帳 柳生三代の剣) (1993) TV Tokyo
  - Legendary Swordfights of Yagyu Jubei (柳生十兵衛七番勝負) TV series
    - Legendary Swordfights of Yagyu Jubei (柳生十兵衛七番勝負) (2005) First Series - 6 episodes
    - Legendary Swordfights of Yagyu Jubei: The Shimabara Rebellion (柳生十兵衛七番勝負 島原の乱) (2006) Second Series - 7 episodes
    - Legendary Swordfights of Yagyu Jubei: The Final Duels (柳生十兵衛七番勝負 最後の闘い) (2007) Third Series - 8 episodes
- Hideki Saijo played the role of Yagyū Jūbē in the 1992 TV series Tokugawa Buraichō (徳川無頼帳) (24 episodes).
- Goro Ibuki played the role of Yagyū Jūbē in the 1974 TV series Unmeitōge (Fateful Mountain Pass) (Toei TV, 21 episodes)
- Director/writer Yoshiaki Kawajiri in his enormously popular animated film Ninja Scroll, created the lead character Jubei Kibagami as a homage to Yagyū Jūbē. He is voiced by Japanese voice actor Kōichi Yamadera. The movie also had a sequel - Ninja Scroll: The Series - that features a recurring character named Yagyu Renya, a one-eyed master swordsman from the Yagyū Clan.
- A character named Jubei Tachibana appears in the second installment of the Tenchu video game series, Tenchu 2: Birth of the Stealth Assassins. Jubei is depicted as a one-eyed samurai and the finest of Lord Gohda's warriors, and serves as the final boss of the character Tatsumaru's plotline.
- An alternate variation can be found in the anime Shura no Toki. In this version Jubei was initially known as having only one eye, but actually covered the other to challenge himself. However, upon taking the eyepatch off to duel the fictional Mutsu Takato, Jubei actually loses his eye.
- Yagyū Kyūbei from the manga Gin Tama takes her name from him, and also wears an eyepatch.
- Jubei also appeared in the manga-anime Yaiba as one of the hero's resurrected allies.
- Another one is Jubei-chan: The Ninja Girl where a modern high school girl becomes an unwilling heir to the Yagyu Jubei school of swordsmanship.
- In Yagyuu Hijouken Samon by Ryu Keiichiro and Tabata Yoshiaki, Jubei is said to have lost his eye in a fight with Yagyuu Samon, his younger brother.
- Arc System Works' BlazBlue video game series features an anthropomorphic cat character named Jubei. He is said to be one of the greatest warriors in the world, and is depicted with a sword guard for an eye patch.
- The SNK video game Samurai Shodown features a master swordsman named Yagyu Jubei who wears an eyepatch.
- Jubei and his brothers Yagyū Munefuyu and Retsudō Gisen feature prominently in another novel by Ryu Keiichiro, The Blade of the Courtesans.
- Jubei is the hero in Futaro Yamada's novel Makai Tenshō. The novel's been adapted into several movies, manga, anime, a PS2 game and even a couple of stage plays.
- Yagyu Jubei appears in the table top game Ninja All Stars by Sodapop Miniatures
- Yagyu Jubei had a guest-starring drama on BoBoiBoy Galaxy.
- In the video game series Senran Kagura one of the characters is a girl named Yagyū who wears an eyepatch over her right eye.
- The main character of the video game Onimusha 2 goes by "Jubei Yagyu", but is actually Yagyū Mitsuyoshi's grandfather, Yagyū Muneyoshi.
