= Yagyū Hyōgonosuke =

Yagyū Hyōgonosuke (柳生 兵庫助; 1579–1650) or — Toshitoshi (利厳) was the founder of the Owari mainline of the Yagyū Shinkage-ryū style of swordsmanship in the early Edo period. He was a son of Yagyū Toshikatsu and a grandson of Yagyū Muneyoshi (Sekishūsai). His name is sometimes mispronounced as Toshiyoshi, but the kanji 厳 reading was passed down as "toshi" in the Yagyū family. His Zokumyō (first name taken at the time of the Genpuku) was originally Chūjirō, and his Kaimyō (Dharma name) was Jo'un-sai; though he is mostly remembered as Hyōgonosuke.

He was favored by the old Sekishūsai over Munenori, who had been recommended to the Shōgun.

From 1603 to 1607, he served Katō Kiyomasa. Thereafter, he became an itinerant warrior. Beginning in 1615, he served Tokugawa Yoshinao, the founder of the Owari branch of the Tokugawa clan. He directly instructed Yoshinao in the Yagyū Shinkage-ryū.

== In legend ==
While the famous swordsman Miyamoto Musashi was staying in Nagoya, Musashi noticed a certain warrior walking in the street; carrying himself in a manner that was striking to Musashi. Musashi then approached Hyogonosuke, and Hyogonosuke did the same. Musashi asked, "Aren't you Lord Yagyu Hyogonosuke?" Hyogonosuke replied, "I am. Aren't you Lord Miyamoto Musashi?". Though Musashi and Hyogonosuke had never once met each other at any time in the past, because of the way he carried himself, along with the certain martial energy that he emanated, it could not have been anyone else but Hyogonosuke. So instead of measuring each other in combat, Hyogonosuke and Musashi instead conversed like old friends within the house of Yagyu.

Hyogonusuke also appears in "Musashi" by Eiji Yoshikawa.
