= Yagyū, Nara =

Quarter in the city of Nara, Nara Prefecture, Japan

Coordinates: 34°44′02″N 135°57′08″E

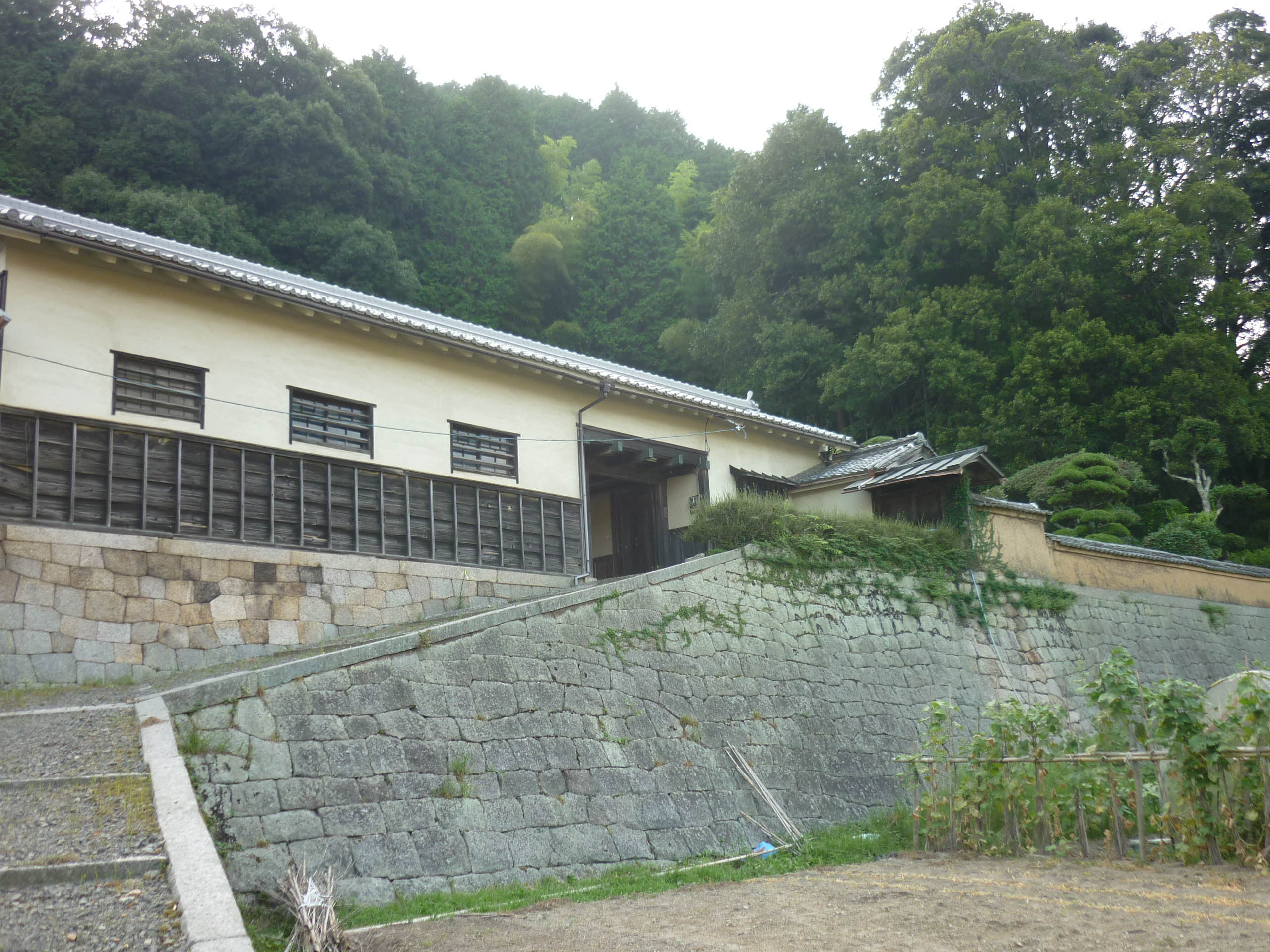
Kyū Yagyū-han karō yashiki

Yagyū (柳生町, Yagyū-chō) is a village near the city of Nara, Nara Prefecture, Japan. The center of Yagyū is about 20 km to the east, in the direction of Mie Prefecture on Route 369, from the center of the city of Nara. In the context of tourism, Yagyū no sato (柳生の里) also used to include neighbouring area to Yagyū-chō, which were mostly former territories of the Yagyū Han, incorporated into the city of Nara in 1957. E.g. Including, but not limited to, Yagyū-shimo-chō (柳生下町), Ōyagyū-chō (大柳生町). The area was formerly part of Iga province.

== Places of interest ==
Some famous locations of interest in Yagyū no sato include:

- Hōtoku-ji (芳徳寺)
- Enjō-ji (円成寺)
- The home of the former karō of the Yagyū clan (旧柳生藩家老屋敷 Kyū Yagyū-han karō yashiki)

The road leading to, and through, Yagyu is one of the most popular and enjoyable motorcycle rides in the Kansai area. Its popularity is well known in Nara, Wakayama, and Kyoto. Not only is the ride beautiful, but the technical aspects of the switchbacks, hairpins and fast left-handers make for an exciting ride (Route 4 in Nara Prefecture).
