= Samurai Reincarnation =

1981 film written and directed by Kinji Fukasaku

- Theatrical poster
- Directed by: Kinji Fukasaku
- Written by: Kinji Fukasaku; Tatsuo Nogami
- Based on: Makai Tenshō by Futaro Yamada
- Produced by: Haruki Kadokawa
- Starring: Sonny Chiba; Kenji Sawada; Hiroyuki Sanada; Ken Ogata; Tomisaburo Wakayama
- Cinematography: Kiyoshi Hasegawa
- Edited by: Isamu Ichida
- Music by: Hōzan Yamamoto; Mitsuaki Kanno
- Distributed by: Toei Company
- Release date: June 6, 1981
- Running time: 122 minutes
- Country: Japan
- Language: Japanese

Samurai Reincarnation (Japanese: 魔界転生, Hepburn: Makai Tenshō; 'Demon Realm Reincarnation') is a 1981 Japanese dark fantasy film written and directed by Kinji Fukasaku and starring Sonny Chiba, Kenji Sawada, and Hiroyuki Sanada. It is based on the novel of the same name by Futaro Yamada.

The film was nominated for three Awards of the Japanese Academy and won two of them. Sanada won best newcomer of the year and Tokumichi Igawa and Yoshikazu Sano took the award for best art direction. The film was nominated for best sound but did not win the award.

== Plot ==
Following the Shimabara Rebellion, Christian rebellion leader Amakusa Shiro is resurrected, and renounces his God for abandoning him and thousands of Christians to be massacred by the Tokugawa regime, swearing vengeance.

Gaining the power to resurrect the dead, he tempts, resurrects and recruits the betrayed samurai wife Hosokawa Gracia, unfulfilled legendary swordsman Miyamoto Musashi, and Buddhist monk Hozoin Inshun, who represses his sadistic desires, to join his cause as regret-filled demons. Yagyu Jubei, son of Musashi's desired rival, Yagyu Tajima-no-kami Munenori, arrives at Musashi's cave to seek his teaching, but finds only his empty armor.

Additionally, young Iga ninja Kirimaru, a friend of Jubei, is narrowly saved by Shiro and his demons after his village is massacred by the rival Tokugawa-controlled Koga ninja clan. Kirimaru is resurrected and recruited by Shiro for vengeance against the Koga, and the demons taunt the arriving Jubei as they leave.

The demons infiltrate the Tokugawa Shogunate at Edo Castle. Hosokawa seduces Shogun Tokugawa Ietsuna, and the demons assassinate key official Izu-no-kami, Koga leader Genjuro, and Jubei's brother Samon. The terminally-ill Tajima attempts to put a stop to Shiro using a sword forged by exiled swordsmith Muramasa, but succumbs to his illness after successfully killing Inshun. Tajima is resurrected and joins Shiro, tempted by the prospect of challenging his son to a duel; he attacks Jubei as he returns home, and Jubei barely escapes.

In a remote shrine, Shiro casts a curse to wither Tokugawa's crops, sparking protests by farmers against the shogunate's taxes. Kirimaru begins to feel affection for a young girl orphaned by the protests, Omitsu. Jubei seeks out Muramasa, and learns that Tajima had commissioned a sword capable of killing demonic spirits. Musashi attacks in search of Jubei, but is driven away after recognising a flute tune played by Otsu, niece of Musashi's abandoned wife. Muramasa, who had adopted Otsu, is convinced by Musashi's attack to forge a similar sword for Jubei.

Shiro tempts Kirimaru to seduce Omitsu to complete his descent into evil. Kirimaru attempts to force himself on her, but finds he is unable to go through with it. A watching Jubei ultimately spares the repentant Kirimaru, seeing his latent conscience. Meanwhile, the shogunate holds a lavish hunting party, and a group of angered farmers interrupt the hunt in protest of the high taxes invoked to fund it. Hosokawa and Tajima trick Ietsuna into shooting down the farmers. Muramasa finishes forging Jubei's sword, proclaiming it can even kill God, before dying from exhaustion.

The executed farmers are crucified on a hill, and Shiro incites a bloody riot among the gathered peasants, before rallying them as his army to ride to Edo and overthrow the Shogun. Kirimaru attempts to escape with Omitsu, but is killed by Shiro. An arriving Jubei swears to avenge Kirimaru, before Musashi challenges Jubei to a duel at Funajima the following morning. Jubei and Otsu confront Musashi at Funajima, and Jubei slays Musashi in their duel.

As the peasants' uprising continues to advance on the capital, Hosokawa takes Ietsuna hostage and rampages through Edo Castle with Tajima, setting the castle ablaze. Shiro reveals himself to the Shogun before the insane Hosokawa falls with Ietsuna into the flames. Jubei, his body now warded with Buddhist prayer symbols, arrives and duels Tajima in the burning castle. Jubei's sword is broken, and Tajima is eventually killed with his own Muramasa sword.

Shiro appears, offering to let Jubei join him. Jubei refuses, and manages to decapitate Shiro in the ensuing fight. Still living, Shiro takes his severed head, and vows to continue resurrecting as long as humanity exists, before disappearing into the flames.

== Cast ==
- Sonny Chiba as Yagyū Jūbei Mitsuyoshi
- Kenji Sawada as Amakusa Shirō Tokisada
- Tomisaburo Wakayama as Yagyū Tajimanokami Munenori
- Ken Ogata as Miyamoto Musashi
- Akiko Kana as Hosokawa Gracia / Akechi Tama
- Hideo Murota as Priest Hōzōin Inshun
- Hiroyuki Sanada as Iga no Kirimaru
- Tetsuro Tamba as Muramasa
- Mikio Narita as Matsudaira Izunokami Nobutsuna
- Noboru Matsuhashi as Tokugawa Ietsuna
- Jun Ōba as Yagyū Samon Tomonori
- Etsuo Shima as Yagyū Matajūrō Munefuyu
- Masataka Naruse as Koga Genjūrō
- Asao Uchida as Sakai Utanokami Tadayo
- Haruki Kadokawa as Itakura Naizennokami Shigemasa
- Gōzō Sōma as Abe Bungonokami Tadaaki
- Sen Okamichi as Hotta Bichunokami Masamori
- Masataka Kobayashi as Toda Ujikane
- Saburo Hayashi as Mizuno Katsushige
- Hideo Nakae as Hosokawa Tadatoshi
- Hideo Shimada as Tachibana Muneshige
- Shintarō Mibu as Nabeshima Katsushige
- Mizuho Suzuki as Ogasawara Hōmyō Hidekiyo
- Shigerō Shiroi as Sasaki Kojirō
- Naoko Kubo as Yajima no Tsubone
- Kinji Nakamura as Ishida Kazusanokami
- Kenji Kawai as Kamio Bizennokami
- Yasuhiro Suzuki as Tomita Shuzen
- Masaharu Arikawa as Izaki Heinai
- Masataka Iwao as Yasui Tōbei
- Jun Hamamura as Shigesaemon
- Katsutoshi Akiyama as Yohei
- Takashi Noguchi as Hikosaku
- Kayoko Shiraishi as Hosokawa Gracia (voice)
- Seizō Fukumoto as Koga Ninja
- Hiroshi Inuzuka as Sōgorō
