= Ninja Resurrection =

Japanese original video animation (OVA)

- First North American DVD release cover

魔界転生 (Makai Tenshō)
- Original video animation
- Directed by: Yasunori Urata
- Produced by: Yasuhito Yamaki
- Written by: Kensei Date
- Music by: Masamichi Amano
- Studio: Phoenix Entertainment
- Released: February 27, 1997 – March 27, 1998
- Runtime: 40 minutes
- Episodes: 2
- icon

Ninja Resurrection (Japanese: 魔界転生, Hepburn: Makai Tenshō; 'Demon Realm Reincarnation') is a two-part Japanese original video animation (OVA) directed by Yasunori Urata and produced by Phoenix Entertainment. Based on Futaro Yamada's novel of the same name, the OVA was released from February 1997 to March 1998. Though unrelated narratively, ADV Films marketed Ninja Resurrection as a Ninja Scroll sequel during its initial North American release.

== Plot ==
The Tokugawa era is marked by the violent suppression of Christianity in Japan. After the failed Shimabara Rebellion, its leader Amakusa Shirō is assassinated by government forces. His restless spirit lingers, thirsting for vengeance against those who crushed his followers. The legendary swordsman Yagyū Jūbei Mitsuyoshi becomes entangled in this supernatural conflict when tasked with stopping Shirō's demonic resurrection.

Years earlier, a young boy named Shirō miraculously survives being shot by anti-Christian soldiers, with the bullet striking a crucifix he carries. The villagers hail him as their messiah. A decade later during the Shimabara uprising, Shirō leads Christian rebels from Harano Castle against the shogunate's forces. His lieutenant Mori Sōiken proclaims their victories as divine will, while Shirō preaches mercy toward their enemies. However, the Tokugawa general Matsudaira Nobutsuna employs ninja forces to break the rebellion.

Jūbei infiltrates Harano Castle with four ninja companions, slaughtering the defenders through brutal tactics. Shirō shelters women and children in a magically sealed chapel, but the ninjas dismantle its protections. When confronted, Shirō offers ritual suicide to spare the innocent, but Soiken intervenes, revealing he murdered two children to provoke Shirō's wrath. Consumed by fury, Shirō transforms into a demonic entity, summoning a black dragon in battle against Jūbei. After a vicious struggle, Jūbei impales Shirō, sending him crashing into the burning chapel.

Mortally wounded and abandoned by his faith, Shirō succumbs to Soiken's manipulations. Through a profane ritual called Makai Tenshō involving Soiken's daughter Ocho, Shirō is reborn as a vessel of Satan. Meanwhile, Jūbei departs after burying the slain children, unaware of the greater evil now unleashed.

Years later, the resurrected spirits of legendary warriors-Hōzōin Inshun, Araki Mataemon and Botaro Tamiya—begin slaughtering spies and civilians under the command of Shosetsu Yui and Soiken. During a blood moon ritual, Ocho's body horrifically transforms into a new vessel for Shirō's demonic rebirth. Now fully embracing his satanic destiny, Shirō leads his undead allies in a massacre at a festival, signaling the beginning of his apocalyptic vengeance against Japan. The crimson moon watches as the reborn warriors leap into the night, their slaughter only beginning.

== Production and release ==
Produced by Phoenix Entertainment and directed by Yasunori Urata, the two-episode original video animation (OVA) Ninja Resurrection was released in Japan on February 27, 1997, and March 27, 1998. The OVA is based on Futaro Yamada's novel Makai Tenshō. Originally intended as a six-volume series, production was ultimately discontinued following a real-life crime incident.

The OVA was released in North America by ADV Films, with the two episodes first coming out individually on VHS and later together on DVD. The title was promoted by ADV Films as a continuation of Ninja Scroll.

== Reception ==
Critical reception of Ninja Resurrection was mixed, leaning toward negative. Michael Wieczorek of Anime News Network dismissed it as excessively violent with little narrative substance, criticizing its poor English dub while conceding some animation quality. Jason Bustard from THEM Anime Reviews condemned its misleading association with Ninja Scroll and gratuitous violence, calling its historical premise wasted and criticizing absurd elements like jet-propelled armor, despite acknowledging decent animation.

In contrast, Chris Beveridge of AnimeOnDVD assessed the OVA more favorably, emphasizing its historical setting and action-driven narrative. He cautioned against viewing it as a Ninja Scroll sequel, but praised its animation and dubbed performances, recommending it to fans of the genre despite its unresolved cliffhanger ending. Mike Toole of Anime Jump highlighted the incorporation of historical figures like Amakusa Shirō and Yagyū Jūbei as a strength, though he noted the graphic violence and unconventional portrayal of Christian themes might not appeal to all viewers.
