= Samurai Resurrection =

2003 film directed by Hideyuki Hirayama

- Theatrical release poster

Japanese name
- Kanji: 魔界転生
Transcriptions
- Revised Hepburn: Makai Tensho
- Directed by: Hideyuki Hirayama
- Screenplay by: Satoko Okudera
- Based on: Makai Tenshō by Futaro Yamada
- Produced by: Hiroshi Deme; Kazuto Amano
- Starring: Kōichi Satō; Yosuke Kubozuka; Kumiko Asō
- Cinematography: Katsumi Yanagijima
- Edited by: Akimasa Kawashima; Chieko Suzaki
- Music by: Goro Yasukawa
- Production companies: Kadokawa Shoten; Nippan Group Holdings; Nippon Television; Yomiuri Telecasting Corporation; Tokyo FM
- Distributed by: Toei
- Release date: April 26, 2003 (Japan)
- Running time: 106 minutes
- Country: Japan
- Language: Japanese

Samurai Resurrection (Japanese: 魔界転生, Hepburn: Makai Tenshō; 'Demon Realm Reincarnation') is a 2003 Japanese film directed by Hideyuki Hirayama. It is based on the novel of the same name by Futaro Yamada.

== Cast ==
- Yosuke Kubozuka as Shiro-Tokisada Amakusa
- Kumiko Asō as Clara Oshina
- Tetta Sugimoto as Yorinobu Tokugawa
- Arata Furuta as Inshun Hozoin
- Masaya Kato as Mataemon Araki
- Kyozo Nagatsuka as Musashi Miyamoto
- Kōichi Satō as Jubei Yagyu
- Akira Emoto
- Arata Furuta as Hōzōin Inshun
- Jun Kunimura
- Katsuo Nakamura as Yagyu Tajima-no-Kami Munenori
- Yōji Tanaka
