= Makai Tenshō =

Novel by Fūtarō Yamada

Makai Tenshō (Japanese: 魔界転生; Demon Realm Reincarnation) is a historical fantasy novel by Futaro Yamada. It was serialized in Osaka Shimbun newspaper between December 1964 and February 1965 under the title Oboro Ninpōchō.

It is a tale in which Mori Sōiken resurrects other dead historical figures to overthrow the Shogunate, while Yagyū Jūbei Mitsuyoshi rises to fight him and his warriors of the dead.

== Plot ==
The tale starts in the Tokugawa shogunate, immediately after the Shimabara rebellion, when Yui Shōsetsu and Miyamoto Musashi stumble upon Mori Sōiken using a ninpou magic, Makai Tenshō, to resurrect Amakusa Shirō Tokisada and Araki Mataemon. Realizing his power, Shōsetsu begs Sōiken to take him along as they depart. Several years later, they return with undead army of legendary warriors and sorcerers, among them Miyamoto Musashi and Tamiya Bōtarō, and plan to use their supernatural skills to destroy the shogunate. However, the crown of their army, Yagyū Jūbei Mitsuyoshi, breaks free from their control and becomes determined by his own reasons to stop their rebellion before it starts.

== Characters ==
The roster of the dead varies depending on adaptation, but usually contains Amakusa, Musashi, Yagyu Munenori, and Hōzōin Inshun. Soiken himself is often left out in adaptations, which tend to have instead Amakusa as the villain mastermind of the story.

- Yagyū Jūbei Mitsuyoshi
- Mori Sōiken
- Amakusa Shirō Tokisada
- Araki Mataemon
- Tamiya Bōtarō
- Hōzōin Inshun
- Hosokawa Gracia
- Yagyū Jounsai Toshiyoshi
- Yagyu Munenori
- Miyamoto Musashi
- Yui Shōsetsu
- Tokugawa Yorinobu
- Tokugawa Iemitsu

== Adaptations ==
=== Film ===
- Samurai Reincarnation (魔界転生, Makai Tenshō; 1981) starring Sonny Chiba, directed by Kinji Fukasaku.
- Reborn from Hell: Samurai Armageddon (魔界転生, Makai Tenshō; 1996 direct-to-video) directed by Kazumasa Shirai.
  - Reborn from Hell II: Jubei's Revenge (魔界転生 魔道変, Makai Tenshō: Madō-hen; 1996 direct-to-video) directed by Kazumasa Shirai.
- Samurai Resurrection (魔界転生, Makai Tenshō; 2003) directed by Hideyuki Hirayama.

=== Manga ===
- Makai Tenshō (魔界転生; 1987) by Ken Ishikawa.
- Makai Tenshō: Yume no Ato (魔界転生 夢の跡; 1997) by Shōko Toba.
- Makai Tenshō (魔界転生; 2003) by Shinzō Tomi.
- Makai Tenshō: Beato no Kōshin (魔界転生 聖者の行進; 2003) by Naoko Kugo.
- Jū: Ninpō Makai Tenshō (十 ～忍法魔界転生～; 2012) by Masaki Segawa.

=== Anime ===
- Ninja Resurrection (魔界転生, Makai Tenshō; 1997-1998 OVA) directed by Yasunori Urata.

=== Others ===
- Yagyū Jūbei: Makai Tenshō (柳生十兵衛・魔界転生; 1981), a stage play directed by Kinji Fukasaku.
- Resurrection from Hell (魔界転生, Makai Tenshō; 2003), a PS2 video game developed by Tamsoft and published by D3 Publisher.
- Makai Tenshō (魔界転生; 2006), a stage play directed by G2.
- Makai Tenshō (魔界転生; 2011), a stage play by the Herohero Q theatrical company.
- Makai Tenshō (魔界転生; 2018), a stage play produced to commemorate the 65th anniversary of Nippon Television.
- Fate/Grand Order - The Stage of Carnage: Shimosa (フェイト/グランドオーダー 屍山血河舞台, Feito/Gurando Ōdā - Shizankegga Butai; 2017) featured an adaptation of the story, crossed with Dante's Inferno, as part of a storyline set in Shimōsa.
