= Vendetta for a Samurai =

Vendetta of a Samurai
- Film poster
- Directed by: Kazuo Mori
- Written by: Akira Kurosawa
- Produced by: Sôjirô Motoki
- Starring: Takashi Shimura; Toshiro Mifune
- Cinematography: Taiichi Kankura
- Distributed by: Toho Film Distributing Co. Ltd.
- Release date: January 3, 1952 (Japan)
- Running time: 82 minutes
- Country: Japan
- Language: Japanese

Vendetta of a Samurai (Japanese: 決闘鍵屋の辻, Hepburn: Kettō kagiya no tsuji) is a 1952 black-and-white Japanese film directed by Kazuo Mori made for Toho and starring Toshiro Mifune and Takashi Shimura. The script was written by Akira Kurosawa.

== Plot ==
Araki Mataemon, a renowned swordsman, helps a young man find vengeance, an event known as the Igagoe vendetta. The opening scene has Araki sternly accosting Jinza with a formal proclamation of vengeance for the killing of his family member. Jinza cackles villainously and an epic fight commences.

Just then a narrator breaks in to explain that this is a traditional version of the showdown at Kagiya Corner that has been told through the centuries which happened at the start of the 17th century. It is about a vendetta because of the killing of a family member, and the samurai connected with the family want revenge and Araki is one of the samurai who go looking for a showdown. The facts surrounding the vendetta have been expanded and distorted through the telling, and the villain Jinza was actually a noble man and the close friend of Mataemon Araki, whom he faces off against at Kagiya corner. The narrative returns to November 7, 1634, and Mataemon's party arrives at an inn on the site one hour before the fight will take place. As the men prepare for their ambush, we get a series of flashbacks filling in the backstory piece by piece.

== Cast ==
- Toshiro Mifune as Araki Mataemon
- Takashi Shimura as Jinza
- Minoru Chiaki as Matagoro
- Daisuke Katō as Mago
- Kokuten Kōdō as the Innkeeper
- Bokuzen Hidari as Magoemon the elder
- Toranosuke Ogawa as Buemon
- Yuriko Hamada
- Akihiko Katayama
- Shin Tokudaiji
