= Ninja Scroll =

1993 film by Yoshiaki Kawajiri

- Theatrical release poster

Japanese name
- Kanji: 獣兵衛忍風帖
Transcriptions
- Revised Hepburn: Jūbē Ninpūchō
- Directed by: Yoshiaki Kawajiri
- Written by: Yoshiaki Kawajiri
- Produced by: Shigeru Kitayama; Masako Fukuyo; Kazuhiko Ikeguchi
- Starring: Koichi Yamadera; Emi Shinohara; Takeshi Aono; Daisuke Gōri; Toshihiko Seki; Shūichirō Moriyama
- Cinematography: Hitoshi Yamaguchi
- Edited by: Harutoshi Ogata; Yukiko Itō
- Music by: Kaoru Wada
- Production company: Animate Film
- Distributed by: Tokyo Theatres Company
- Release date: June 5, 1993
- Running time: 94 minutes
- Country: Japan
- Language: Japanese

Ninja Scroll (Japanese: 獣兵衛忍風帖, Hepburn: Jūbē Ninpūchō; lit. 'Jubei's Ninja Chronicles') is a 1993 Japanese animated jidaigeki-chanbara film written and directed by Yoshiaki Kawajiri, starring the voices of Koichi Yamadera, Emi Shinohara, Takeshi Aono, Daisuke Gōri, Toshihiko Seki and Shūichirō Moriyama. The film was produced by Animate Film and distributed by Tokyo Theatres Company. Ninja Scroll was theatrically released in Japan on June 5, 1993, and received an English-dubbed release through Manga Entertainment in 1995.

The film takes place in feudal Japan and follows Kibagami Jubei, a mercenary swordsman who battles the Eight Devils of Kimon, a team of ninjas with supernatural powers who are intent on overthrowing the Tokugawa shogunate. During his quest, he is aided by Dakuan, an elderly but crafty government spy, and Kagero, a Kōga kunoichi whose body is infused with toxins.

Praised for its animation and action scenes, Ninja Scroll is regarded by many as one of the most influential anime films ever made. Alongside Akira and Ghost in the Shell, it was responsible for increasing the popularity of adult-oriented anime outside of Japan. The film has been cited by The Wachowskis as an influence on the Matrix franchise, and resulted in Kawajiri later contributing to two segments of the anthology film The Animatrix.

A televised sequel, Ninja Scroll: The Series, was aired in Japan in 2003.

== Plot ==
In Edo period-Japan, the Yamashiro clan (山城藩, Yamashiro-han) mines gold in secret, and sends a shipment to the Toyotomi Shogun of the Dark (闇公方, Yami Kubō) as payment for his protection. The Shogun of the Dark intends to use the gold to buy advanced Spanish weaponry and overthrow the current government, the Tokugawa Shogunate. The ship runs aground onto Mochizuki territory (望月藩, Mochizuki-han) in a storm, and the Eight Devils of Kimon (鬼門八人衆, Kimon Hachininshū), a ninja team with supernatural powers in the employ of the Yamashiro, kill the people of the nearby Shimoda Village (下田村, Shimoda-mura) to keep the gold shipment a secret.

While investigating the deaths, a Mochizuki Kōga ninja team is massacred by the Devils. The sole survivor, the kunoichi Kagero (陽炎, Kagerō), is captured by a Devil, Tessai (鉄斎, Tessai), who attempts to rape her. She is rescued by Kibagami Jubei (牙神 獣兵衛, Kibagami Jūbē), a mercenary ex-Yamashiro ninja, who fights and eventually kills Tessai. Dakuan (濁庵, Dakuan), a Tokugawa spy, blackmails Jubei into helping him kill the remaining Devils. To ensure his compliance, Dakuan stabs Jubei with a poisoned shuriken, and promises to give him an antidote once the mission is complete. Jubei learns from Dakuan that the leader of the Devils is Himuro Gemma (氷室 弦馬, Himuro Genma), the former Yamashiro ninja leader, who had ordered his team's members to kill each other to cover up the location of the goldmine five years earlier. Jubei, who had been forced to kill his comrades to survive, decapitated Gemma in revenge; Gemma survived due to his immortality. Jubei is attacked by another Devil, Benisato (紅里, Benisato), but he is saved by Kagero; before she can be questioned, Benisato is killed from afar by Yurimaru (百合丸, Yurimaru), Gemma's right-hand man, for failing her mission. Kagero agrees to work alongside Jubei and Dakuan, who informs Jubei that her body is infused with such deadly toxins that anyone who kisses or sleeps with her dies, which was why Jubei could kill Tessai.

The trio arrive in Shimoda, where they discover that the villagers died due to their water supply being poisoned, making it appear that they were killed by a plague. Jubei and Kagero fend off attacks from three of the Devils – Mushizo (蟲蔵, Mushizō), Zakuro (石榴, Zakuro), and Utsutsu Mujuro (現 夢十郎, Utsutsu Mujūrō); Jubei succeeds in killing Mushizo and Utsutsu. After finding the beached ship, Kagero deduces that the gold has been taken to Kashima Harbor, where it will be transported to the Shogun of the Dark in another ship.

Jubei, Kagero, and Dakuan arrive at Kashima, which has been evacuated due to the townspeople's fear of the plague. While Jubei battles another Devil, Shijima (シジマ, Shijima), Kagero sends a message to Sakaki Hyobu (榊 兵部, Sakaki Hyōbu), the Mochizuki chamberlain, to bring his army to the harbor. She also learns from Dakuan that Jubei's poisoning will only be cured if he copulates with her – the poisons in her body will counteract his. Kagero is captured by Shijima, and Jubei kills him, rescuing her once more. Kagero asks Jubei to sleep with her to cure himself. He decides against it, and upon the arrival of the Shogun of the Dark's envoy in a ship, he leaves to prevent the gold reaching its destination.

Kagero arrives to meet Sakaki, but he stabs her, revealing himself to be Gemma in disguise as he had murdered the real one days before. Enraged, Jubei fights through waves of ninjas, but is nearly killed by Yurimaru. A gunpowder-rigged rat, left as a trap by Zakuro for Yurimaru for rejecting her advances, kills him, allowing Jubei to escape. He finds Kagero; mortally wounded, she admits her love for him and they kiss, curing Jubei's poisoning. Before dying, Kagero gives Jubei her headband.

Jubei and Dakuan board the departing ship. On board, Gemma reveals his true intentions – to use the gold to raise a ninja army to terrorize Japan rather than serve as an ally to the Toyotomi – to a masked samurai who serves as the Shogun of the Dark's envoy, and proceeds to kill him. During an altercation with Zakuro, Jubei and Dakuan set the ship ablaze. As Jubei and Gemma engage in a brutal fight, the gold becomes molten and engulfs Gemma, who sinks to the bottom of the sea. Afterwards, Dakuan thanks Jubei, and expresses admiration for his and Kagero's humanity. Jubei resumes his vagabond lifestyle, with Kagero's headband tied around his sword's hilt.

== Cast ==
Role	Japanese	English
Role	Japanese	Animaze/Manga Entertainment
Kibagami Jubei	Koichi Yamadera	Dean Wein
Kagero	Emi Shinohara	Wendee Lee
Dakuan	Takeshi Aono	Steve Apostolina
Masked samurai	Osamu Saka	Michael Forest
Himuro Gemma	Daisuke Gōri	Richard Epcar
Doujin	Ichirō Nagai	Doug Stone
Tessai	Ryūzaburō Ōtomo	Kevin Seymour
Shijima	Akimasa Ōmori	Kevin Seymour
Benisato	Gara Takashima	Marbry Steward
Hanza	Katsuji Mori	Kirk Thornton
Genpachi	Yūsaku Yara	Doug Stone
Utsutsu Mujuro	Norio Wakamoto	Kirk Thornton
Yurimaru	Toshihiko Seki	Richard Cansino
Zakuro	Masako Katsuki	Riva Spier
Mushizo	Reizō Nomoto	Milt Jamin
Shinkuro	Jun'ichi Sugawara	Milt Jamin
Villager	Katsumi Suzuki	Marvyn Byrkett
Sakaki Hyobu	Shūichirō Moriyama	Edward Mannix

== Development ==
Ninja Scroll's story and style was influenced by the works of novelist Futaro Yamada and Western spy fiction, with Jubei's character being loosely based on the historical figure Yagyū Jūbei Mitsuyoshi. Kawajiri considered it difficult to adapt Yamada's works into animation, and opted for a simple depiction. He stated that he found simplifying the storyline to be the most challenging aspect. The choice to contain lots of expository dialogue was considered necessary, due to younger audiences not being familiar with the culture of historical dramas.

The film was originally meant to consist of two films, being 45 minutes each. The storyboard was written this way, which is why there are climax scenes in the first and second half of the film.

== Release ==
The film was licensed by Manga Entertainment in Australia and North America until 2012 while its UK subsidiary kept the license and released the movie in a Blu-ray steelbook format in October 2012. The film has since been re-licensed in North America to Sentai Filmworks who re-released the film on DVD and Blu-ray in December 2012 and in January 2025 (Blu-ray only).

In 1995, the BBFC cut the UK version by approximately 52 seconds, removing the sexual assault scene and images of throwing stars. These cuts were waived for the 2004 10th Anniversary release. Ninja Scroll was released in Australia by Manga UK in 1995 uncut with the MA15+ classification. In 1997 after it was screened on SBS, former Attorney-General Philip Ruddock controversially appealed the film's original classification and successfully had the classification upgraded to R18+ with no cuts. In January 1998 it broadcast twice on midnights on the new Teletoon station in Canada along with episodes of the Macross Plus OVA series.

In 2000 when Manga and Madman Entertainment released Ninja Scroll on DVD, Madman mistakenly used the UK cut of the film instead of using the uncut Australian version. This was rectified in 2004 when Manga Entertainment released the 10th Anniversary Special Edition of Ninja Scroll into western countries, and both Australia and the UK received Ninja Scroll uncut and remastered from a PAL VHS source. In Canada the film was given an 18A rating, while it was released Unrated in the United States. The film was released on Blu-ray in Japan on May 23, 2012.

A 4K Restoration of the film produced by Sentai under supervision of Yoshiaki Kawajiri premiered at the 2026 Berlin Film Festival, later making an Australian premiere at the Melbourne International Film Festival on August 22, 2026, and was later screened theatrically in Australia and New Zealand by Sugoi Co on October 8, 2026.

== Soundtrack ==
Ninja Scroll

Soundtrack album by Kaoru Wada
- Released: December 3, 2003
- Genres: Film score, traditional Japanese music
- Length: 45:56 (CD); 45:00 (LP)
- Labels: ADV Music(2003); Milan Records (2015)

Professional ratings
Review scores
Source	Rating
Soundtrack Geek	69.2/100 link
Soundtrack Dreams	69/100 link

The film's score was composed by Kaoru Wada. In the United States, the soundtrack was originally released on CD in 2003 by ADV Music under licence from Toho with the title Jubei Ninpucho Ninja Scroll (Original Motion Picture Soundtrack). Following ADV's closure, Milan Records re-released the album in 2015 on CD and digital music formats. In 2016, Milan also released the album on LP with a slightly different track listing and cover art by Godzilla artist Yuji Kaida; this release was limited to 500 copies.

== Reception ==
Ninja Scroll won the Citizen's Award at the 1993 Yubari International Fantastic Film Festival. On review aggregator website Rotten Tomatoes, the film has a rating of 89%, based on 18 reviews, with an average rating of 7.4/10.

During the 1990s, Ninja Scroll was among the most popular anime movies outside Japan, along with such movies as Akira and Ghost in the Shell. The North American video release of Ninja Scroll had sold more than 70,000 copies by May 1996, becoming Manga Entertainment's best-selling title at the time. In February 2004, Cinefantastique listed the anime as one of the "10 Essential Animations".

Theron Martin from Anime News Network stated that the "action scenes sizzle with energy and powerful maneuvers unencumbered by tiresome dramatics" and further stated that the plot "mostly exists just to set up conflicts between the protagonists and the Devils of Kimon and allow various characters to show off their colorful ninja techniques". He concluded that "Ninja Scroll's story is too thin for it to ever legitimately be considered one of the all-time great anime movies" but considers it to be a classic. He stated that the dubbed English version, which he stated has "slightly more attitude and some distinctive vocal styling mixed in with an occasional awkward emphasis", is "very faithful" script-wise to the original Japanese version and that it still "holds its own" in 2012.

In 2012, Robbie Collin of The Telegraph ranked it three of five stars, explaining that "Its baroque sadism and sexism hasn't aged well, but it still packs a visceral kick."

== Legacy ==
=== Anime series ===
A Japanese animated television series named Ninja Scroll: The Series aired in Japan in 2003 and ran for 13 episodes. The series is a stand-alone sequel to the film; however, many references suggest that it is indeed a continuation. In the series, Jubei gets caught in the middle of a battle between the Kimon clan and the Hiruko clan. He meets up with the Light Maiden Shigure, a young lady whose village was destroyed by the Kimon clan and whom Jubei was charged with delivering a Dragon Stone to. The duo are joined by Tsubute (a young thief) and Dakuan (Tokugawa shogunate spy), and together they try to find out why both the Kimon and the Hiruko clan are after her and why the Dragon Stone she carries is so important to them. The show was directed by Tatsuo Sato (Martian Successor Nadesico), with character design done by Takahiro Yoshimatsu (Trigun).

=== Sequel ===
In August 2008, Madhouse announced that an official sequel was in the works with Kawajiri returning to write and direct. In July 2012, the studio released a teaser trailer for a "three-episode short animation" titled Ninja Scroll Burst, intended to attract investors to the project. In February 2014, Madhouse CEO Hiroyuki Okada confirmed that Kawajiri had a finished script, tentatively titled Ninja Scroll Kocho (獣兵衛忍風帖 胡蝶, Jūbē Ninpūchō Kochō), and that production would move ahead as soon as financing had been secured. He also divulged that the studio was experiencing difficulty finding investors due to the fact that the original film was "not a big hit in Japan". As of 2019, the project remains in limbo.

In North America, the Ninja Resurrection original video animation was marketed as a sequel to Ninja Scroll, but was actually based on an unrelated story and created by a different animation studio. The only similarity is a lead character with the given name "Jubei".

=== Comics ===
In September 2006, WildStorm launched a 12-issue Ninja Scroll comic-book series written by J. Torres, which follows the further adventures of Jubei.

==== Live-action adaptation ====
In October 2008, it was reported that Warner Bros. had acquired the rights to develop a live-action adaptation of Ninja Scroll, with Leonardo DiCaprio's Appian Way Productions, Madhouse, and Japanese producer Jungo Maruta also involved in the project. Screenwriter Alex Tse, who co-wrote the 2009 film Watchmen, was hired to write the screenplay. In April 2009, it was reported that DiCaprio would act as producer, and was considering casting the Japanese boy band SMAP in the lead roles. In October 2015, Dracula Untold director Gary Shore revealed he had once been attached to direct the film, releasing a proof of concept trailer he had produced with motion capture by 87Eleven and animation by The Third Floor. As of 2018, the production remains in development hell.
