= Tsumaki Hiroko =

Japanese noblewoman (1530–1576)

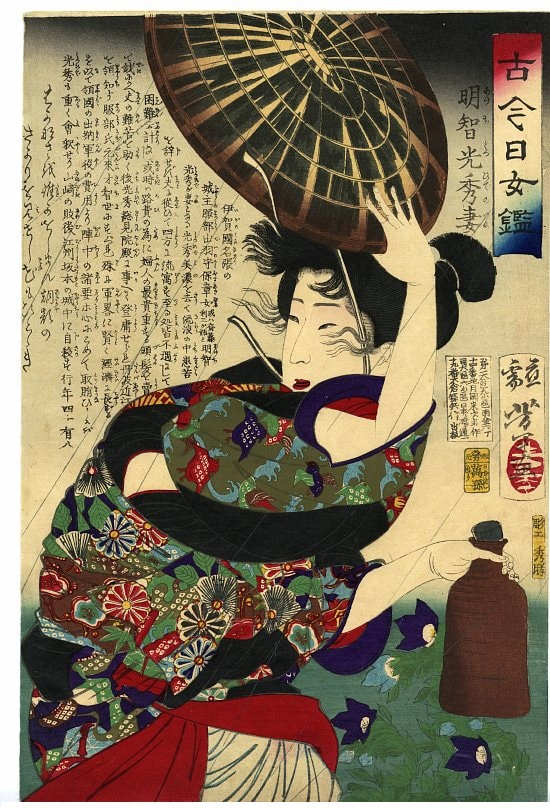
Tsumaki Hiroko hurrying through the rain by Tsukioka Yoshitoshi (1839–1892)

Tsumaki Hiroko (妻木煕子, 1530 – November 27, 1576) was a Japanese noble woman from the Sengoku period. She is also known as Omaki-no-kata, Omaki and Fuseya-hime, with her real name uncertain. The name Hiroko probably originated from her father's name Tsumaki Norihiro. She was the wife of Akechi Mitsuhide, a prominent general of the Oda clan, and the mother of Hosokawa Gracia, a famous Christian convert. She played a pivotal role in Mitsuhide's early career and in stabilizing the Akechi clan, which would later be responsible for one of the most impactful events in Japanese history: the murder of Oda Nobunaga in the Honnoji Incident.

Hiroko was the subject of a haiku by Matsuo Bashō, which reads "Tsuki sabi yo / Akechi ga tsuma no / hanashisen" ("Moon be sad / of the wife of Akechi / let us speak"). The sadness could be a reference to the common story that Hiroko died as a result of nursing her husband through a serious disease, which she herself then caught. However, since Japanese commentaries on the poem do not mention her death, the sadness seems to instead from the sacrifice of her own personal dreams which was required to support her husband.

== Life ==
Tsumaki Hiroko born as the daughter of Tsumaki Norihiro, castellan of Tsumaki Castle. While the date of her birth is unknown, based on one theory, she was born as the eldest daughter around 1530. She betrothed Akechi Mitsuhide in 1545. However, she later had smallpox and her entire body remained pockmarked. It is said that her father Norihiro sent her sister, who was very much like Hiroko, to Mitushide disguised as Hiroko, but Mitsuhide found out and rejected her, preferring to marry Hiroko.

During her marriage she gave birth to Hosokawa Gracia, a Christian convert who became a popular figure in Japanese history. Hiroko was a determined woman who actively engaged in helping the Akechi clan. Her devotion to her family was immortalized in stories, paintings and popular culture.

In 1556, Mitsuhide supported Saitō Dōsan at the Battle of Nagaragawa. There is an anecdote that, after Saitō Yoshitatsu (the eldest son of Dōsan who was in an internal conflict with him) toppled Akechi Castle, Mitsuhide carried a pregnant Hiroko on his back while fleeing to Echizen Province. When Mitsuhide and Hiroko fled to Echizen, they asked to serve Asakura Yoshikage. Despite going through difficult times, Mitsuhide organized a renga (linked verse poetry) event. Hiroko was aware of the struggles Mitsuhide faced in preparing for the feast and sold her own black hair to cover expenses.

Hiroko's relationship with Mitsuhide was genuine, he refused any offer to have a concubine. This relationship has proven strong since she helped Mitsuhide through his hard days - the surrender of the homeland castle, the ronin (masterless) life, serving the Asakura clan, the Ashikaga clan and the Oda clan.

== Death ==
In 1576, Hiroko fell ill. Mitsuhide requested prayers from a Shintō priest for her convalescence. She recovered after ten days, so silver pieces were donated to give thanks at the shrine. Kanemi paid a visit to Hiroko at the quarters of Mitsuhide in Kyōto to wish for her continuing recovery and met with Mitsuhide.

There are several theories about her death, the first is said that she desperately nursed Mitsuhide when he suffered from a serious illness, but she died due to the nursing fatigue. However, some says that she died in 1582 when the Sakamoto Castle fell during the Battle of Yamazaki.

Her grave is in Saikyo-ji Temple in Otsu City, Shiga Prefecture, the family temple of the Akechi clan and Tsumaki clan.
