= Igagoe vendetta =

17th century Japanese vendetta

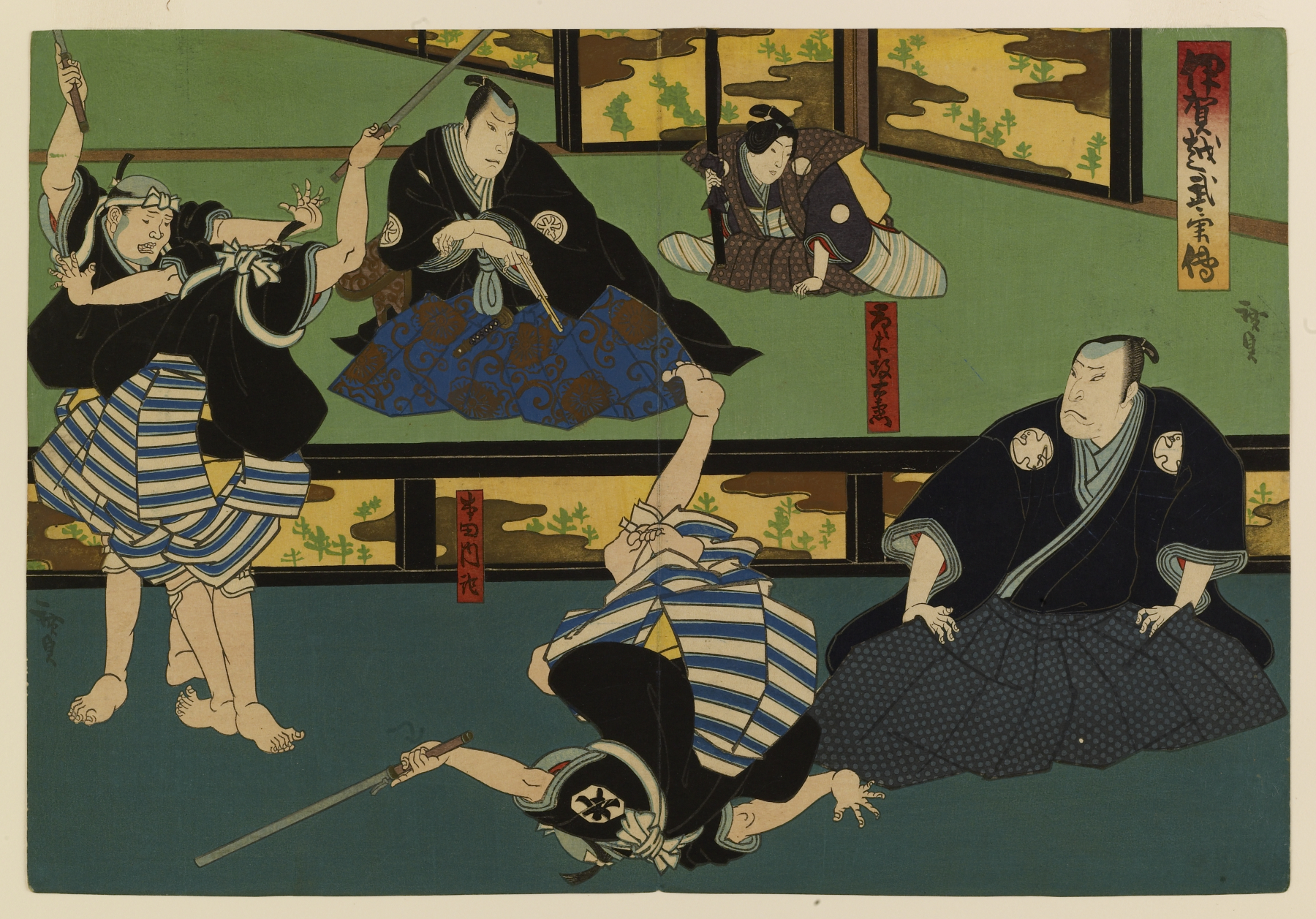
- Two swordsmen with blunt swords are locked in combat, and a third has taken a tumble. This is an episode from a popular story based on the Igagoe revenge, first performed in 1777. Print by Konishi Hirosada, c. 1850.
- Native name: 鍵屋の辻の決闘
- Date: 7 November 1634
- Location: Iga-Ueno
- Type: Revenge attack
- Cause: Murder of Watanabe Gendayū
- Target: Kawai Matagorō
- Organised by: Watanabe Kazuma and his brother-in-law Araki Mataemon
- Outcome: Revenge successful
- Arrests: unknown

The Igagoe vendetta was a vengeance incident in Japan in 1634, where the murder of a retainer was avenged by his older brother. The event happened in the town of Iga-Ueno near Iga Pass. The vendetta is known as one of the three major vendetta incidents in Japan, alongside the Revenge of the Soga Brothers and the Akō vendetta (by the forty-seven rōnin).

== History ==
In 1630, in the fiefdom of Okayama, Watanabe Gendayū, a favorite retainer of Ikeda Tadao, was murdered by Kawai Matagorō "because he had rebuffed Matagorō's amorous advances". Becoming a murderer out of jealousy for a childhood friend, Kawai Matagoro fled to the Edo city where hatamoto Ando Masayoshi sheltered him. Tadao tried to bring him to justice, but failed. When Tadao died in 1632, he asked: "For my memorial service, above everything else offer on my behalf the head of Kawai Matagorō." After that Kawai Matagorō was officially ordered by bakufu to exile. As it was the shogun's orders, a samurai had to submit to preserve the honor of the family. This gave Gendayū‘s older brother Watanabe Kazuma an opportunity for revenge. He was 18 years old at the time; he discharged from the Ikeda family for whom he served and began his search for Kawai Matagoro. Watanabe eventually located him in the neighborhood of Iga-Ueno. By now, Watanabe Kazuma had been joined in his revenge by his sister's husband, famous swordsman Araki Mataemon.

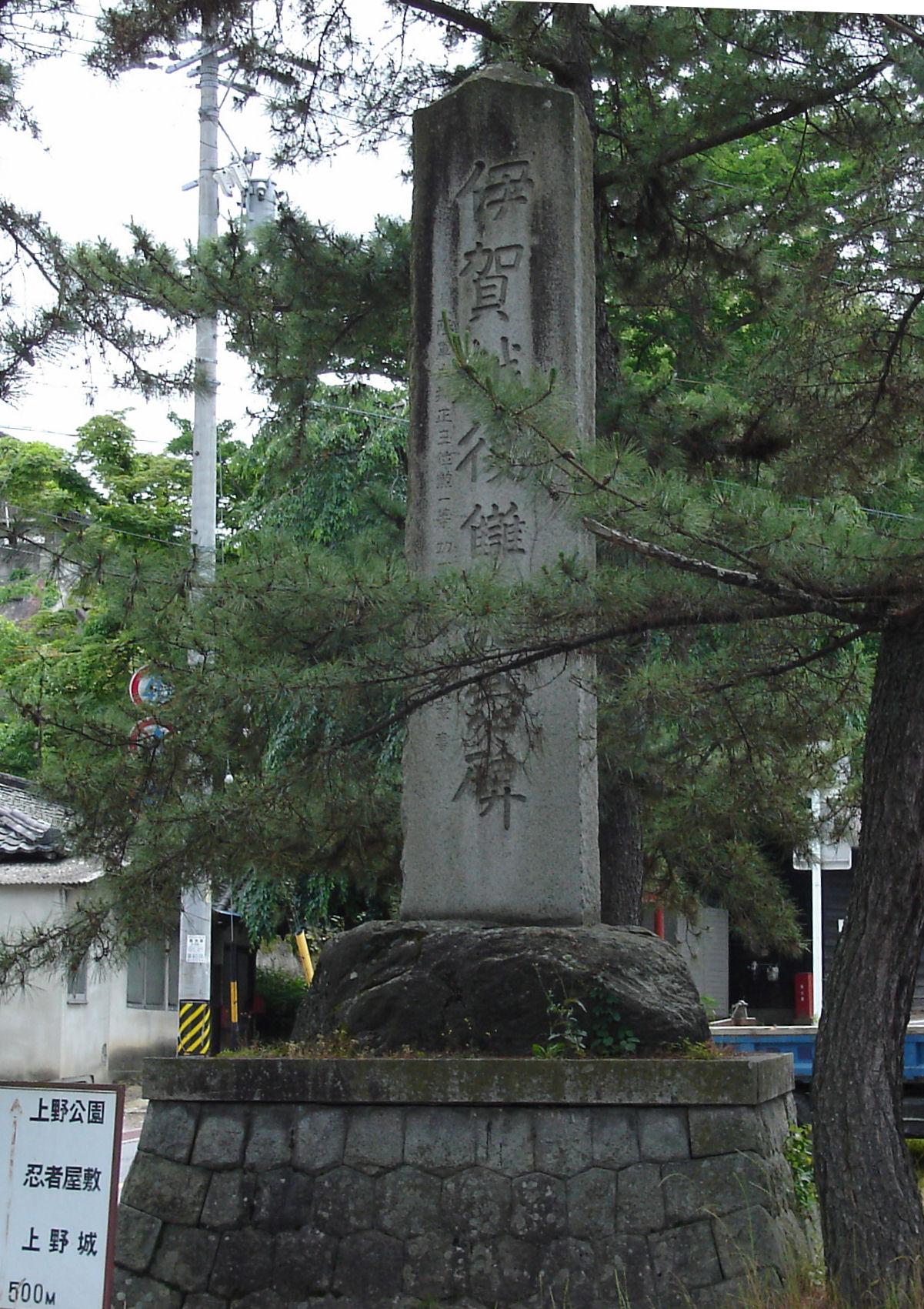
Igagoe vendetta monument

"On the seventh day of the eleventh month of 1634", Watanabe Kazuma, Araki Mataemon, and two other men waited for Kawai Matagoro at the Kagiya crossroads in Iga-Ueno. They had been informed of Matagoro's route from Osaka. Mataemon and his followers waited for Matagoro in a nearby shop. When they arrived, Mataemon killed Matagoro's uncle, Kawai Jinzaemon, and the followers who surrounded Matagoro. Historian Stephen Turnbull wrote, that:

The story was eventually to grow to put the number slain by Mataemon at 36, but this is certainly exaggerated. Mataemon may have been the better swordsman, but he had no intention of killing Matagoro. Kazuma was the one to do that, as the law demanded, so Mataemon pushed Matagoro to Kazuma's side. He himself patiently joined his companions and did not invite them to join in. The Igagoe Vendetta was to be a duel between Kazuma and Matagoro, and nothing must inconvenience it, nor must there be any unnecessary deaths. The duel between Kazuma and Matagoro continued for six hours [...] Both became so weakened in mind and body that they could not even see their opponent. Nevertheless, Mataemon still did not intervene. In a hoarse voice, he encouraged Kazuma, and at one point was able to head off Matagoro from escaping. Discipline was also maintained by Matagoro's men, who had supported him during his exile. It was equally necessary for their side to be seen to be behaving according to the law and the dictates of samurai honor. If Matagoro behaved properly, he might receive a pardon and regain the daimye authority following a victory. So he made a desperate effort. [...] Then suddenly Kazuma struck home on Matagoro, and just before Matagoro had a chance to respond, Kazuma's sword cut an artery. As Matagoro fell, Kazuma dealt him a final blow to the neck. The law had priority to the bitter end. Mataemon and the others carried out the appropriate procedures afterwards and surrendered themselves to the local daimyo.

Vendetta needed to be reported to a government to be regarded a lawful action, or all the participants were cast as criminals. The participants of Igagoe vendetta weren't regarded as criminals, so it was probably reported as the law commanded. "The full story [...] eventually involved not only lower-ranking samurai but the more exalted lords, or daimyo, of at least two feudal domains, and eventually the Tokugawa central government in Edo [...] The whole incident and the vendetta that followed were deemed of sufficient importance that they were recorded in the official chronicle of the central government, The True History of the Tokugawa (Tokugawa Jikki)."

== In culture ==
Igagoe vendetta in ukiyo-e prints

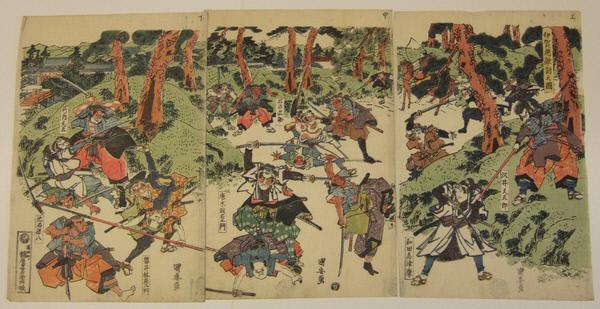
Kuniyasu, Igagoe Vendetta, c.1815-1820

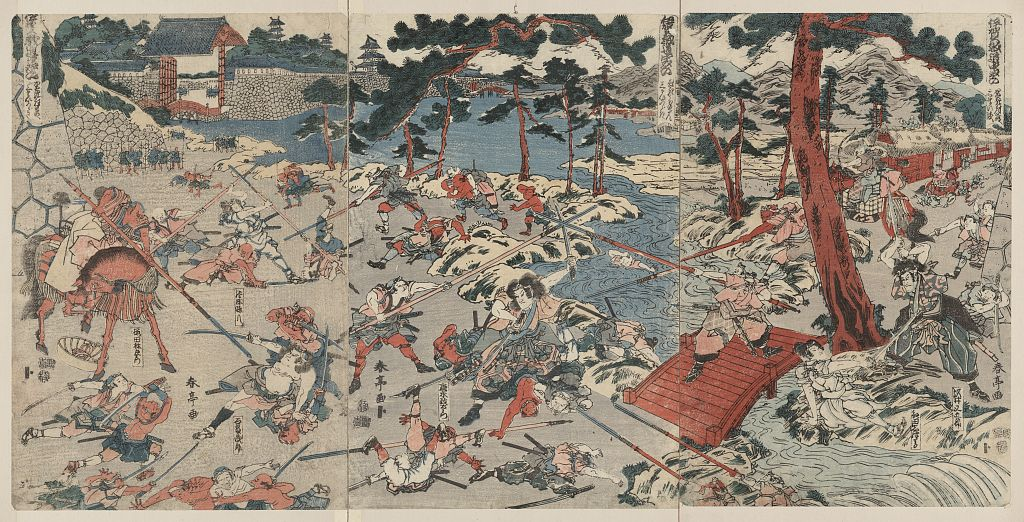
Katsukawa Shuntei, Igagoe Dochusugoroku, 1811
Woodblock triptych print, oban tate-e. Sakuragi Rinzaemon fleeing on horseback (left), his followers chased by Karaki Masaemon (c, r), while others are engaged by Ishidome Busuke (right); in the background are Ubudai Rekishiro (left) racing to the assistance of Ikezoe Magohachi (centre) who is engaged with Azumaki Kurobei, and Sawai Matagoro with Wada Shizuma. Print by Utagawa Kuniyoshi.

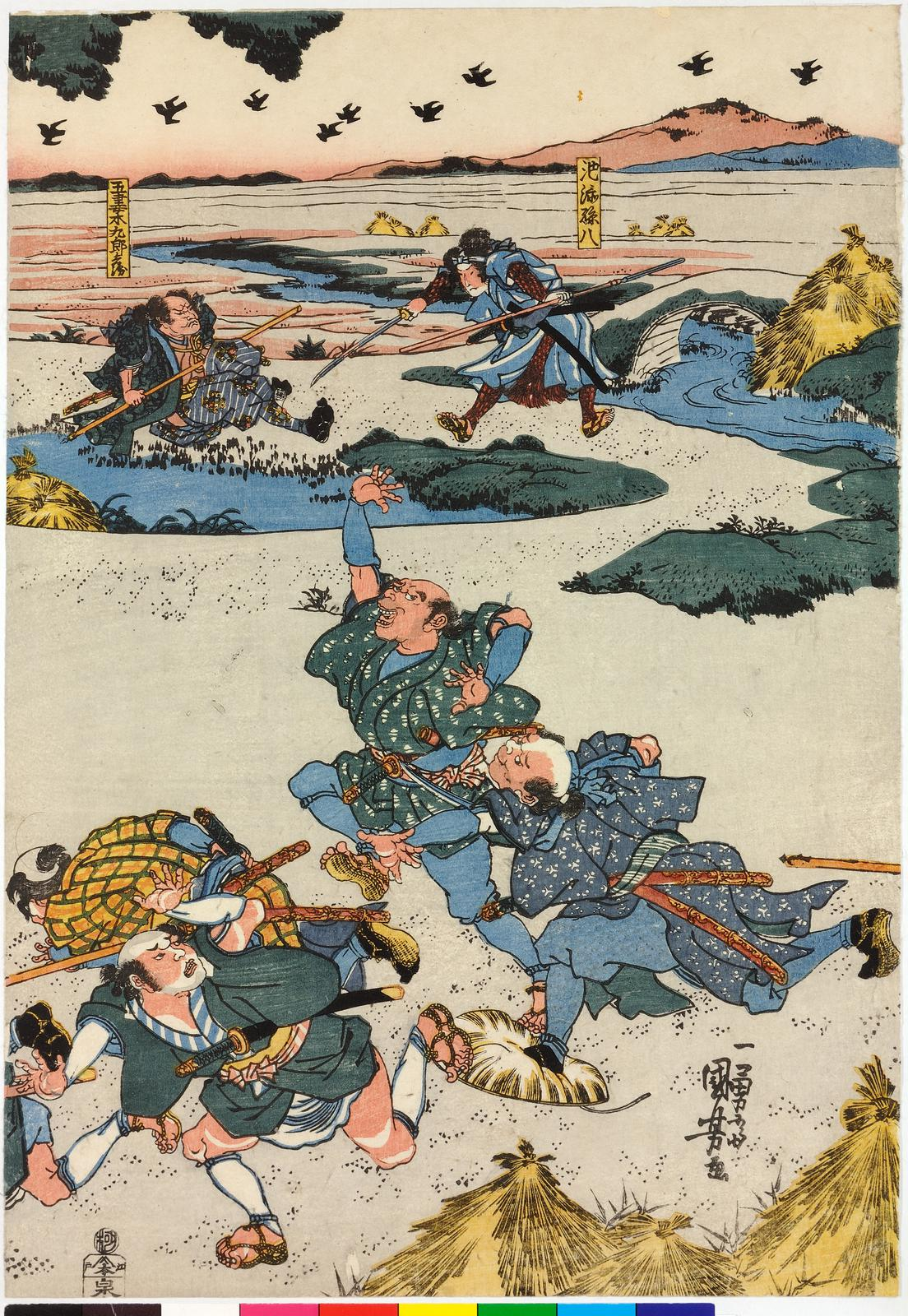

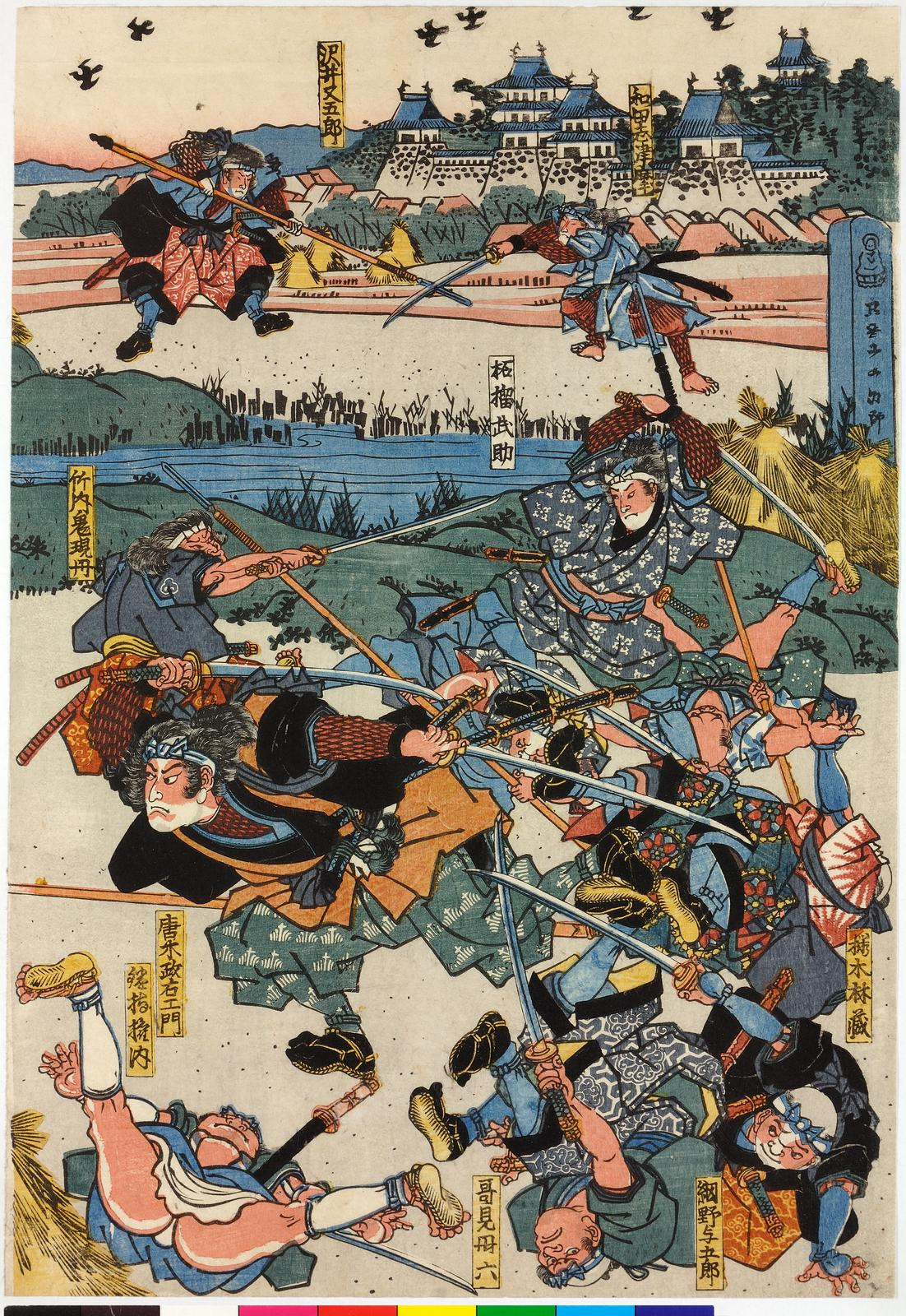

The event was told in several novels, plays, and movies.

=== Kabuki ===
- "Igagoe Dochu Sugoroku"

=== Movies ===
- To the Hills of Glory, 1925
- Vendetta for a Samurai, 1952

For the full list see Japanese article ja:鍵屋の辻の決闘.
