= Johann Bernhard Staudt =

Johann Bernhard Staudt (October 23, 1654 – November 6, 1712) was an Austrian Jesuit composer.

Son of a musician born in Wiener Neustadt. Since 1684 choir master ("regens chori") at the Professhaus of the Jesuits in Vienna. Between 1684 and 1707 he composed at least 42 Jesuit dramas. His chamber opera Patientis Christi Memoria ("Memory of the Suffering of Christ") was composed 1685. It had lain unperformed for over three centuries when it was revived by Boston College in 2003 after being discovered in the National Library of Austria. In 1698, he composed the music for the Jesuit drama Mulier fortis which refers to the life of the Japanese noblewoman Hosokawa Gracia (1563 – 1600) who has been baptized by Portuguese missionaries and was forced by her husband to commit suicide.
