= Kuniyasu =

Japanese artist (1794–1832)

Utagawa Kuniyasu (歌川 国安; 1794–1832) was a Japanese artist best known for his prints in the ukiyo-e style as a member of the Utagawa school.

== Life and career ==
Few details are known of Kuniyasu's life. He was born in 1794 and had the given name Yasugorō. His teacher was the Utagawa school master Toyokuni.

Kuniyasu's earliest surviving work is his illustrations to the book Hanashi no momochidori (噺の百千鳥). He illustrated about a hundred books throughout his career, and designed hundreds of stand-alone prints of beauties (bijin-ga) and actors (yakusha-e).

Kuniyasu also used the art names Ippōsai and Nishikawa Yasunobu. He died at age 39 in the seventh month of 1832. Works of his continued to be issued following his death, which may suggest they were popular.

His work is held in the permanent collections of several museums worldwide, including the Indianapolis Museum of Art, the Victoria and Albert Museum, the Philadelphia Museum of Art, the Museum of Fine Arts, Boston, the Weatherspoon Art Museum, the British Museum, the University of Michigan Museum of Art, the Van Gogh Museum, the Cooper Hewitt, and the Metropolitan Museum of Art.

Prints by Utagawa Kuniyasu

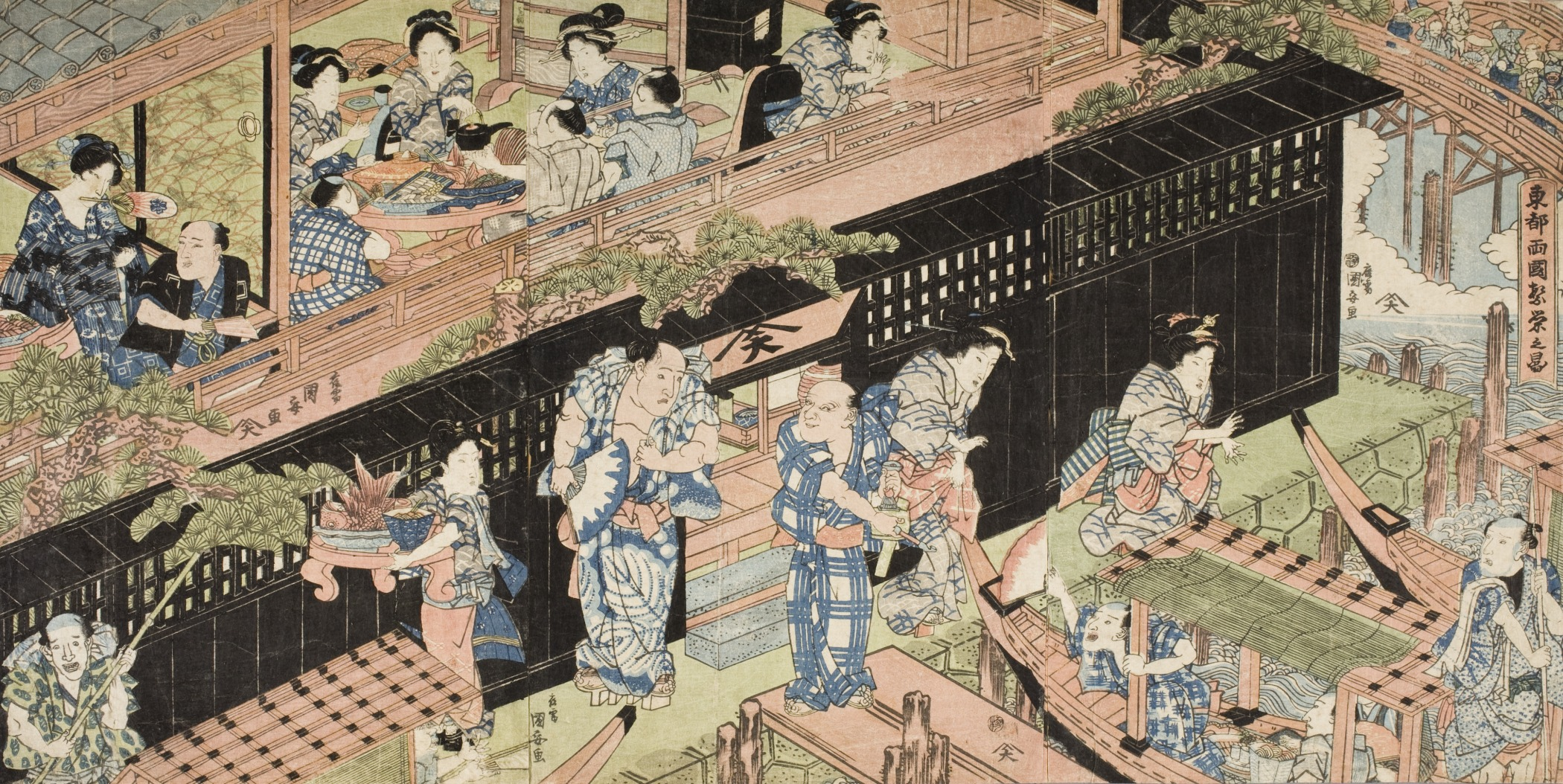
Crowds at Ryōgoku, c. 1820

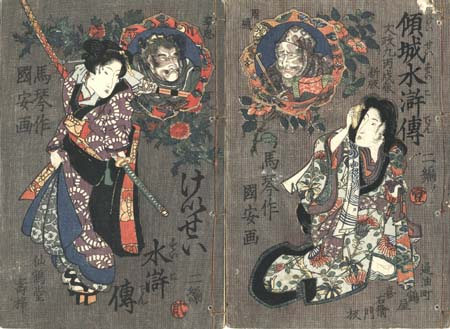
From Keisei Suikoden, 1826

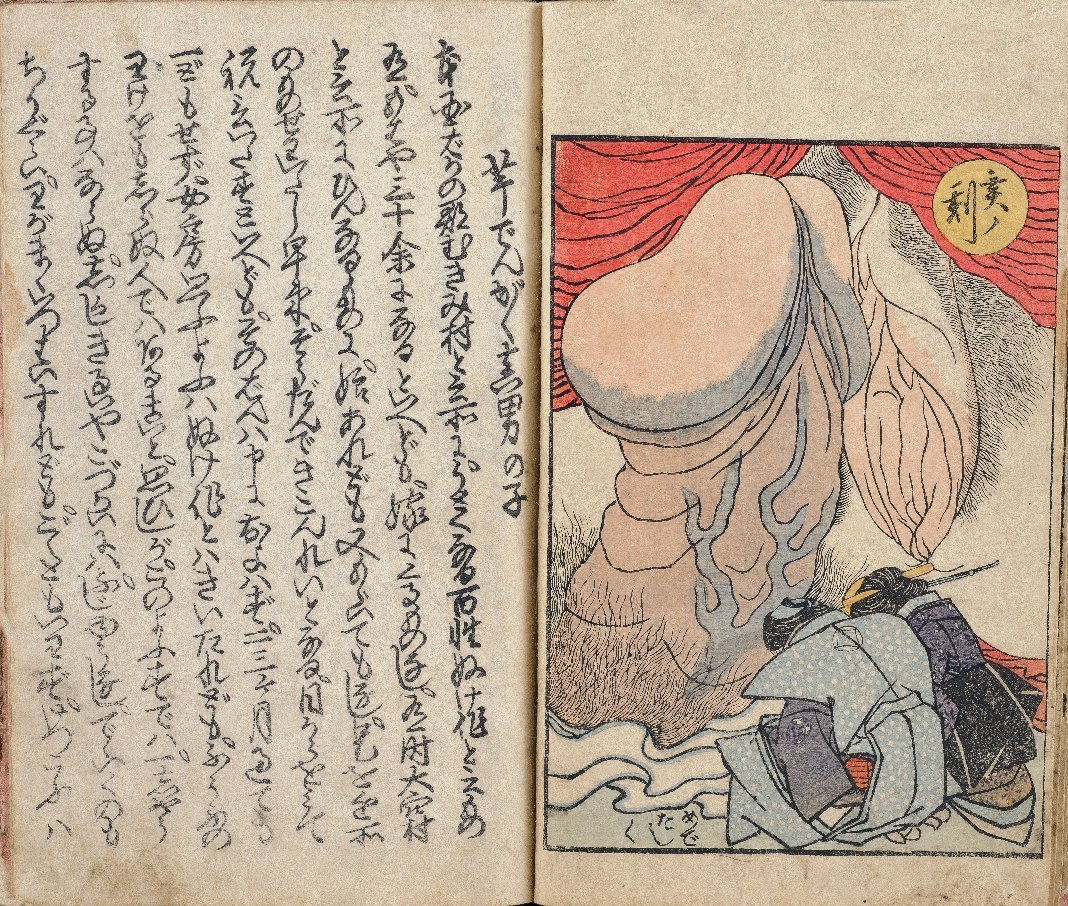
The Harbor of Love On the Island of Women, 1830

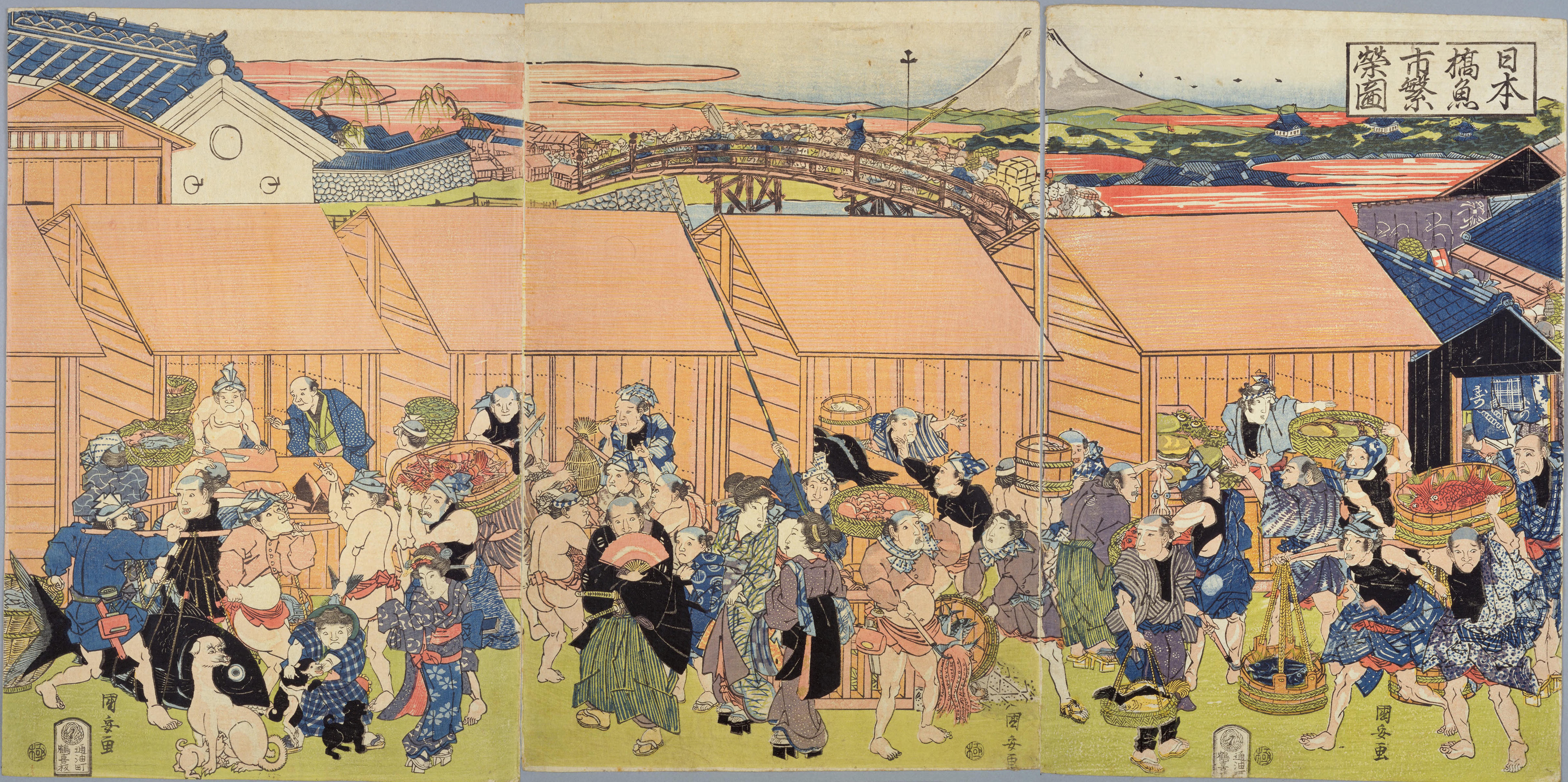
Nihonbashi Fish Market Prosperity

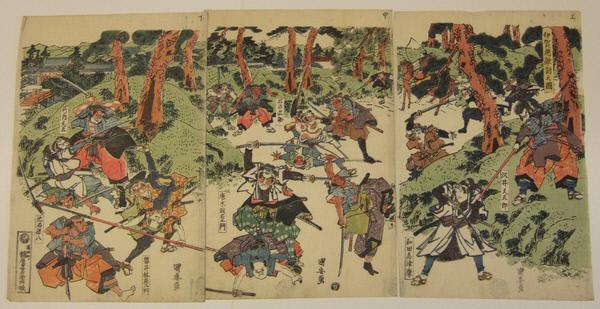
Igagoe vendetta, c.1815-1820
