= Kōtō-in =

Buddhist sub-temple in Kyoto, Japan

Coordinates: 35°02′35″N 135°44′36″E

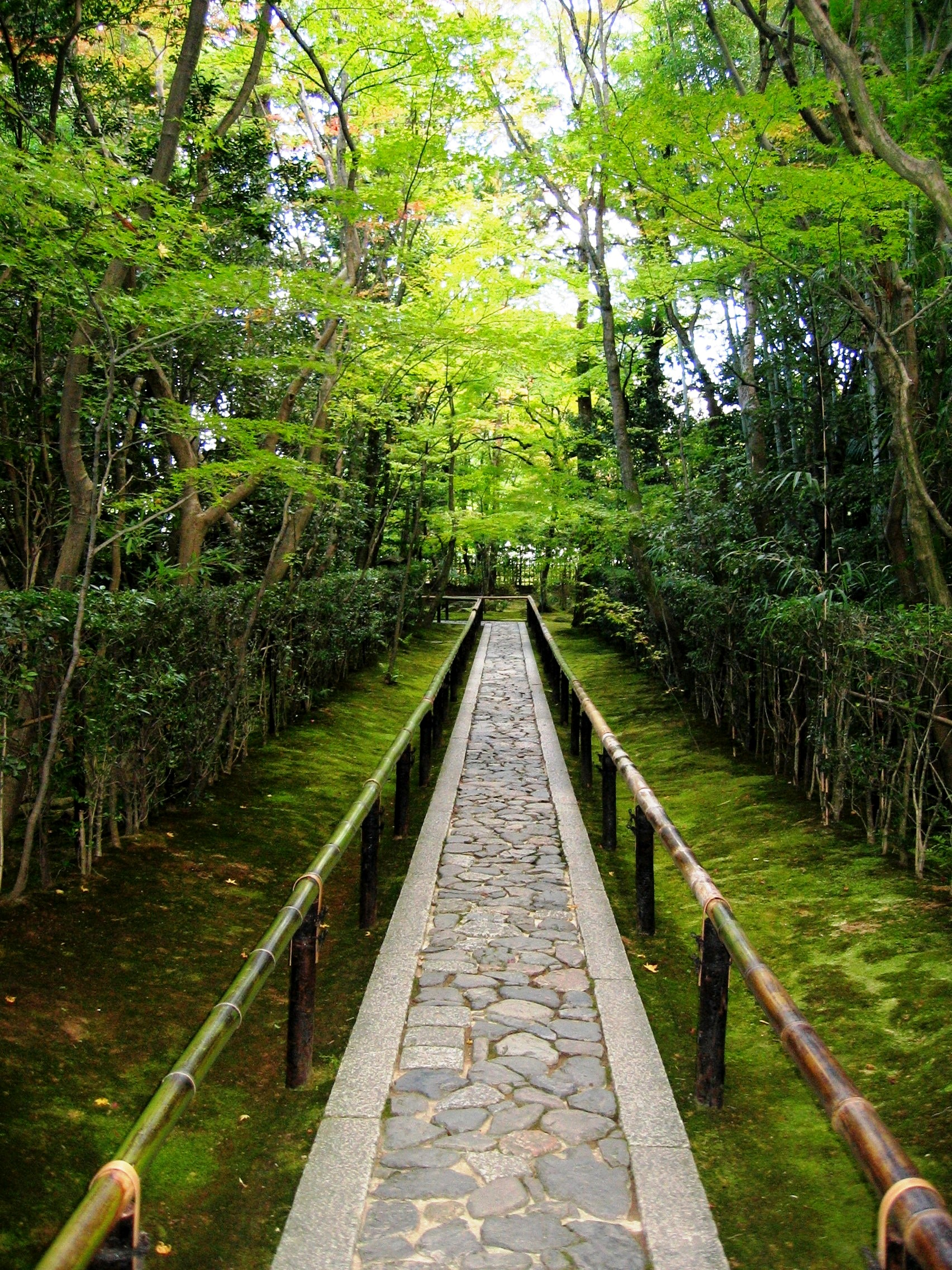
Entrance to Kōtō-in, a sub-temple of Daitoku-ji

Kōtō-in (高桐院) is a sub-temple of Daitoku-ji, Kyoto, Japan. It was founded by Hosokawa Tadaoki. There is a teahouse, the Shōkō-ken, and the gardens are celebrated for their momiji. A pair of Southern Song monochrome hanging scrolls with landscape have been designated a National Treasure. Many other works are aired annually in October.

== See also ==
- Daitoku-ji
- List of National Treasures of Japan (paintings)
