= Hosokawa Gracia =

Member of the Akechi family during the Sengoku period

- 細川ガラシャ
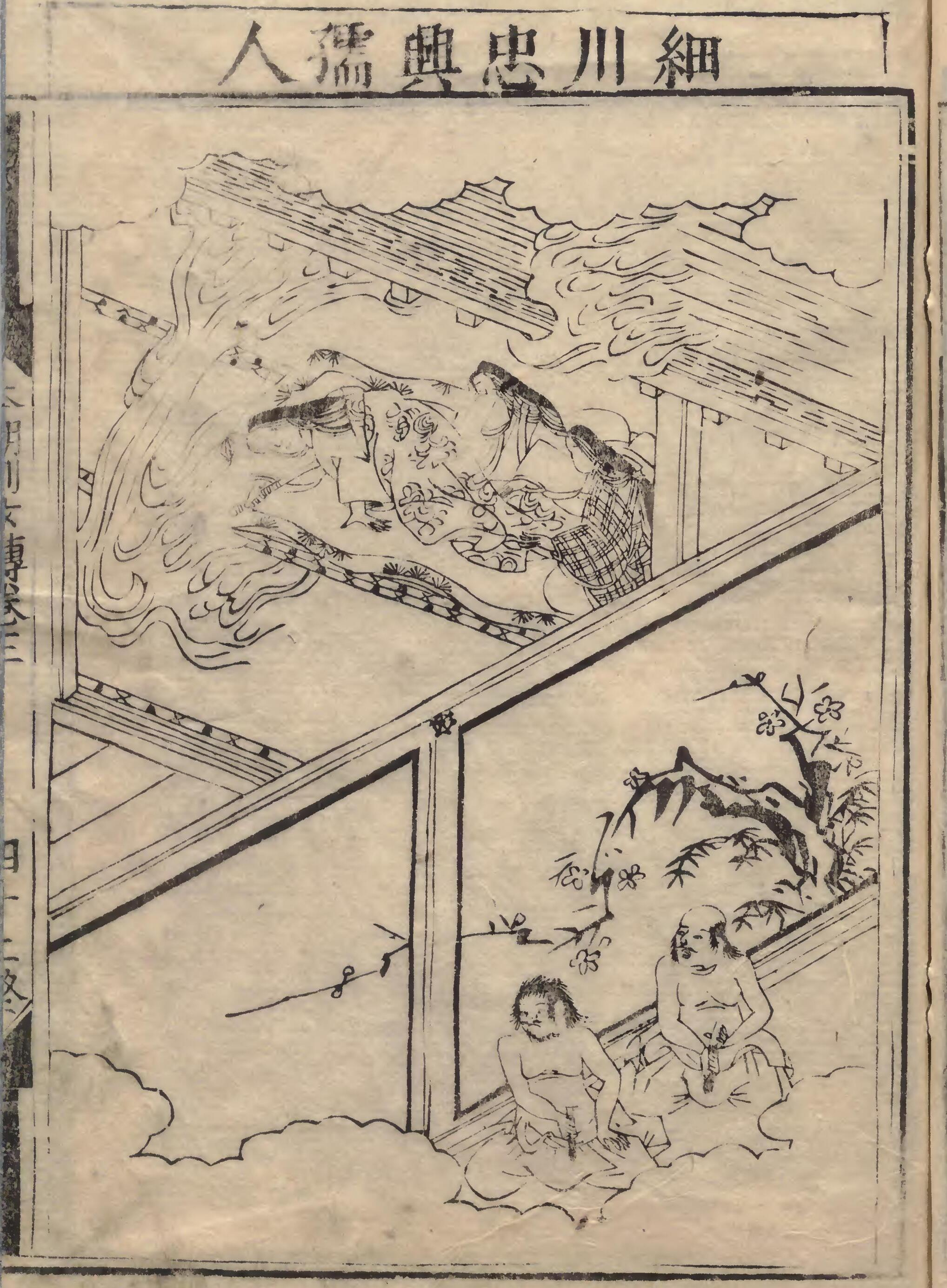
- Born: Akechi Tama (明智たま, Akechi Tama); 1563; Echizen Province, Japan
- Died: August 1600 (aged 36–37); Osaka, Japan
- Cause of death: killed by Ogasawara Shōsai under Gracia's request
- Resting place: Sozenji (Osaka, Japan); 34.733778°N 135.5085°E
- Other names: Akechi Tama (明智玉, Akechi Tama), Akechi Tama (明智珠, Akechi Tama), Akechi Tamako (明智玉子, Akechi Tamako), Akechi Tamako (明智珠子, Akechi Tamako), Shūrinin (秀林院, Shūrinin)
- Era: Sengoku period-Azuchi–Momoyama period
- Spouse: Hosokawa Tadaoki
- Children: Hosokawa Tadataka, Hosokawa Tadaaki, Hosokawa Tadatoshi
- Parents: Akechi Mitsuhide (father); Tsumaki Hiroko (mother)
- Relatives: Hosokawa Fujitaka (Uncle)

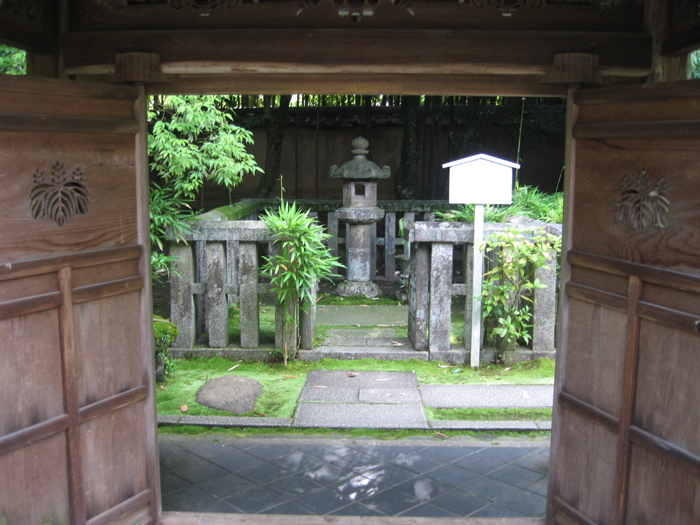
The grave of Hosokawa Gracia and Hosokawa Tadaoki, Kōtō-in, Daitoku-ji, Kyoto.

Akechi Tama (明智たま, Akechi Tama), usually referred to as Hosokawa Gracia (細川ガラシャ, Hosokawa Garasha), (1563 – 25 August 1600) was a member of the aristocratic Akechi family from the Sengoku period. Gracia is best known for her role in the Battle of Sekigahara; Ishida Mitsunari attempted to take her hostage to sway her husband, Hosokawa Tadaoki, into joining his side on the battle. She refused to commit suicide because of her Catholic faith, breaking the code of conduct imposed on women of the samurai class and causing a family retainer to kill her instead, possibly at her request.

She was the daughter of Akechi Mitsuhide and Tsumaki Hiroko, the wife of Hosokawa Tadaoki, and a convert to Catholicism. As the last notable survivor of the Akechi clan, the clan that planned and executed the assassination of Oda Nobunaga, the first "Great Unifier" of Japan, Gracia's death affected both armies. The incident did much damage to Ishida's reputation, which greatly reduced his chances of recruiting more allies, some of whom were also secretly Christians.

== Biography ==
She was named Akechi Tama or Tamako at birth; Garasha, the name by which she is known in history, is based upon her Catholic baptismal name, Gracia.

She married Hosokawa Tadaoki at the age of sixteen; the couple had five or six children. In the Sixth Month of 1582, her father Akechi Mitsuhide betrayed and killed his lord, Oda Nobunaga, making the teenage Tama a traitor's daughter. Not wishing to divorce her, Tadaoki sent her to the hamlet of Midono in the mountains of the Tango Peninsula (now in Kyoto Prefecture), where she remained hidden until 1584, until Toyotomi Hideyoshi requested that Tadaoki bring Tama to the Hosokawa mansion in Osaka, where she remained in confinement.

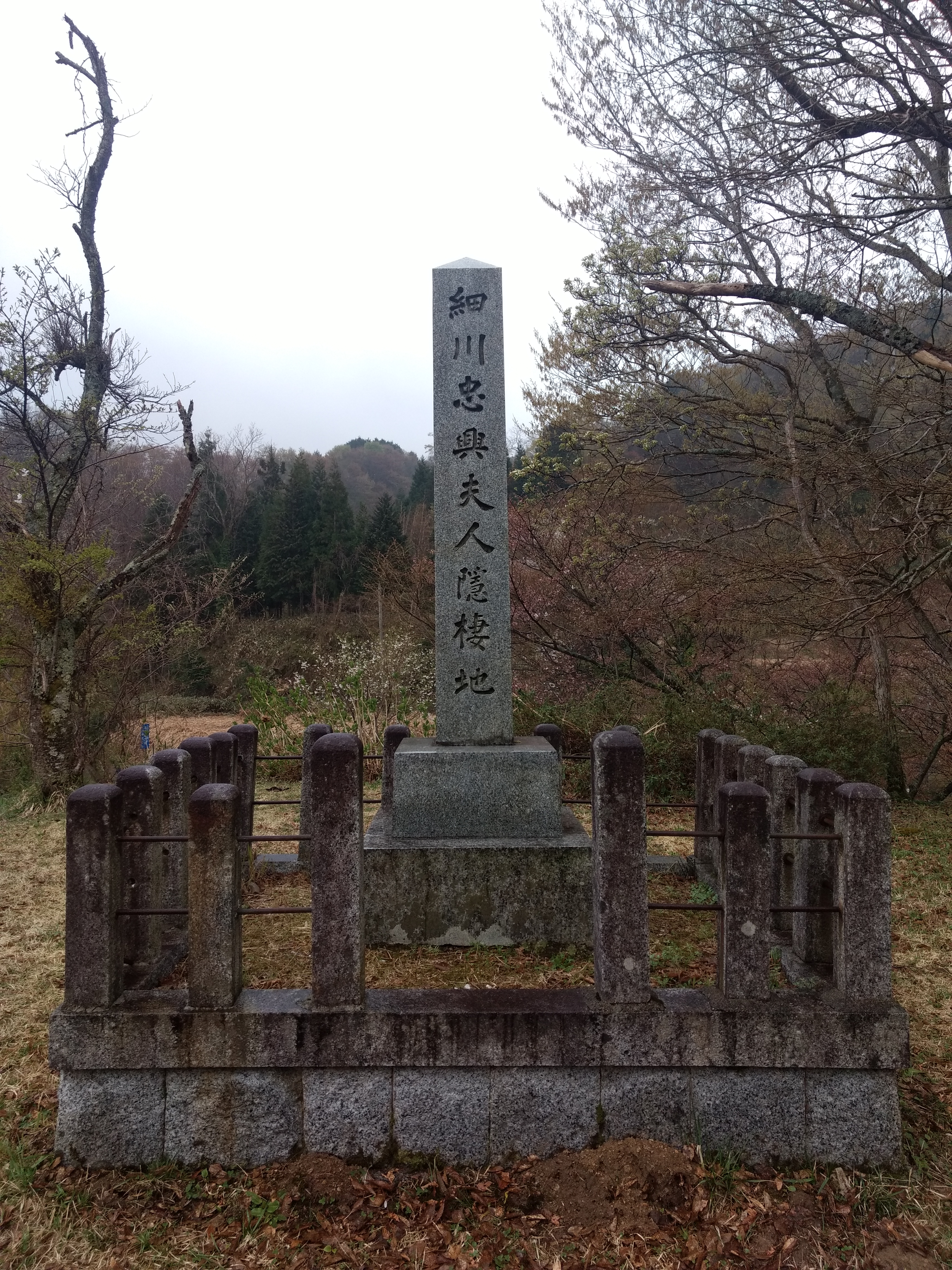
This monument in Kyoto Prefecture marks the area where Tama lived in hiding from 1582 to 1584.

Tama's maid, Kiyohara Kayo, baptized Maria, was from a Catholic family, and her husband repeated to her conversations with his Christian friend Takayama Ukon. In the spring of 1587 Tama managed to secretly visit the Osaka church; a few months later, when she heard that Toyotomi Hideyoshi had issued a proclamation against Christianity, she was determined to be baptized immediately. As she could not leave the house, she was baptized by her maid and received the Christian name "Gracia". She is said to have studied both Latin and Portuguese and to have read and become fascinated with Thomas à Kempis' The Imitation of Christ.

In 1595, Tadaoki's life was in danger because of his friendship with Toyotomi Hidetsugu, and he told Gracia that if he should die she must kill herself. When she wrote asking the priests about the plan, they informed her that suicide was a grave sin. However, the danger passed.

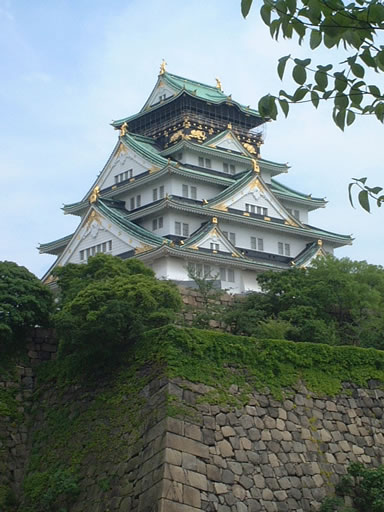
Reconstruction of Hideyoshi's Osaka Castle. (The Hosokawa mansion was just south of the castle.)

The death of Hideyoshi in 1598 left a power vacuum with two rival factions forming: Tokugawa Ieyasu in the east and Ishida Mitsunari in the west. When Ieyasu went to the east in 1600 leading a large army, including Tadaoki, his rival Ishida took over the impregnable castle in Osaka, the city where the families of many of Hideyoshi's generals resided. Ishida devised a plan to take the family members hostage, thus forcing the rival generals either to ally with him or at least not to attack him.

However, when Ishida attempted to take Gracia hostage, the family retainer Ogasawara Shōsai killed her and then committed seppuku after lighting the mansion on fire. The outrage over her death was so great that Ishida was forced to abandon his plans. Most Japanese accounts state that it was Gracia's idea to order Ogasawara to kill her. However, these accounts were written many decades after the actual death of Gracia. The original Jesuit account written shortly after her death instead states Tadaoki had commanded the servants of his household to kill Gracia if her honor were ever in danger. The servants had seen the attempted kidnapping as such, and acted on this order.

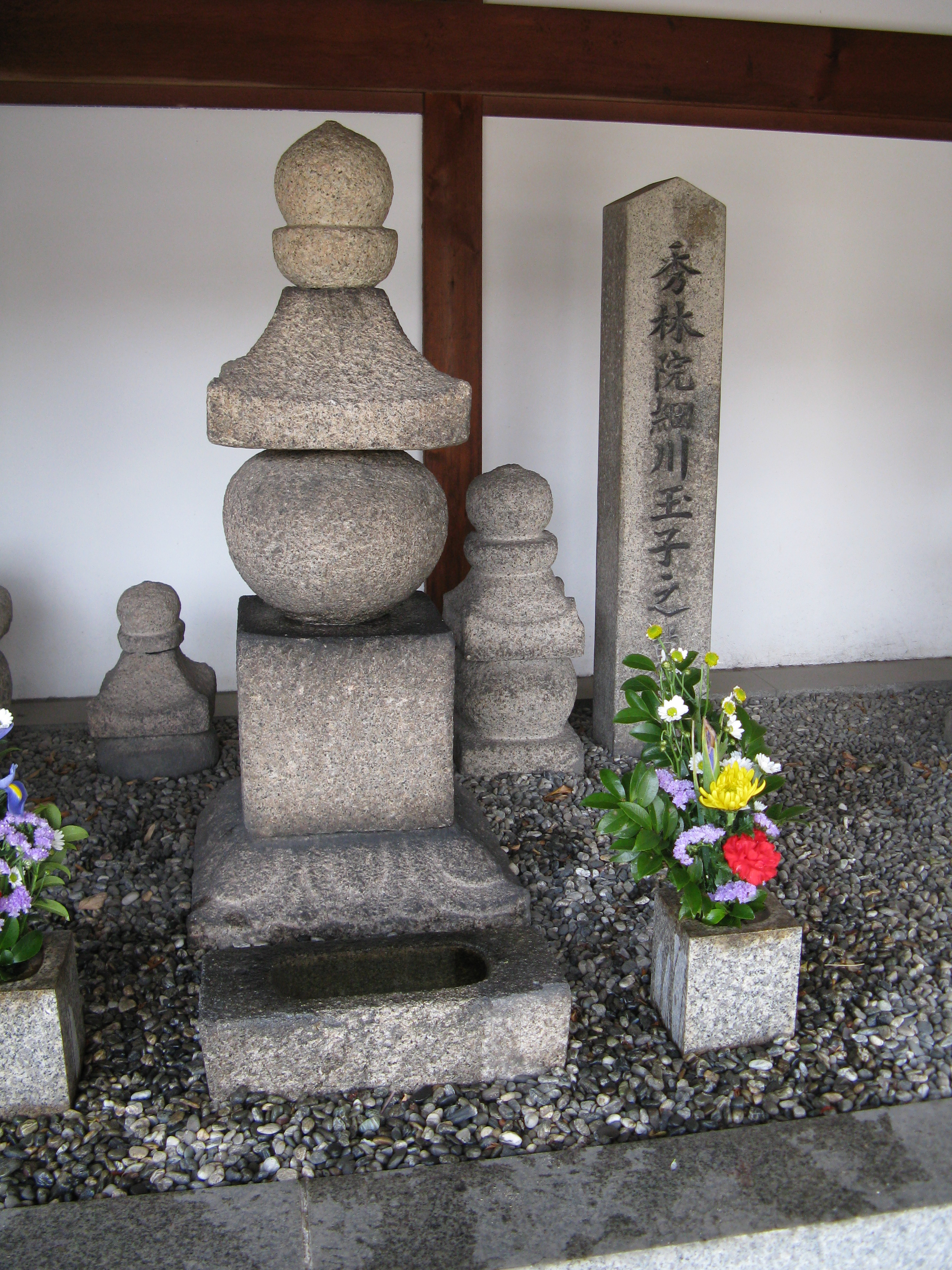
Gracia's grave at Sōzenji

A Catholic priest, Gnecchi-Soldo Organtino, had Gracia's remains gathered from the Hosokawa mansion and buried them in a cemetery in Sakai. Later, her remains were moved to Sōzenji, a temple in Osaka. Gracia also shares a grave with Tadaoki at Kōtō-in, a sub-temple of Daitoku-ji.

Gracia is an ancestor of former prime minister Morihiro Hosokawa.

== In historical fiction ==
Gracia frequently appears as a character in Japanese historical fiction, both novels and drama. One website lists her as a character in over 40 stage dramas, movies, TV dramas, etc., from 1887 to 2006. She is also frequently referred to in popular writing or talks on the history of the period. Ayako Miura's novel Hosokawa Garasha Fujin (English title: Lady Gracia: a Samurai Wife's Love, Strife and Faith) follows history fairly closely.

James Clavell used Gracia as the model for the character of Mariko Toda in his 1975 novel Shōgun. Additionally Clavell gave the Japanese wife of Vasco Rodrigues (whose Japanese name was Nyan-nyan) the baptismal name Gracia. This book was adapted for television as a miniseries in 1980 where Mariko was portrayed by Japanese actress Yoko Shimada, who had previously portrayed Gracia in the 1978 Japanese Taiga Drama series Ōgon no Hibi. Elements of Mariko's story follow Gracia's quite closely, although the manner of her death is different (Mariko threatens to commit suicide if she is not allowed to leave Osaka Castle and is then killed in a raid on her compound, thereby her death served the original purpose as her threatened suicide, enraging the other hostages) and the two characters do not fundamentally have anything in common. In the second television adaptation from 2024, Toda Mariko is played by Anna Sawai.

== In music ==
- Mulier fortis cuius pretium de ultimis finibus sive Gratia Regni Tango Regina exantlatis pro Christo aerumnis clara was composed by the Austrian composer Johann Bernhard Staudt in 1698.
- Hosokawa Grazia is a lyric opera in three acts, the first written in Japanese language. It was composed by the Italian missioner and musician don Vincent Cimatti. Represented as a lyric drama in words and songs in 1940, it was then written completely in music and played in the years 1960, 1965, 1966, 1967, 1989, 2004.

== Modern references ==
Gracia appears as a playable character in Koei's Samurai Warriors game series starting on Samurai Warriors 2 Xtreme Legends (2007). She is also playable in Warriors Orochi 3 (2011). She is a playable character in the post-credit story mode of the 2012 game Pokémon Conquest (Pokémon + Nobunaga's Ambition in Japan), with her partner Pokémon being Musharna and Gothitelle.

The city of Nagaokakyō, Kyoto hosts the Garasha Festival every November.

She appears as an event final boss in the 2015 browser game Touken Ranbu. She is also a prominent figure in the Stage: Touken Ranbu play Kiden: Ikusayu no Adabana, and makes an appearance in the spin-off Video Game Touken Ranbu Warriors.

Gracia appears as an antagonist in the 2025 game Assassin's Creed Shadows, where she is a member of the Templar Order within the game's lore.
