= Ogasawara Shōsai =

Japanese samurai

Ogasawara Shōsai (Japanese: 小笠原 少斎; died 1600) is most famous for killing Hosokawa Gracia to protect her honor when Ishida Mitsunari attempted to take her hostage. Afterwards, he and the rest of the household then committed seppuku and burned their mansion down.
