= Mori Sōiken =

One of the leaders of Shimabara Rebellion (died 1638)

Mori Sazaemon Sōiken (森 宗意軒; died April 12, 1638) was one of the leaders of the 1637-1638 Shimabara Rebellion in Japan. By the time of the rebellion he was a ronin, but he had formerly advised the Christian Daimyo Konishi Yukinaga.

== Popular culture ==
In Futaro Yamada's Makai Tenshō Mori survived the Shimabara Rebellion and learned a ninja art to resurrect Amakusa Shirō and Miyamoto Musashi.
