= Hōzōin Inshun =

Japanese monk and martial artist (1589–1648)

Hōzōin Zeneibō Inshun (宝蔵院 禅栄房胤舜, 1589 to February 5, 1648) was a monk and a martial artist who lived in the early Edo period. He was an Inju (the chief of a temple) of Hozoin Temple, which was a branch temple of Kōfuku-ji temple in Nara Prefecture. He was accomplished at the Hōzōin-ryū sōjutsu School of spearmanship, which was founded by Hōzōin In'ei and features the use of a Jumonji kama-yari (a cross-shaped spear with a sickle on both sides of the blade)

== Biography ==
Inshun was a descendant of a goshi (country samurai) in Yamashiro Province. He was In'ei's nephew and entered the Hōzōin in 1602 when In'ei was already an old man of 81 years. Inshun was not trained in Hōzōin-ryū sōjutsu by In'ei but instructed by an old monk from the Okuzōin (a monastery in the neighborhood of the Hōzōin temple), who had been Inei's direct disciple. One year prior to his death (in 1607) In'ei forbade sōjutsu training. This should have led to the extinction of at least the monastery line of the school. However, after In'ei's death, Inshun restarted his trainings and lifted the order. Inshun formed foundations for the prosperity of Hōzōin-ryū in the Edo period. He established Urajuippon shikimoku (裏十一本式目, eleven "back" techniques of the Hōzōin's spearmanship). Those 裏/"ura"/"back" techniques are contrasted with earlier fifteen 表/"omote"/"front" techniques, allegedly invented by In'ei himself. However, it is not certain if In'ei had written them down or if it was Inshun who arranged all the teachings. Inshun gathered talented disciples who motivated each other in growth and pursuit of the Hōzōin-ryū. Amongst them were Nakagawa Hannyū, Shibata Kaemon, Takada Matabee, Hasegawa Kuranosuke, Isono Shume and Tanaka Kanbee who were called the six Tengus. Hōzōin Kakushunbō Insei was Inshun's successor in the monasterial line of the school (the Hōzōin-ryū taught nowadays comes from the secular line of Takada Matabee). The graveyard where Inei, Inshun, and their successors are resting is located in the Byakugōji quarter of Nara. The members of modern Hōzōin-ryū are visiting and maintaining the graves.

In Japanese folklore, he (and Hōzōin-ryū school itself) is known the most for a legendary duel with Miyamoto Musashi, who came to Kōfuku-ji to fight with a member of the school. This portrayal of Inshun as Musashi's rival and of the duel appears in many modern popular media, such as the manga Vagabond, or games like Ryū ga Gotoku Kenzan!, and originate in Eiji Yoshikawa's novel Musashi. However, when historical Musashi visited Kofuku-Ji, Inei was 84 years old and Inshun 16. Whether due to the old age of the first headmaster of the Hōzōin-ryū or due to the youth of his successor the man who met Musashis challenge was Okuzōin Dōei. Later on in his life Musashi dueled (and won) with another Hōzōinryū user, Takada Matabee. That took place in Kokura in Buzen Province in 1632.
