= Araki Mataemon =

Japanese swordsman

- 荒木 又右衛門
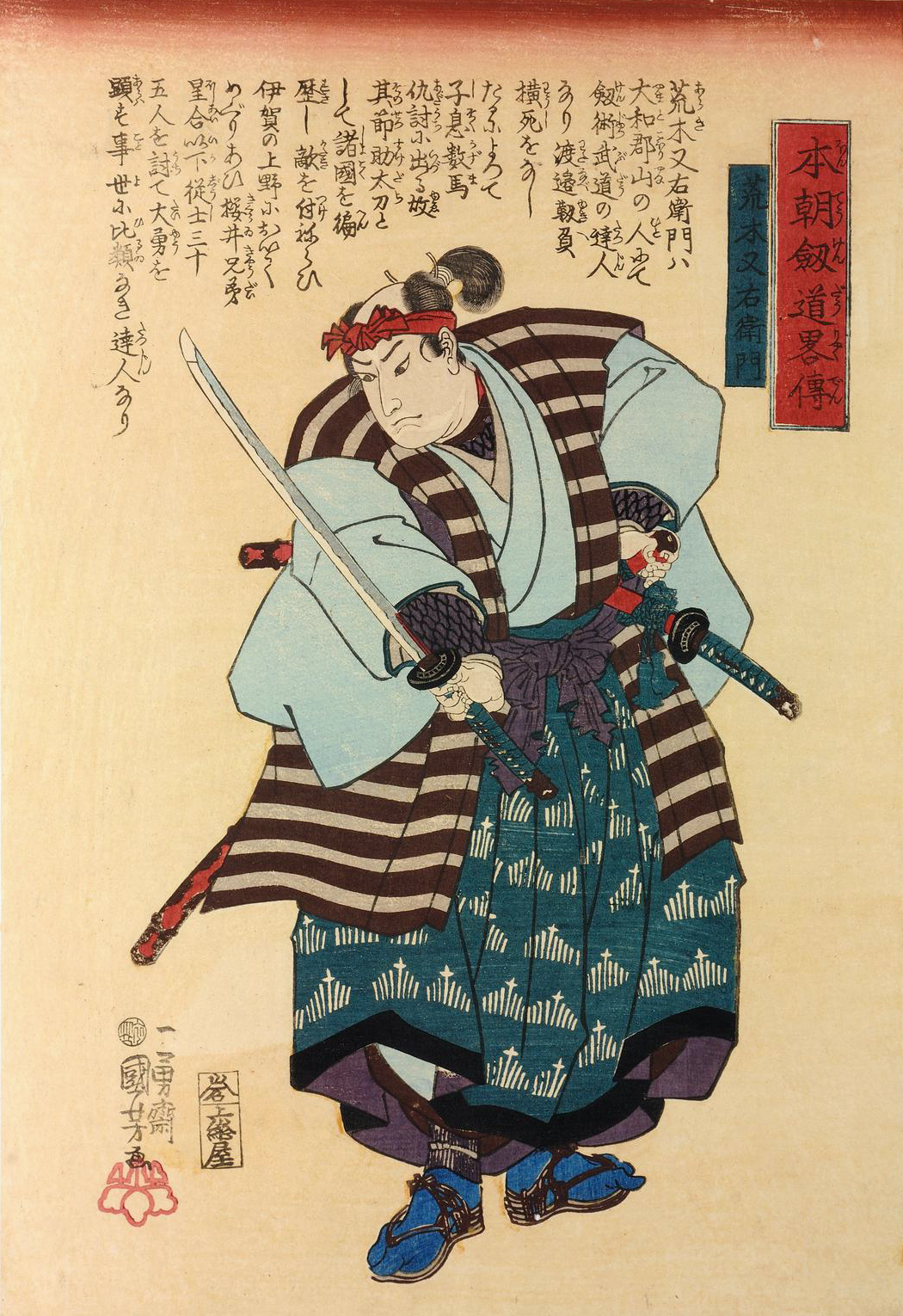
- Woodblock printing
- Born: 1598/1599
- Died: 1638
- Occupation: Samurai
- Known for: Martial art Yagyū Shingan-ryū

Araki Mataemon (荒木 又右衛門; 1598 / 1599 – October 5, 1638) was a Japanese samurai active in the early Edo period. Araki Mataemon was the founder of the koryū martial art Yagyū Shingan-ryū, known sometimes as Yagyū Shingan-ryū Taijutsu.

Araki Mataemon studied Yagyū Shinkage-ryū under Yagyū Munenori and later received permission from Yagyū Jūbei to use the Yagyū family-name in the Yagyū Shingan-ryū.

Araki Mataemon was a very strong warrior, and his feud against the samurai Kawai Matagorō is one of the most famous in Japan, called Igagoe vendetta. Matagoro killed Gendayu, the little brother of Mataemon's brother-in-law, Watanabe Kazuma. Becoming a murderer out of jealousy for a childhood friend, Matagoro fled into another domain, using friends of his father and his lineage linked to Tokugawa Ieyasu. Watanabe eventually located him in the neighborhood of Iga-Ueno. By now, Watanabe Kazuma had been joined in his revenge by Araki Mataemon.

"On the seventh day of the eleventh month of 1634", Watanabe Kazuma, Araki Mataemon, and two other men waited for Kawai Matagoro at the Kagiya crossroads in Iga-Ueno. They had been informed of Matagoro's route. That morning the road was frozen, Mataemon and his followers entered a nearby shop and waited for Matagoro to arrive from Osaka. When the group arrived, Mataemon killed Matagoro's uncle, Kawai Jinzaemon, and the followers who surround Matagoro. Historian Stephen Turnbull wrote, that:

The story was eventually to grow to put the number slain by Mataemon at 36, but this is certainly exaggerated. Mataemon may have been the better swordsman, but he had no intention of killing Matagoro. Kazuma was the one to do that, as the law demanded, so Mataemon pushed Matagoro to Kazuma's side. He himself patiently joined his companions and did not invite them to join in. The Igagoe Vendetta was to be a duel between Kazuma and Matagoro, and nothing must inconvenience it, nor must there be any unnecessary deaths. The duel between Kazuma and Matagoro continued for six hours [...] Both became so weakened in mind and body that they could not even see their opponent. Nevertheless, Mataemon still did not intervene. In a hoarse voice, he encouraged Kazuma, and at one point was able to head off Matagoro from escaping. Discipline was also maintained by Matagoro's men, who had supported him during his exile. It was equally necessary for their side to be seen to be behaving according to the law and the dictates of samurai honor. If Matagoro behaved properly, he might receive a pardon and regain the daimyo authority following a victory. So he made a desperate effort. [...] Then suddenly Kazuma struck home on Matagoro, and just before Matagoro had a chance to respond, Kazuma's sword cut an artery. As Matagoro fell, Kazuma dealt him a final blow to the neck. The law had priority to the bitter end. Mataemon and the others carried out the appropriate procedures afterwards and surrendered themselves to the local daimyo.

Araki Mataemon died by poison in 1638. The culprit was never found.
