= Takenouchi-ryū =

Japanese martial arts school

Takenouchi-ryū (竹内流)
- Ko-ryū

Foundation
- Founder: Takenouchi Chūnagon Daijō Nakatsukasadaiyū Hisamori
- Date founded: 1532
- Period founded: late Muromachi period (1336–1573)

Current information
- Current headmaster: Takenouchi Toichiro Hisamune

Arts taught
- Art: Description
- Jujutsu: Hybrid art, unarmed or with minor weapons
- Bōjutsu: Staff art
- Kenjutsu: Sword art
- Iaijutsu: Sword drawing art
- Naginatajutsu: Glaive art
- Tessenjutsu: Iron fan art
- Hojōjutsu: Rope-tying and restraining art
- Kappō: Resuscitation methods

Ancestor schools
- Tegoi, Sumo

Descendant schools
- Takenouchi Santo-ryū; Bitchū Den Takenouchi-ryū; Takenouchi Hogan-ryū; Araki-ryū; Donteki-ryū; Futagami-ryū; Sōsuishi-ryū; Takagi Yōshin-ryū; Hontai Yōshin-ryū; Motoha Yōshin-ryū; Shingetsu Muso Yanagi-ryū; Kukishin-ryū; Rikishin-ryū; Fusen-ryū; Judo; Jishukan Ryu

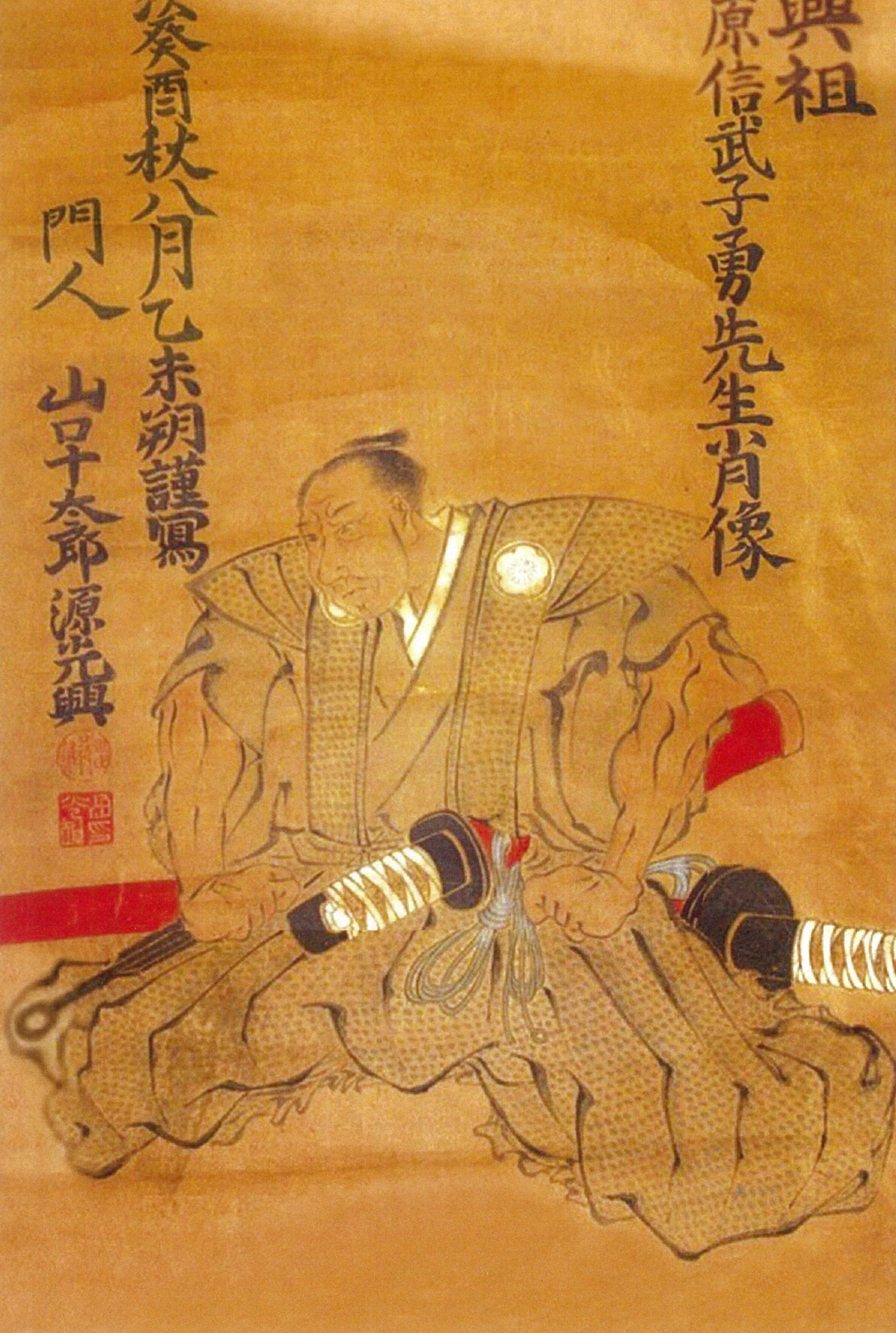
Yoshisato Dontekisai Nobutake (Takenouchi-ryū, Founder of Donteki-ryū)

Hinoshita Torite Kaisan Takenouchi-ryū (日下 捕手 開山 竹内流) is one of the oldest jūjutsu koryū in Japan. It was founded in 1532, the first year of Tenbun, on the twenty-fourth of the sixth lunar month by Takenouchi Chūnagon Daijō Nakatsukasadaiyū Hisamori, the lord of Ichinose Castle in Sakushū. Although it is famous for its jūjutsu, Takenouchi Ryū is actually a complete martial art (sōgō bujutsu), including armored grappling (yoroi kumiuchi), staff (bōjutsu), sword (kenjutsu), sword drawing (iaijutsu), glaive (naginatajutsu), iron fan (tessenjutsu), restraining rope (hojōjutsu), and resuscitation techniques (kappō). Its jūjutsu techniques have been influential in the founding of many other schools in Japan. Takenouchi Ryū is still actively transmitted today by members of the Takenouchi family, as well as by other groups both within and outside Japan.

Together with the Yōshin-ryū and the Ryōi Shintō-ryū, the Takenouchi-ryū was one of the three largest, most important and influential jūjutsu schools of the Edo period before the rise of Judo.

== History ==
According to the Takenouchi Keisho Kogo Den, the document recording the establishment and development of the school, Takenouchi Hisamori retired to the mountains near the Sannomiya shrine to train his martial skills. He practiced there for six days and six nights, wielding a bokken (wooden sword) two shaku and four sun in length (about 2 ft. 4 in. or 72 cm), a relatively long weapon for his purportedly short stature. On the sixth night he fell asleep from exhaustion using his bokken as a pillow. He was woken by a mountain priest with white hair and a long beard who seemed so fearsome to Hisamori that he thought it was an incarnation of the god Atago. Hisamori attacked the stranger, but he was defeated. The priest said to him "When you meet the enemy, in that instant, life and death are decided. That is what is called hyōhō (military strategy)." (凡そ敵に向へば時を移さず、たちどころに殺生降伏させる。これが兵法といふものぞ。) He then took Hisamori's bokken, told him that long weapons were not useful in combat, and broke it into two daggers one shaku and two sun long. The priest told Hisamori to put these in his belt and call them kogusoku, and taught him how to use them in grappling and close combat. These techniques were later called koshi no mawari(腰 の 周り, lit. 'around the waist'). The priest then taught Hisamori how to bind and restrain enemies with rope, using a vine from a tree. Then the priest disappeared mysteriously amidst wind and lightning.

Takenouchi Hisamori's second son Hitachinosuke Hisakatsu became the second head of Takenouchi-ryū after his father formally passed him the tradition at the age of 64. He and his successor and son Kaganosuke Hisayoshi added their own techniques to the curriculum, extending it into a complete sōgō bujutsu system.

== Curriculum ==
Takenouchi-ryū is best known for its jūjutsu, over which it covers an extensive ground. Its unarmed jūjutsu techniques include tehodoki (grip breaking), ukemi (breakfalls), nagewaza (throwing), kansetsuwaza (joint dislocation), atemi (striking weak points), shimewaza (choking), newaza (ground techniques), and kappō (resuscitation). These are combined to form kata for the various sections of jūjutsu taught, including toride (capturing and restraining), hade (attacking vital points unarmed), and kumiuchi (grappling). These unarmed kata are the best known of the Takenouchi-ryū jūjutsu, but they are not truly its foundation. As related in the establishment myth of the school, the central forms of jūjutsu in Takenouchi-ryū are the kogusoku koshi no mawari, techniques of armed grappling using the short sword against armed opponents. It is upon this foundation that the rest of the jūjutsu techniques were developed by Hisakatsu and Hisayoshi, the second and third heads of the school, respectively.

Beyond the core of jūjutsu, many different weapons are taught. These include the sword, the staff, rope tying, the naginata, and more. The sword curriculum is divided into major sections, with kenjutsu covering basic swordsmanship against a similarly armed opponent, saide covering grappling with the sword, and iai covering the techniques of rapid sword drawing and striking. The staff is central to Takenouchi-ryū's study of movement, and as such forms an important part of the curriculum. Staff work addresses various lengths of staff, in particular bōjutsu for the six shaku staff and shinbō for a slightly shorter staff. Other sizes taught include jōjutsu for the common four shaku two sun staff, and hanbōjutsu for shorter sticks around three shaku in length. Rope restraints are an important adjunct to the arresting arts of toride, and the techniques of tying up opponents called hojōjutsu or hobaku are taught using the haya nawa which is a two shaku five sun rope, traditionally of a purple color.

Takenouchi-ryū is perhaps lesser known for its other weapons techniques, but as a true sōgō bujutsu it retains a number of weapons for use both on and off the battlefield. The naginata and kusarigama are covered, as well as the jutte truncheon, shuriken throwing darts, and the tessen iron fan. Some kata feature rather peculiar weapons intended to show the use of everyday objects for defense against sword attacks. These include the kasa, a Japanese style umbrella, and the nabebuta, a wooden lid for a cooking pot.

== Influence ==
Takenouchi-ryū has exerted a strong influence in the development of jūjutsu. The branches of the Takenouchi-ryū have influenced many schools directly or indirectly and thus many techniques found in modern jūdō and aikidō can be traced back to their roots in Takenouchi-ryū in one way or another. A number of important jūjutsu koryū were founded by students of the school, such as the Rikishin-ryū, Fusen-ryū, Sōsuishi-ryū, Takagi Yōshin-ryū and its branches (such as Hontai Yōshin Ryū), and Araki-ryū. These ryūha have incorporated many techniques from Takenouchi-ryū either directly from the school or by analyzing the techniques of its exponents.

Takenouchi-ryū has documents by its founder on the use and teaching of rokushakubōjutsu [6-foot-long (1.8 m) stick]. This makes it the oldest verifiable school to teach these skills and it is believed to have had a great influence on other arts teaching rokushakubōjutsu.

== Lineage ==
As with any koryū, the lineage of Takenouchi-ryū is a matter of importance and pride to its members. Since the tradition was maintained in the Takenouchi family a careful account of the successive heads of the school has been kept over the centuries.

Family of Takenouchi-ryū

1. Takenouchi Nakatsukasadayū Hisamori
2. Takenouchi Hitachinosuke Hisakatsu
3. Takenouchi Kaganosuke Hisayoshi
4. Takenouchi Tōichirō Hisatsugu
5. Takenouchi Tōichirō Hisamasa
6. Takenouchi Tōichirō Hisashige	Takenouchi Tōkurō Hisazō
7. Takenouchi Tōichirō Hisataka	Takenouchi Tōhatsusai Hisanobu
8. Takenouchi Tōichirō Hisayoshi	Takenouchi Tōhachirō Hisanao
9. Takenouchi Gamonta Hisayori	9. Takenouchi Tōjūrō Hisatane	Yoshisato Dontekisai Nobutake
10. Takenouchi Tōichirō Hisao	10. Takenouchi Tōjūrō Hisamori	Mabuchi Kahei Masayasu
11. Takenouchi Tōichirō Hisanori	11. Takenouchi Tōjūrō Hisamitsu	Motoyama Danzo Shigetaka
12. Takenouchi Tōichirō Hisatsugu	12. Takenouchi Tōjūrō Hisahiro	Itagaki Taisuke Masakata
13. Takenouchi Tōichirō Hisanori	13. Takenouchi Tōjūrō Hisatake
14. Takenouchi Tōichirō Hisamune

After the 8th headmaster, Takenouchi Tōichirō Hisayoshi, the lineage was split into two branches called the sōke and sōdenke lines. This was done to ensure that the blood line and tradition would be preserved.

=== Bitchū-den ===
Besides the two divisions of the school given above, there are multiple groups claiming lineage to Takenouchi-ryū. Among them, one group is called the Bitchū-den Takenouchi-ryū (竹内流 備中伝). The group claims that they directly originate from Bitchū Takenouchi-ryū, a branch of Takenouchi-ryū that spread at the early 17th century.

The BitchūTakenouchi-ryū lineage was developed through Takeuchi Seidaiyū Masatsugu, a disciple of the third headmaster of the family line of Takenouchi-ryū, who moved to Okayama, the capital of Bitchū Province (now western Okayama Prefecture).

Bitchū Den lineage:

4. Takeuchi Seidaiyū Masatsugu.
5. Yamamoto Kazuemon Hisayoshi.
6. Shimizu Kichiuemon Kiyonobu.
...
14. Takeuchi Tsunaichi Masatori. Head of Nisshinkan dōjō.
15. Nakayama Kazuo Torimasa. Current head of Nisshinkan dōjō, second head of Okayama Daigaku College Kobudō Section.
16. Ono Yotaro Masahito. Head of Chofukan Dojo and Doshisha Daigaku College Kobudo Section.
17. Takagi Shigeaki Hitotsugu. Head of Chofukan Dojo and Shinpukan Dojo.

The Bichū Den lineage has its own curriculum with variations and the addition of techniques in certain areas.

=== Donteki-ryū ===
Takenouchi Nakatsukasa-dayū Hisamori	Takenouchi Hitachinosuke Hisakatsu	Takenouchi Kaganosuke Hisayoshi
Takenouchi Tōichirō Hisatsugu	Takenouchi Tōichirō Hisamasa	Takenouchi Tōichirō Hisashige
Namba Ipposai Hisanaga	Takenouchi Tōkurō Hisazō
Takenouchi Tōhatsusai Hisanobu	Takenouchi Tōhachirō Hisanao	Yoshisato Dontekisai Nobutake
Yamaguchi Jūtarō; Mitsuoki
Tsuji Kandayū Nochiharu	Tokunaga Den'nosuke
Mabuchi Kahei Masayasu	Motoyama Danzō Shigetaka	Motoyama Isaburō Shigeyuki	Inui (Itagaki) Seishi
Itagaki Taisuke Masakata
Kataoka Kenkichi Masumitsu
Yokota Gensaku	Yamawaki Santarō	Nagano Ryōkichi
Sakurai Jingoemon Naokata	Shimada Hayatonosuke Yonaoshi	Nakayama Junsuke Masayoshi	Itō Yūjirō Suketō	Hiraki Sōsai
Ishihara Shōbei Takemasa	Watanabe Kōshirō	Mitsumatsu Kanbei Katsumitsu	Masaki Shōgorō
Masuda Chūji	Akagi Rokudayū Nagasada	Shirakami Isuke Masanori

(Reference) "Yoshisato dontekisai nobutake monka Takenouchi-ryū Kumiuchi-jutsu Sōdenkeifu" by Itagaki Taisuke Honoring Association

Gifu incident of Itagaki Taisuke (Menkyo-kaiden "免許皆伝")

=== Takeuchi Santo-ryū ===
The Takeuchi Santo-ryū or Takenouchi Santo-ryū (竹内三統流) was founded in the Higo Domain by mixing three Takenouchi lineages influenced by Araki-ryū. This school is extinct, but the writings of its last master Hideki Shimada are studied by the Bitchū-den.

== International branches of Takenouchi-ryū Bitchū-den ==
Two varieties of training groups are authorized: dōjō and study circles. Authorized dōjō are usually headed by someone ranked Daigeiko or higher, have full teaching authority and limited authority to award rank. Study circles train with the permission of the head of Chofukan and Shinpukan, have limited teaching authority and no authority to award rank. As of October 2026 there are four international dōjō and several study circles.

Dojo

- Shofukan (松風館), run by Anna Seabourne, located in West Yorkshire in the United Kingdom.
- Gyofukan (暁風館), run by Anthony Abry, located in Valencia, Spain.
- Seifukan (正風館), run by Wayne Muromoto, located in Hawaii.
- Shofukan (翔風館), run by Alex Kask, located in Vancouver, British Columbia, Canada.

Study circles

- Ryufukai (龍風会), run by Andrew Antis, located in Michigan.
- Mushinkai (無心会), run by Marek Motycka and Hynek Perina, located in Prague, Czech Republic.
- Zuifukai (瑞風会), run by Kazuki Kawakami and Greg Davis, located in Melbourne, Australia.
