= Submission wrestling =

Fighting style

Submission grappling
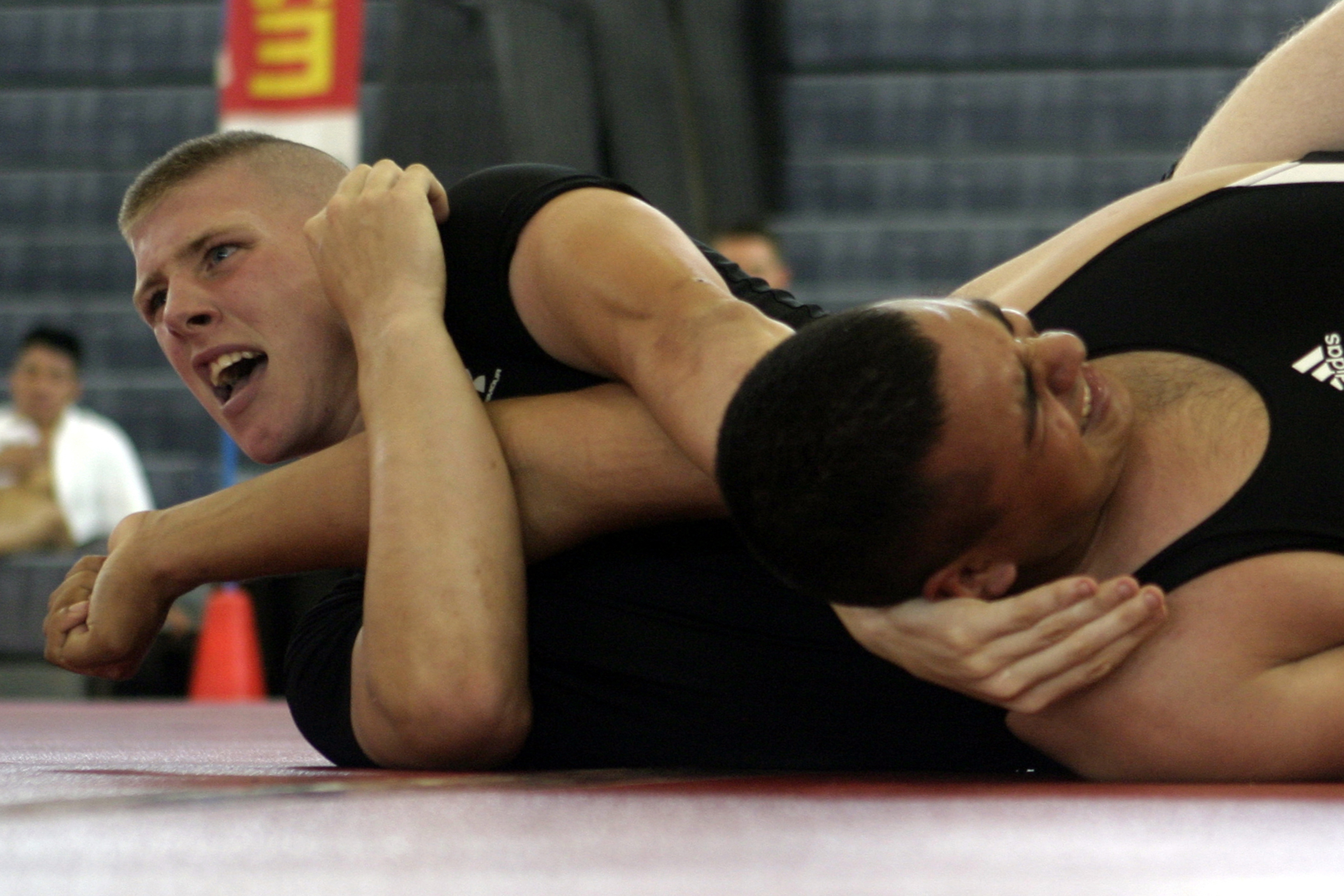
- Also known as: Submission wrestling Submission fighting Grappling; No-gi jiu-jitsu
- Focus: Grappling arts, wrestling, submissions
- Hardness: Full-contact
- Parenthood: Brazilian jiu-jitsu; Catch wrestling; Judo; Sambo; Various other grappling and wrestling styles

Submission wrestling, also known as submission fighting and submission grappling or simply grappling, is a combat sport that focuses on ground fighting and submission techniques. It is a hybrid discipline that incorporates elements of various martial arts such as various wrestling styles, judo, and Brazilian jiu-jitsu. Submission wrestling is practiced both as a competitive sport and as a training method for self-defence and mixed martial arts (MMA).

Submission wrestling is a grappling-based combat sport that focuses on controlling an opponent through techniques such as joint locks, chokeholds, and positional dominance. Competitors may win matches by forcing an opponent to submit, usually by “tapping out,” or by earning points through takedowns, reversals, guard passes, and dominant positions depending on the ruleset used. The sport combines techniques from several martial arts and combat systems, including catch wrestling, freestyle and Greco-Roman wrestling, judo, sambo, Brazilian jiu-jitsu, and various other wrestling styles. Training commonly includes drilling techniques, live sparring (often called “rolling”), and conditioning exercises designed to improve technical ability, endurance, flexibility, and overall physical fitness.

Safety is considered an important aspect of submission wrestling, as athletes are taught to recognize dangerous positions and submit before serious injury occurs. Referees may also stop a match if a competitor is unable to defend themselves or is in immediate danger. Unlike some martial arts, submission wrestling does not follow a universal ranking structure. Certain disciplines, such as Brazilian jiu-jitsu, use colored belt systems to indicate experience and progression, while other styles, such as catch wrestling, place greater emphasis on competition performance and practical skill development rather than formal ranks.

Submission wrestling has gained international popularity due to its effectiveness in mixed martial arts (MMA), where grappling ability is considered a major component of fighting strategy. Organizations such as the Ultimate Fighting Championship (UFC) have helped increase public awareness of grappling-focused combat sports, as many successful fighters rely heavily on submission techniques and ground control. According to the International Brazilian Jiu-Jitsu Federation (IBJJF), grappling arts emphasize “technique and leverage over strength,” allowing smaller competitors to defend themselves against larger opponents. Many practitioners also train in submission wrestling for self-defense, physical fitness, and competitive achievement.

== Background ==
In Ancient Greece, pankration emerged as a popular combat sport around the 7th century BCE. Pankration combined striking and grappling techniques, including joint locks and chokes, and was even included in the Ancient Olympic Games. In Japan, jujutsu became prominent in the 17th century. Jujutsu focused on using an opponent's energy against them and included techniques like joint locks, throws, and pins.

Jigoro Kano later developed Judo in the late 19th century, incorporating many grappling techniques from jujutsu, Judo influenced the development of various grappling styles around the world in particular Brazilian jiu-jitsu. Other styles of submission grappling also emerged, such as freestyle wrestling and sambo in the Soviet Union, which blended elements of Judo and traditional wrestling. All of these grappling arts contributed to the development of submission wrestling.

== Generic term ==
Some mixed martial arts schools and fighters may use the term submission wrestling to refer to their grappling methods while avoiding association with any one particular martial art. The label is sometimes also used to describe the tactic in mixed martial arts competition of relying primarily upon submission wrestling skills to defeat an opponent.

The term "no-gi" usually refers to a form of competition and training that does not use the gi, the "combat kimono" worn in traditional martial arts. "No-gi Brazilian jiu-jitsu" is often used as a synonym of submission wrestling in some circles, thanks to this art being a primarily ground fighting and submission seeking fighting style.

== Objective ==
In submission wrestling, the primary objective is to force an opponent to submit through the application of joint locks, chokes, or other submission holds. Unlike freestyle and Greco-Roman wrestling, which often involve pinning an opponent's shoulders to the ground for victory, submission wrestling emphasises techniques that can lead to a submission such as tapping out or verbally submitting.

Submission wrestling competitions, often referred to as no-gi, grappling tournaments or submission-only events, can vary in rulesets. Some competitions allow competitors to use strikes, while others focus solely on grappling techniques. Points may be awarded for takedowns, dominant positions, and near-submissions. However, the ultimate goal is to secure a submission, which ends the match.

== Styles ==
- 10th Planet Jiu-Jitsu: An American hybrid of no-gi Brazilian jiu-jitsu founded by Eddie Bravo, influences from American folkstyle wrestling and Jean Jacques Machado's style of BJJ. More focus on no-gi half-guard and guard techniques that may be considered unorthodox in BJJ.
- Aikido: A Japanese martial art drawing influences primarily from a Japanese Jujutsu style, Daitō-ryū Aiki-jūjutsu. Just as Japanese Jujutsu, this art has heavy emphasis on throws, joint locks, and chokes.
- Brazilian jiu-jitsu: A popular Brazilian grappling martial art with an emphasis on ground fighting and submission holds. It involves training with and without a gi. It was developed from a combination of Judo, Japanese Jujutsu, and wrestling techniques. Brazilian jiu-jitsu "no-gi" is the primary martial art from which the modern submission wrestling practice is derived.
- Catch wrestling: Also called "catch-as-catch-can", the style of grappling (without the gi) originated in Lancashire, Northern England and later became the dominant wrestling style in America during the 19th century, and has experienced a resurgence during recent years due to MMA popularity. Early professional wrestling was once competitive catch wrestling before the sport slowly transitioned to sportive entertainment during the mid-1920s, with amateur catch wrestling becoming Olympic freestyle and collegiate wrestling.
- Danzan-ryū Jujitsu: A Hawaiian/American style of jujutsu founded by a Japanese-American martial artist, Seishiro Okazaki. It combines the elements of Japanese Jujutsu styles (Yōshin-ryū, Namba Shoshin-ryū, Iwaga-ryū, Kosogabe-ryū), Judo, Kapu Kuialua, Shōrin-ryū Karate, Chin Na, Boxing, Arnis, Folk Wrestling, etc. While most of Danzan-ryū's organizations teach in traditional manner, one of its organizations, Jujitsu America, provides an amateur-level sport fighting format for its practitioners and martial artists from other fighting styles.
- Hapkido: A Korean martial art influenced by Daitō-ryū Aiki-jūjutsu, Judo, and other Korean martial arts. Hapkido, along with Judo, later influenced other distinct martial arts, Gongkwon Yusul and Yongmudo.
- Hokutoryu Ju-Jutsu: A modern style of Finnish Jujutsu and a combat sport founded by Auvo Niiniketo, who has background in English Jujitsu style (WJJF), Karate, Kickboxing, etc.
- German Jujutsu: A modern German martial art and a combat sport (under Ju-Jitsu International Federation's rules) founded in 1960s, drawing influence from Judo, Karate, Japanese Jujutsu, and Aikido. Influences of other arts were added further in 2000.
- Gongkwon Yusul: A modern martial art originally created with influences from Judo, Hapkido, Jujutsu (Hakkō-ryū), Kyuktoogi (Korean-style kickboxing), and other Korean martial arts. It exists as an amateur-level combat sport.
- Judo: A Japanese martial art focusing on high-impact throws, pins, joint locks, and chokes. It is also an Olympic sport, practiced wearing the judogi, but has been adapted to submission wrestling purposes.
- Japanese ju-jutsu or jujutsu: An ancient art of Japanese wrestling/grappling that places a heavy emphasis on joint locks, chokes, and throws. Uses a gi traditionally.
- Kyukgido: A modern martial art and a combat sport created by a South Korean professional wrestler, Lee Wang Pyo. Lee was not only a student of Kim Il (a student of the famous wrestler, Rikidōzan). While the main influences in this style came from Professional wrestling (Puroresu), the founder also studied Amateur wrestling, Judo, Boxing, and Taekwondo.
- Luta livre (pt): A Brazilian form of submission wrestling adapted from catch wrestling, trained without a gi. Similarly to Sambo, they may or may not include striking depending on their substyle.
- Malla-yuddha: One of the oldest practiced forms of submission/combat wrestling, originating in pre-partition India, malla-yuddha is divided into four parent techniques, each named after particular Hindu gods and legendary fighters: Hanumanti concentrates on technical and positional superiority, Jambuvanti uses locks and holds to force the opponent into submission, Jarasandhi concentrates on breaking the limbs and joints and applying tracheal chokes while Bhimaseni focuses on sheer strength.
- Pehlwani: The premier wrestling style of South Asia. It is descended from Malla-yuddha and the Persian varzesh-e bastani.
- Pankration: Originating from ancient Greece, it combines elements that today are found mainly in the punches of boxing (pygmachia) and in the kicking of many martial arts (laktisma) with moves from the also Greece-originating wrestling (pale) and joint locks, thus creating a broad fighting sport similar to today's mixed martial arts.
- Sambo: A Soviet (Russian) style of grappling that typically uses a jacket, but without gi pants. Sambo uses leglocks, but most styles do not permit chokes. Similarly to Pankration, Combat Sambo, one of the substyles, also permits strikes.
- Shoot wrestling: A Japanese martial art (without the gi) based on catch wrestling, freestyle wrestling, and Greco-Roman wrestling, which later incorporated judo, sambo, karate, and Muay Thai. The major sub-disciplines of shoot wrestling are Shooto and shootfighting, along with Combat Wrestling.
  - Combat wrestling (ja): A style of shoot wrestling founded by elite wrestler and MMA coach Noriaki Kiguchi (ja).
  - Shooto: A Japanese martial art consisting of catch wrestling, judo, jujutsu, sambo, and kickboxing developed by professional wrestler Satoru Sayama.
  - Shootfighting: Japanese martial arts consisting of striking arts like Muay Thai along with catch wrestling. In Japan, it is a broad term that includes different styles, such as Pancrase, but in United States, it refers to a combat sport with the name, Shootfighting, a sport founded by an American martial artist, Bart Vale.
- Shuai jiao: A Chinese style of wrestling that incorporates throws and chin na (joint locks).
- Sport jujitsu: Different styles of jujitsu originating in Western countries that combines grappling styles like Judo, Aikido and Japanese Jujutsu with striking styles, such as Karate, Kickboxing, etc., forming hybrid martial arts in different modern sport formats. Sport jujitsu styles have different governing bodies, and the most prominent one is Ju-Jitsu International Federation (JJIF).
- Submission Arts Wrestling (SAW): A Japanese style of catch wrestling founded in 1980's by Shihan Hidetaka Aso, who was a champion of wrestling and Sambo in Japan. Aso also trained in various other arts such as Judo, Sumo, Sambo, Wrestling, Karate, Muay Thai, Catch wrestling, and Shoot wrestling to create his own hybrid martial art practiced without gi.
- Yongmudo: A modern Korean martial art and a combat sport created in Yong In University by combining Judo, Taekwondo, Hapkido, Ssirum, Kumdo, Boxing, and Wrestling.

== Hybrid styles ==
=== Combat Jiu-Jitsu ===
Combat Jiu-Jitsu
- Focus: Brazilian jiu-jitsu no-gi hybrid
- Hardness: Full-contact
- Country of origin: United States
- Creator: Eddie Bravo
- Famous practitioners: Vagner Rocha, Craig Jones, Masakazu Imanari, Brianna Ste-Marie, Tyson Griffin, Wilson Reis
- Parenthood: Brazilian jiu-jitsu, MMA
- Olympic sport: No

Combat Jiu-Jitsu (CJJ) is a submission grappling style innovated by American BJJ black belt Eddie Bravo in 2013. Following the success of his Eddie Bravo Invitational (EBI) events, Bravo decided to create a martial art aimed at self-defense that could also be used in competition. Inspired from Pancrase matches as well as from the original Gracie Challenge. Combat Jiu-Jitsu gained wider exposure after partnering with UFC Fight Pass through Eddie Bravo Invitational events.The ruleset differs from traditional Brazilian jiu-jitsu competition by allowing open-handed strikes on the ground while prohibiting closed-fist punches and standing strikes. Eddie Bravo later expanded the format through Combat Jiu-Jitsu World Championships and the female-only Medusa tournaments. CJJ incorporates No-Gi BJJ techniques while adding open palm strikes allowing competitors to strike each other on the ground to open up the defense, CJJ matches are won by submission within the regulation period, or a winner is determined by EBI overtime rules.

First run as competitive matches during his invitational events, starting with EBI 11 in 2017, the first Combat Jiu-Jitsu World event took place in 2018. Since then, multiple world champions have been crowned and the first team world championship took place at the end of 2022.

=== Combat Submission Wrestling ===
Combat Submission Wrestling
- Focus: Hybrid
- Hardness: Full-contact
- Country of origin: United States
- Creator: Erik Paulson
- Famous practitioners: Brock Lesnar, Sean Sherk, Josh Barnett, Renato Sobral, James Wilks, Cub Swanson
- Parenthood: Shooto, catch wrestling, boxing, kickboxing, Muay Thai, Brazilian jiu-jitsu, Jeet Kun Do
- Olympic sport: No

Combat Submission Wrestling (CSW) is a modern form of submission wrestling (and MMA system) developed by Erik Paulson, former Shooto light heavyweight champion. It includes grappling, submissions, and striking. It is a style that borrows elements and techniques from grappling styles including catch wrestling, Shooto, judo, and Brazilian jiu-jitsu along with striking styles such as boxing, kickboxing, and Muay Thai. CSW was designed as a complete mixed martial arts system integrating striking, clinching, takedowns, and submission grappling. Paulson developed the system after training extensively in Shooto, catch wrestling, Brazilian jiu-jitsu, judo, Muay Thai, and Jeet Kune Do concepts. The system has been used to train numerous MMA athletes, including former UFC and PRIDE competitors such as Josh Barnett, Sean Sherk, and Brock Lesnar. Erik Paulson is recognized as the first American to win a Shooto world championship in Japan.

=== Hayastan Wrestling ===
Hayastan Grappling System or Hayastan Freestyle Wrestling
- Focus: Grappling hybrid
- Hardness: Full-contact
- Country of origin: Armenia
- Creator: Gokor Chivichyan, Gene LeBell
- Famous practitioners: Karo Parysian, Bryan Danielson, Sydney Sweeney, Ronda Rousey, Manny Gamburyan, Tony Halme, Karen Darabedyan
- Parenthood: Greco-Roman wrestling, Freestyle wrestling, Catch wrestling, Brazilian jiu-jitsu, Judo, Sambo
- Olympic sport: No

Hayastan Grappling System or Hayastan Freestyle Wrestling, is a submission grappling style developed by multiple grappling black belts Gokor Chivichyan and Gene LeBell that blends elements of judo, sambo, catch wrestling, Brazilian jiu-jitsu, Greco-Roman and freestyle wrestling. This system includes all forms of submissions, including leg locks, footlocks, kneebars, heel hooks, shoulder locks, wrist locks, neck cranks, body cranks, chokes and others.

=== American Jiu-Jitsu ===
American Jiu-Jitsu
- Focus: Grappling hybrid
- Hardness: Full-contact
- Country of origin: United States
- Creator: Jake Shields, Keenan Cornelius
- Famous practitioners: Derek Moneyberg
- Parenthood: Scholastic wrestling, Collegiate wrestling, Brazilian jiu-jitsu
- Olympic sport: No

American Jiu-Jitsu is a combination of wrestling and Brazilian jiu-jitsu developed in the US. The first person who was associated with this term was MMA fighter Jake Shields, who stated that it was an "Americanized" form of BJJ. In 2019, Keenan Cornelius, a BJJ black belt from San Diego, founded his personal academy that he named Legion American Jiu-Jitsu (AJJ). After that, he started to explain the style to the media, which caused a backlash from the Brazilian community, although Cornelius continued promoting his academy.

== Grappling tournaments and organizations ==
- ADCC Submission Fighting World Championship
- International Brazilian Jiu-Jitsu Federation
  - World IBJJF Jiu-Jitsu No-Gi Championship
  - European IBJJF Jiu-Jitsu No-Gi Championship
  - Pan IBJJF Jiu-Jitsu No-Gi Championship
  - Brazilian Nationals Jiu-Jitsu No-Gi Championship
- Polaris Pro Grappling
- United World Wrestling
- Grapplers Quest
- ONE Championship

== See also ==
- FILA grappling
- Styles of wrestling
