= Kukishin-ryū =

Japanese martial art

Kukishin-ryū (九鬼神流)
- Ko-ryū
- The original Kanji for the name. Notice that the Chinese character 鬼 (oni-demon) replaces the older kokuji character. The "hornless" version is used in modern texts due to Japanese writing simplification, unintentionally altering the meaning.

Foundation
- Founder: Ryūshin Yakushimaru Kuki
- Date founded: c.14th century
- Period founded: Nanboku-chō period

Current information
- Current headmaster: Various

Arts taught
- Art: Description
- Taijutsu: Grappling (unarmed or with minor weapons)
- Bōjutsu: Staff art
- Naginatajutsu: Glaive art
- Kempō: Sword art
- Hanbōjutsu: Three foot staff art
- Sōjutsu: Spear art
- Heihō (兵法): Military strategy

Ancestor schools
- Shinden Fujiwara Musō-ryū, Takenouchi-ryū

Descendant schools
- Hontai Yōshin-ryū, Takagi Yōshin-ryū, Aikido; other modern schools

Kukishin-ryū (九鬼神流), originally "Nine Gods Divine (from heaven) School" (also translated as "Nine Demon Divine (from heaven) School" by many modern groups having different lineages) is a Japanese martial art allegedly founded in the 14th century CE by Kuki Yakushimaru Ryūshin (Yakushimaru Kurando). It is a sōgō bujutsu, meaning that it teaches several different weapons/arts such as taijutsu, bōjutsu, naginatajutsu, kenpō, hanbōjutsu, sōjutsu and heiho. Kukishin-ryū and its founder are listed in the Bugei Ryūha Daijiten or "The Encyclopedia of Martial Art Schools", a record of modern (gendai) and old lineage (koryū) Japanese martial schools.

== The Legend of Kukishin-ryū ==
Ryushin Yakushimaru, the founder of Kukishin-ryū, was born to Dōyu Shirōhōgan at Kumano-Hongu in Wakayama prefecture on January 1, 1318. He was born into one of the most influential clans in Kumano, who were the descendants of the Fujiwara clan who served for generations as bettō, or “Shrine Supervisors." The family eventually entered into the Taira-Minamoto War and commanded the Kumano Navy. Ryushin's mother was Chigusa-hime, whose brother was Suketomo Dainagon Hino, a member of the Southern Imperial court. Because Chigusa-hime had difficulty in conceiving she made a pilgrimage to Enryaku-ji temple at Mt. Hiei where she prayed to the Yakushi Buddha (Bhaisajyaguru-Vaiduryaprabha) for help. Soon after, she became pregnant and gave birth to a baby boy, which she named Yakushimaru after the deity.

Ryushin learned the martial arts and military sciences (Shinden Fujiwara Musō-ryū) handed down in his family from his grandfather Dōjitsu and Shingu-Bettō Ariie. After learning shugendō (mountaineering asceticism) from his father Dōyu, Ryushin then went to Kyoto where he learned esoteric Buddhism from the Buddhist monk Jōkai at Sanmaku-in temple. He also trained in martial arts at Mt. Kurama and was said to be master of Kuji-hihō and Onmyo-do.

In 1335, when Ryushin celebrated his coming of age, he joined the Northern Court under Takauji Ashikaga in a war against the Southern Court. In June, 1336 Ryushin and his vanguard led an attack on the Southern Court's fort on Mt. Hiei. The fort eventually fell and the Southern Court Emperor, Go-Daigo, and his loyal vassals were captured and kept at the old palace of former Emperor Kazanin. Takauji's treatment of the prisoners was so abhorrent that Ryushin was quoted as saying "It is possible to loose the emperor from the harsh treatment he receives. I will plot his rescue." With other conspirators Ooe Gyōbu Daiyu Kageshige, Bessho Saburō Takanori (Kojima Takanori), Hiyoshi Iga Nyudō and Kisshuin Sōshin Hōgen, Ryushin broke into the palace of Kazanin and escaped to Yoshino with Emperor Go-daigo.

Tadayoshi Kuragari-Tōge, the younger brother of Takauji, was alerted of the escape and sent an army of about ten thousand men in pursuit. The army caught up with Ryushin and the conspirators at Kuragari-Tōge, a mountain pass situated on the borders of Osaka and Nara prefectures. It was here that they made a stand against the army, each choosing a weapon they were proficient with. Kageshige took a sword, Takatoku a bow and arrow, and Ryushin a halberd (naginata). As the army outnumbered them completely, it was a battle of strategy and evasion; eventually the blade of Ryushin's Naginata was cut off. So Ryushin used the remains of his naginata to knock down enemies near him and put enemies at bay by swinging the staff in the air, drawing out the kuji-kiri as he did. It is said that the Bōjutsu in Kukishin Ryū was later devised on the techniques Ryushin used on this occasion.

Reinforcements from Yoshino eventually arrived and they could safely take the Emperor Godaigo to a small temple-like hut located at Mt. Kinpusen. Ryushin also succeeded in re-capturing the “Three Treasures of the Imperial House” which he had concealed in a scripture-warehouse at Yokawa in Mt. Hiei. The Emperor Go-Daigo praised Ryushin's dedication and inquired about his secret techniques. Ryushin answered, "It is a secret technique passed on in my family. It is The secret art of Kuji." The emperor then made an announcement as follows: "God knows your loyalty. You shall change your surname Fujiwara to Kuki." The "Ku" of Kuki stands for "Ku" or “nine” in Japanese. "Ki" can be pronounced "Kami" if the character is pronounced in the Japanese way, meaning "Oni-gami"(holy spirit) as opposed to "Oni" (evil spirits). "Ku-ki" is therefore actually "Ku-kami." However, it has been customarily pronounced Kuki since the Edo period.

After the war Ryushin's mother Chigusa Hino, whose family belonged to the Southern Court, lamented over the fact that Ryushin took the side of the Northern Court. She traveled to Musashi (modern day Hino city in Tokyo,) where the Hino family still lived and she died despondently. After his mother's death, Ryushin created the Kukishin Bojutsu in honor of his mother which he called "Juji-Roppou-Kujidome" devoted and himself to protecting the Emperor Go-Daigo

The records of the Kuki family are kept in scrolls and transcriptions which have been rarely shown, but which have been seen and accounted for by scholars. These ancient documents came to be known to the public when Miura Ichiro published A Study of the Kuki Archives in 1941. The scrolls are known for containing supplementary records concerning the mythological age, complementing the Kojiki and the Nihon Shoki, the two major ancient documents in Japan. Volumes on Ko-shinto, martial arts and Kumano Honzan Shugendō were accounted. Until Miura's publication, the only mention of the scrolls was in volume two of Sontoku Okina Yawa that detailed Kuki Takahiro, the 24th head of the Kukis, giving "ten volumes of books concerning Shintoism" to the scholar Ninomiya Sontoku. After Miura's publication came Kuki-shinden-zensho by Ago Kiyotaka, a leading figure in the study of ancient history, detailing some of the contents of the scrolls, including the origins and history of Kukishin-ryū.

== About the Name ==

- 九 "Ku" stands for “nine" in Japanese.
- 鬼 "Ki" as seen on the far left is actually an incorrect kanji for the name. It is supposed to be an older Chinese based kanji meaning "Kami" or god but it is now long obsolete (compare above). This is because over the years the older character became lost due to the need to simplify/unify the Chinese characters used in Japanese writing. So, the similar, original character of 鬼 (oni or demon) is used in its stead. This inadvertently changes the meaning of the name to modern readers, who rightly believe that it reads "Nine Demons;" yet in fact the character was originally pronounced as "Oni-gami"(holy spirit) as opposed to "Oni" (evil spirits). The name "Ku-ki" is therefore actually "Ku-kami" yet, it has been customarily pronounced as "Kuki" since the Edo period.
- 神 "Shin" or "kami" means god or spirit- the English interpretation of "spirit" works better as "Nine Gods God School" sounds redundant and creates problems in comprehension.
- 流 "Ryū" translates originally as "flow," however when related with the transmission of traditions as martial arts and appended to the name of a style or system, it means "school."

== Techniques ==
The teachings of the Ryū are detailed in the Kukishin Densho (scrolls).

Kukishin Ryu transmits its traditions and knowledge in six main martial disciplines: Taijutsu, Bōjutsu, Kenpō, Naginatajutsu, Hanbōjutsu and Sōjutsu. Heiho (military strategy), complements this training. Besides these major disciplines, practitioners may also learn secret weapons, hidden teachings and Onakatomi shinto (Ko-shinto) practices.

=== Taijutsu (体術) ===
This art (jutsu) consists of locks, entanglements, strangling, striking and kicking, as well as the use of small weapons such as shuriken. The Taijutsu techniques of Kukishin-ryū were altered by the seventh head of the school Kiyotaka Kuki, and organized by his son Sumitaka. This was because the techniques of Atekomi (striking) originated at times when armor was worn and became outdated. These techniques were modified to fit in with the early edo jidai. In the late Edo era, the twenty-fifth Soke, Takatomo Kuki, devised the Kihongata that consisted of eight techniques used for teaching the basics of the Ryu arts to beginners- however, this review did little to quell its brutality in learning and teaching. In an effort to make safer to learn and teach, Takatomo altered the techniques so that beginners could practice without suffering injuries. Takatomo served at Nijō Castle in Kyoto, where on February 28, 1864 he visited the Imperial Court and demonstrated his new methods to the emperor.

Kukishin-ryū and Takagi-Yōshin-ryū Taijutsu

There is a strong relationship between the taijutsu of Kukishin-ryū and Takagi-Yoshin-ryū. According to Takamatsu Chōsui, the story of blending of Takagi-ryū Taijutsu into Kukishin-ryū (and Kukishin-ryū bōjutsu into Takagi-ryū) is as follows:

The untimely death of inheritor Sadataka Kuki left Kukishin-ryū without an heir. Therefore, the eldest son of Yoshitaka Kuki, named Kihei, became the successor. During the time of his inheritance, Kihei's health was very poor and he was bedridden. Eventually he grew stronger and was able to head the ryū properly, even becoming a mountaineering ascetic and traveling far across Japan. During one of his journeys Kihei happened to meet the son of Gennoshin Takagi in Akou (present day Hyōgo Prefecture), who was named Umanosuke. During their visit together, they compared the acumen of their two ryu. Whereas Takagi exceeded in Taijutsu, Kihei's Bōjutsu was superior. So in agreement, they altered the basic format of the two ryū. Since this time the basic Taijutsu of Kukishin-ryū is Takagi-ryū while the Bōjutsu, Spear and Naginata techniques have remained Kukishin-ryū. r

=== Bōjutsu (棒術) ===
The bōjutsu of Kukishin Ryū is best described as a method used to defeat/trick wielders of other weapons. It has special striking techniques that allow the Bō to feign quickly and re-direct its aim; a special method of "twirling" (Bofurigata) designed to confuse opponents and keep them at bay; and thrusting techniques that correlate with throwing the staff as a projectile (nagebō). Aspects of the Bōjutsu are gleaned from two other weapons within the school: naginata and the spear.

Bōjutsu, Sensudori and the Kaiden-Gata

There are actually three sizes of bō that could be categorized as bōjutsu within Kukishin Ryū: Rokushaku-bō (long), Han-bō (medium) and the Tan-bō (small). However, what is called 'Bōjutsu' in Kukishin Ryū involves the use of the Rokushaku-bō; nevertheless, this is really only the start of the Bōjutsu practice. The Han-bō is traditionally taught independently of the other techniques, which are formally contained in what is called 'Sensudori,' the upper echelon of the schools teachings (Kaiden-gata). Additionally the Han-bō is categorized into 'Tessenjutsu' and taught as part of the Taijutsu as a close-quarters weapon. In Sensudori, the basic Kukishin Ryū strategy of "Gō, Ri, Hō, Chi, Shin" is exemplified. The beginner will use a staff of 180 cm, then 90 cm and finally one of 26 cm. This is concurrent with the ideology of Gō, Ri, Hō, Chi, Shin in application.

=== Kenpō (剣法) ===
The kanji for this means "sword law" (not "fist law"). It consists of evasion, slashing, stabbing, blocking and countering. It also includes the use of bōshuriken. One of the signature movements of Kukishin Ryū Kempō is the upward slashing. The ninth head of the family, Yoshitaka Kuki, participated in the war against Korea under Hideyoshi Toyotomi. In the marine battle off the shore of Ulusan, the belly-shot Yoshitaka jumped aboard the enemy's ship and slashed upward into the crotch of the admiral with his sword. After this, the technique became well-renowned. The Kenpō also includes the use of 'Token-jutsu', or the method of throwing blades and swords (shurikenjutsu). While it teaches the use of bōshuriken, it is also considered an alternative method of using a dagger and long sword.

=== Naginatajutsu (薙刀術) ===
The Kukishin Ryū Naginata is 225 cm in overall length. It has a double edged blade that is 21 cm long and is attached to the shaft by wires. It is used to slash, parry, strike, stab and deflect; the blade is also used to hook and arrest. Naginata is a weapon of primary importance in Kukishin Ryū as the Bōjutsu owes its origin to the Naginata. It stands as another signature weapon of Kukishin Ryū and it is perhaps the base of the ryu's creation.

=== Hanbōjutsu (半棒術) ===
The hanbō of Kukishin-ryū is used to parry, strike, crush and stab. It integrates with taijutsu as well. The hanbō is most directly related to the spear and staff, however these influences are superficial. It is safe to say that although the spear was in fact the origin of the hanbō itself, it truly plied its techniques from the sword.

Ukon Kuriyama is thought to have created and introduced the hanbō techniques to Kukishin-ryū during the Azuchi-Momoyama period. Legend has it that he was well known for his skill with the short spear. Kuriyama participated in the Battle of Nagashino on May 4, 1575, on the side of Nobunaga Oda. While fighting against general Katsuhisa Tangonokami Suzuki, Kuriyama's spear was cut in half. Kuriyama kept on fighting with the cleft spear and eventually defeated Suzuki. Then it is said that he continued into battle, overwhelming the enemies' swords and thoroughly beating them down. From this legend, it is believed that the hanbō was officially included in Kukishin-ryū during the early Edō era.

=== Sōjutsu (槍術) ===
The Kukishin Ryū spear has a total length of 270 cm. The 36 cm to 45 cm spearhead is connected to the shaft with wire, and it has three edges or "blades." It is used to parry, slash, stab, strike and to unbalance opponents.

The spear techniques in Kukishin-ryū integrate a myriad of complex variations and nuances. It is considered the most difficult and complicated weapon in the curricula to learn. It has a number of targets which can be reached from both long and short distances and at each distance, meaning a slight divergence in the way the weapon is used is needed in order to make it effective. Its correct use depends entirely on distance and timing for the wielder.

== Kukishin-ryū Today ==
Today there are older and modern branches of the ryū still active.

There some Schools which still train Kukishin Ryu:

- Kukishin-ryu Bojutsu under 19. Soke Fumon Tanaka
- Hontai Yōshin-ryū under 19. Soke Kyoichi Inoue
- Motoha Yoshin Ryu under Soke Yasumoto Akiyoshi
- Takagi Ryu under 19. Soke Kusuhara Juhei
- Bujinkan teaches a branch called Kuki Shinden-Ryū Happō Biken under Masaaki Hatsumi, Unsui Manaka of the Jinenkan, Sukh Sandhu of the Gi Yu Kyo Kai, and Shoto Tanemura of the Genbukan have their own branches.

The Kuki family maintains the family line, which is called "Kukamishin Ryu" (the name before 2016 was "Kukishin-Ryu Tenshin Hyoho"), led by Eichoku Takatsuka under the supervision of the current 28th Soke, Ietaka Kuki. The "Kukishinden Tenshin Hyoho" is a different line and uses just a similar name. Kogenshakai teaches a branch called "Kukushin-ryu Tenshin Hyoho" under Fumio Hirokawa and David Alonso.

These branches maintain their own lineages, techniques and histories, usually stemming from the main family line.
