= Takagi Yōshin-ryū =

Takagi Yoshin-ryū
- Ko-ryū

Arts taught
- Art: Description
- Jujutsu: Hybrid art, unarmed or with minor weapons
- Bōjutsu: Staff art
- Kenjutsu: Sword art
- Iaijutsu: Sword drawing art
- Naginatajutsu: Glaive art
- Tessenjutsu: Iron fan art
- Hojōjutsu: Rope-tying and restraining art
- Sakkatsuhō: Resuscitation methods

Ancestor schools
- Takenouchi-ryū, Kukishin-ryū

Takagi Yoshin-ryū (高木揚心流, lit. 'Takagi Heart of the Willow School') is a school of classical Japanese martial arts. It was founded by Ito Sukesada, based on techniques that he learned from an ascetic named So Unryu. He taught this system to a samurai named Takagi Oriuemon Shigenobu, and Takagi's name was added to the school's. Takagi was already a teacher of jūtaijutsu (柔体術, lit. 'supple-body art') an unarmed grappling system similar to the Chinese art of taijiquan. He was recognised as a shihan by Emperor Higashiyama in 1695.

The Takagi-ryū was influenced by other arts, particularly Takenouchi-ryū and Kukishin-ryū. A match between the headmasters of the Takagi and Kukishin styles in the 17th century led to further cross-training between the two schools.

== See also ==
- Hontai Yōshin-ryū
- Takenouchi-ryū
- Kukishin-ryū
- Bujinkan
- Genbukan
- Jinekan
