= Sōsuishi-ryū =

Japanese martial art

Sōsuishi-ryū 双水執流
- Ko-ryū

Foundation
- Founder: Futagami Hannosuke Masaaki
- Date founded: c.17th century
- Period founded: Early Edo period

Current information
- Current headmaster: Manzo Shitama

Arts taught
- Art: Description
- Kumi Uchi: Hybrid art (unarmed or with minor weapons)
- Koshi-no-Mawari: Iaijutsu (Sword Drawing & fencing)

Ancestor schools
- Futagami-ryū; Takenouchi-ryū

Descendant schools
- Judo

Sōsuishi-ryū (双水執流), also known as Sōsuishitsu-ryū, is a traditional Japanese martial art founded in 1650 that focuses on Kumi Uchi (jujutsu) and Koshi no Mawari (iaijutsu and kenjutsu). The name of the school also appears in ancient densho (scrolls documenting the ryūha) as Sōsuishi-ryū Kumi Uchi Koshi No Mawari (双水執流組討腰之廻) and in the book Sekiryūkan No Chōsen, which was approved and published by the Shadanhōjin Sekiryūkan in 2003. In the Bugei Ryūha Daijiten (an encyclopedia on classical Japanese martial arts), Sōsuishi-ryū is cross referenced and listed under the entry/title of "Futagami-ryū." It includes a brief categorization, history and description of the school.

== History of Sōsuishi-ryū ==
The legend of the founding of Sōsuishi-ryū dates back to Futagami Hannosuke Masaaki in 1650 CE. He was a district samurai living in Chikuzen Province, which was in the domain of Kuroda during the era called Shōhō. (now Fukuoka Prefecture). Futagami was a practitioner of his family martial art Futagami-ryū (二上流) and a high-level student of Takenouchi-ryū. He felt the techniques of Futagami-ryū were imperfect, so in order to improve them he decided to travel all over Japan and train himself by going on a pilgrimage. At one point he went deep into the mountainous, rugged valley of Mt. Yoshino, where for thirty-seven days he trained and sought enlightenment. He refined the finer points of the technique of Futagami-ryū and honed the secret teachings that he had studied. He then assembled them into what he believed were the best of everything he had learned. One day, while he was gazing at the Yoshino river, he noticed the water flowing and swirling together steadily. The training of his mind, body and spirit converged at that one moment into a revelation. This event, called satori in Japanese, prompted him to change the name of Futagami-ryū to Sōsuishi-ryū in remembrance of his experiences at the Yoshino river.

=== The Shitama family ===
Shitama Matashichi was a samurai also from the Chikuzen and a friend to Futagami Hannosuke Masaaki, who extended an invitation to him to come and stay at his house in Nōgata. It was there that Masaaki disclosed the teachings of Sōsuishi-ryū to Shitama. Since this time, Sosuishi-ryū has been handed down and instructed by the Shitama family. On the five occasions where the Shitama family were unable to head the school, the ryū had to be looked after by another until a male heir, bearing the Shitama name, could step in and inherit it. On occasion a "yōshi" or "adopted son" from outside the family would be brought in to marry one of the daughters or cousins who had the surname "Shitama" in order to continue the lineage. After marriage the yōshi would change their surname to the wife's surname and inherit the ryū, continuing the family bloodline for the next generation. (Note: This practice is common in Japan and is accepted today as a way of keeping family names from dissolving. It was established during, or perhaps well before, the feudal-era of Japan's history in order to keep family names intact after the loss of an only son). The art and family line continues in Fukuoka city today. The successor to Shitama Manzo is currently his son, Shitama Shusaku.

In 1888, a menkyo kaiden (grandmaster) of Sōsuishi-ryū moved to Tokyo and began teaching the martial arts to the Akasaka Police . His name was Matsui Hyakutaro Munetada.

=== Matsui Hyakutaro Munetada ===
Munetada was born in Fukuoka on February of Genji year 1 (1864). He was the first son of Matsui Kakitsu who was the samurai of Fukuoka han. As a boy he was fascinated with martial arts so he started to train with his uncle Matsui Kōkichi, a Shingen no Maki (The term for menkyo kaiden prior to the Shōwa period) in Tenshin Jigō-ryū and direct student of Sōsuishi-ryū under 11th generation sōke (inheritor) Shitama Munetsuna. Munetada also began training under Shitama Munetsuna and received a Shingen No Maki in Sōsuishi-ryū. In Meiji year 16 (1883), when he was 19 years old, Munetada completed the Senbondori (1000 matches) in Fukuoka. In the year Meiji year 21 (1888), the Metropolitan Police Board invited Munetada a position training the officers of the Akasaka Police. He moved to Tokyo that year and opened a private dōjō, the Shobukan, on the premises of Duke Ichijo's Palace in Fukuyoshi-cho, Akasaka to teach martial arts. In Meiji year 38 (1905), he was given "Seiren sho" (recognition of good training/work) and then was awarded "Kyoshi-go" (head-instructor title) in June of Meiji year 42 (1909). He remained in his position for 30 years, until retirement. At the same time, he dedicated himself to opening a Seifukujutsu as a business for all Judo ka. He was the president of the Dai Nippon Judo Seifukujutsu until his death. The Butokukai awarded the title of Hanshi to him during May of Showa year 2 (1927). His line of Sōsuishi-ryū is sometimes referred to as the Tōkyō-den or "Matsui-ha" and it continues in Tokyo today.

=== The Sekiryūkan and Sōsuishi-ryū today ===
The following is an excerpt taken directly from the Shadanhōjin Sekiryūkan website:

Throughout its history, a decline in the popularity of Sōsuishi-ryū has often posed a real threat to its survival. However, the inheritors have always prevented this by learning and incorporating other techniques and theories such as Ogasawara-ryū and Kyūshin-ryū, so that the tradition remains alive and relevant, and that the technique of Sōsuishi-ryū is continuously developed. Today, this responsiveness to alternative disciplines is still maintained by the current 16th Master, Manzo Shitama, ensuring that Sōsuishi-ryū technique continues to evolve.

The legacy of Sōsuishi-ryū from past masters comprises such a vast and complicated array of techniques that it is nowadays simplified to make it easier to learn. This was initiated by the 15th Master Shusaku Shitama, to make Sōsuishi-ryū accessible to as many people as possible, in recognition of increasing popular interest in classical martial arts.

== Techniques and characteristics ==
The techniques of Sōsuishi-ryū correspond with other ryūha founded during the Keicho and the early Edo period of Japan. For example: atemi (striking) is used to distract the enemy; a lack of overly complex joint locking techniques; weapons retention techniques (including the use of both long and short swords); defenses against armed and unarmed enemies; and the use of defensive and offensive tactics. There are several basic and advanced techniques in Sōsuishi-ryū, such as atemi, ukemi (breakfalls), tai sabaki (body awareness/positioning), kansetsu waza (joint locks) and nage waza (throws). Some aspects are almost identical and directly correlate to those found in Takenouchi-ryū such as: torite, hade, kogusoku and kumi-uchi.

The kata in Sōsuishi-ryū encourages the practitioners to not only practice defensive tactics as the defender (ware or tori), but to also offensive and sometimes predatory tactics are used against the "attacker" (teki or uke). This method of learning is intended to create a heightened sensitivity, augmenting the awareness of body language and openings when attacking or defending.

Within the Sekiryūkan, the Sōsuishi-ryū syllabus consists of forty eight kumi-uchi kata, divided into five skill sets: Idori (seated methods) (居捕)- 8 techniques; Tai-Toshu (unarmed methods) (対通手)- 8 techniques with variations (henka waza); Yotsu-Gumi (armored methods) (四組) - 8 techniques; Tai-Kodachi (short-sword methods) (対小太刀) - 8 techniques; and Sonota (others) (其他) - 7 techniques. In addition to its repertoire of close combat methods, the tradition also contains a number of iaijutsu and kenjutsu techniques contained under the collective umbrella term, Koshi No Mawari (腰之廻) making the ryū a sōgō bujutsu (総合武術) or "comprehensive martial art".

Koshi No Mawari means "Around the hips" when translated into English. It refers to the concept that anything expedient around the area of the hips can be used as a weapon. As with most koryū, this would commonly be a kodachi (short-sword) or an uchigatana/katana (long-sword), however upon exploring this concept, other weapons and objects can be utilized.

== Locations ==
=== Sōsuishi-ryū in Japan ===
Today, Sōsuishi-ryū has three schools in Japan.

The Shitama family line of Sōsuishi-ryū is practiced at the Shadanhōjin Sekiryūkan (社団法人隻流館), the hombu (本部) dōjō (home dōjō) of the ryu, located in Fukuoka. It is headed by the current hereditary shihan (head teacher), Manzo Shitama.

And two groups that currently claim to be a representative of Matsui Hyakutarō's tradition, the Kōsonkai (光尊会) and the Seirenkan (清漣館道場). Matsui Hyakutarō's first successor, Sugiyama Shōtarō, who also happens to be one of the founders of the Kobudo Shinkōkai, transmitted the school to Kitajima Kokū. Kitajima Kokū named the branch "Kōsonkai" and was later succeeded by Shimamura Takeshi, then Manabu Ito, and finally by Kimura Akio., current headmaster of the branch. The Kōsonkai is mainly based in Yorii machi (Saitama). The Seirenkan, led by Usuki Yoshihiko is an independent organization created after Usuki Yoshihiko left the Kōsonkai (after the death of Kitajima Kokū). It is dedicated to the preservation of Sōsuishi-ryū's teachings as passed down from Matsui Hyakutarō. While these schools practice independently of each other, Manabu Itō and Yoshihiko Usuki have traveled to the Sekiryukan to train with Shitama Sensei and view Manzō Shitama as the hereditary Shihan of Sōsuishi-ryū.

=== Sōsuishi-ryū outside Japan ===
Sōsuishi-ryū is taught in several dōjō outside Japan.

In Australia, Sōsuishi-ryū was represented by Patricia Harrington (Kuraizume) from 1965 until early 2016. Harrington studied Sosuishi-ryu Jujutsu under the 15th Inheritor, Shusaku Shitama in 1964. Harrington was supported by Betty Huxley and Michael Huxley (until they both died).

Since 2016, Sōsuishi-ryū has been represented in Australia by Thomas Crooks, Gomokuroku and Kyōshi and Peter Williams, Gomokuroku and Kyōshi, founders of Kumataka Dojos. From November 2023 they are the Australia New Zealand Regional Directors of the Sōsuishi-ryū Jūjutsu Kai. Crooks and Williams are both direct students of Shitama Manzo Sensei. Dojos are located in Epping and St George, Sydney, Bayswater, Perth (Australia) and Mukdahan (Thailand). As of April 2018 the United States/Americas region is led by Sōsuishi-ryū Regional Directors William Kinkel, Rokumokuroku, and Shihan, and Bill Williams, Rokumokuroku and Shihan. Both Bill Kinkel and Bill Williams are direct students of Shitama Manzo, the hereditary Dai-Menkyo of Sōsuishi-ryū. Bill Williams is the Owner and Chief Instructor at the Seibukan Dojo in Forest Hills, New York.

The Seirenkan dōjō is led by Yoshihiko Usuki and is located in Tokyo, the Seirenkan also has International branch schools located in Singapore, Italy, the United Kingdom in the city of London and in the United States in Chicago, Illinois, North Carolina and in Portland, Oregon. The Kosonkai Dōjō led by Kimura Akio has no international schools and is located solely in Saitama.
