= Yōshin-ryū (disambiguation) =

Yōshin-ryū is a traditional school of Japanese martial arts founded in the mid 17th century by Akiyama Shirobei Yoshitoki. However, a number of other traditional schools were named or referred to as Yōshin-ryū, including:

- Takagi Yōshin-ryū (高木流柔術), founded in the mid 17th century by Takagi Oriemon Shigetoshi
- Hontai Yōshin-ryū (本體楊心流), a branch of Takagi Yōshin-ryū
- Moto-ha Yōshin-ryū (本派揚心流), a descendant of Hontai Yōshin-ryū
- Shindō Yōshin-ryū (新道楊心流), derived from Miura Yōshin-ryū and Tenjin Shin'yo-ryu
- Miura Yōshin-ryū (Yōshin Koryū) (楊心流), founded c.1610 by Nakamura Sakyodaiyū Yoshikuni, who took the name Miura Yōshin
