= Araki-ryū =

Japanese koryū bujutsu martial art

- Ko-ryū

Foundation
- Founder: Araki Muninsai

Arts taught
- Art: Description
- Jujutsu: Hybrid art, unarmed or with minor weapons
- Bōjutsu: Staff art
- Kenjutsu: Sword art
- Bakken: Sword drawing art
- Naginatajutsu: Glaive art
- Hojōjutsu: Rope-tying and restraining art
- Kusarimono: Chained weaponry
- Kenshibu: Dance with sword and fan
- Shigin: Singing of poetry

Ancestor schools
- Takenouchi-ryū

Descendant schools
- Araki-ryū gunyo-kogusoku Maebashi-Han Araki-ryū

Demonstration of the Chigiriki, a common flail type weapon in araki-ryū.

Araki-ryū (荒木流) is a Japanese koryū martial art founded during the Sengoku jidai by Araki Muninsai Minamoto no Hidetsuna (荒木夢仁斎源秀縄). Araki-ryu is a comprehensive system that specializes in the use and application of many traditional Japanese weapons such as spear, glaive, long and short sword, staff, rope, chain and sickle, and torite-kogusoku (grappling in light armor with weapons).

== Introduction ==
Araki-ryū was founded in the Tensho period, approximately 1573. Its creation is attributed to Araki Mujinsai (or Muninsai) Minamoto no Hidetsuna. Torite-kogusoku techniques are the central focus of the martial tradition. Through an examination of the records of over forty lines of Araki-ryu, almost all emanate from the 2nd generation Mori Kasuminosuke. Araki-ryū spread quite widely throughout Japan: traditionally, upon receiving a teaching license, one established one's own independent dojo or line. Nonetheless, those separate lines maintained the same central set of grappling techniques.

Currently, the central line of this martial tradition is located in Isezaki village in Japan, started by 9th generation shihan Komine Bundayu, and his student, Kurihara Gomoji Masashige. The Isezaki line has preserved much of the original curriculum, though there is no way of knowing how close its current expression is to the original version. The Isezaki line focuses on an emphasis on grappling with weaponry. They also have numerous weapon-on-weapon kata, most likely developed through exchanges among the martial traditions of the area, most notably Kashima Shinden Jikishinkage-ryū and Kiraku-ryū.

== The founder: Araki Mujinsai Minamoto no Hidetsuna (荒木夢仁斎源秀縄) ==
In the Honcho Bugei Shoden (pub. 1711–1715 CE), there is a passage that states, "No one knows where Araki Mujinsai is from, and little is known of his deeds, yet his excellent techniques in torite are renowned." Some lines of Araki-ryu speculate that he is from the family of the warlord Araki Murashige, who served as a general under Oda Nobunaga, but there is absolutely no documentary evidence to that assertion.

Oral tradition of the ryūha asserts that Araki Mujinsai fought in the Chosen no Eki [war with Korea] and received praise from Hideyoshi, from whom he received the title, Nihon Kaizan, literally "Japan's opener of mountains."

Common to all lines of Araki-ryû that descended through Mori Kasumi is the story which tells of the formation of the school. In Araki-ryû torite saitan no jo (The rebirth of Araki-ryû), a text allegedly written by Araki Mujinsai, he refers to Fujiwara no Katsuzane (AKA Katsuzane) as the founder of the school. (NOTE: Although there is no definitive proof, there is some historical evidence within the annals of Takenouchi-ryū that Fujiwara Katsuzane studied with the founder of Takenouchi-ryū, Takenouchi Hisamori, and that this name may be a pseudonym for Miyamoto Munisai, the father of Miyamoto Musashi, as this is almost identical to Munisai's kaimyo (post-death Buddhist appellation).

In this text, it asserts that Katsuzane like so many other founders of martial traditions before and after him, went to a mountain shrine, in Fujiwara's case, Atagoyama Dai Gongen, praying unceasingly [Atagodaiyama is a shrine in Kyoto Prefecture under the auspices of a mountain elemental, a tengu Tarōbō daimyogi (太郎坊) of Mount Atago. After one hundred days of austerities, Fujiwara became, "enlightened into the mysteries of combat, and from that time forward, it became easy for him to defeat the strongest men throughout Japan." This text, that is ubiquitous among lines of Araki-ryū, is written almost as if it is an interview of a student speaking with his teacher about HIS teacher created the school, describing how austere training at the same level of the founder is necessary to carry on this tradition to the next generation.

== Modern times ==
Araki-ryû was maintained in many areas of Japan, but by the 20th century, most lines became extinct. There are three remaining lines in Japan.

1. Two factions of Araki-ryū located in Isezaki, maintained by Kikuchi Kunimitsu and Suzuki Seiichiro. Although they chose to maintain their own dojo and separate administration, they are fundamentally the same. Araki-ryu was designated a cultural treasure of Isezaki in 1967
2. Araki-ryū gunyō-kogusoku, a tradition descending from Araki Buzaemon, quite distinct in many respects from the Isezaki Araki-ryū, but also sharing many elements in common. There is documentary evidence that Buzaemon was the founder of a jujutsu school known as Araki Shin-ryū, and Araki-ryū gunyō-kogusoku is an amalgam of that line along with a line of classical Araki-ryu descended from Yamamoto Tabei, one of the most influential individuals in Araki-ryū history.
3. Araki Mujinsai-ryu iaido – there are several factions of this group which exclusively practices sword drawing. Other than claiming the same founder, there is no apparent relationship in either technique or the names of the kata within the curriculum with other lines of Araki-ryū.
