= Shuriken =

Throwable Japanese concealed weapon

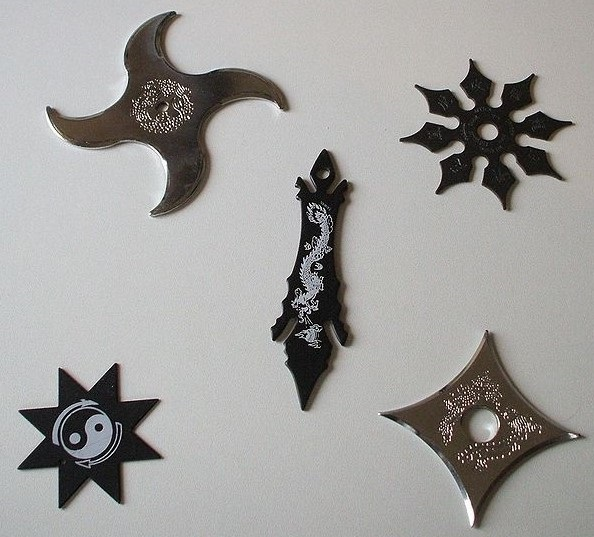
Five types of shuriken

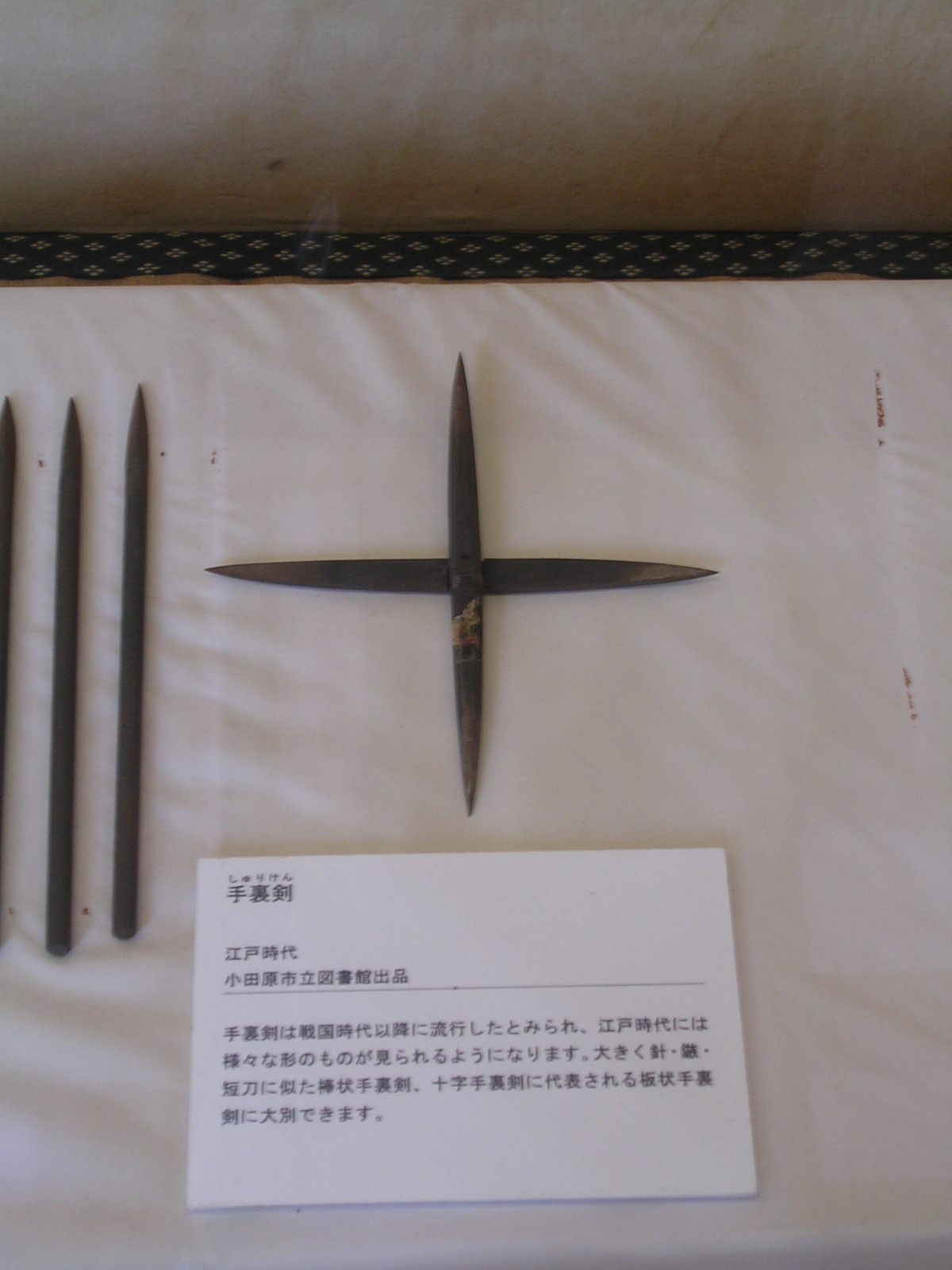
Edo period shuriken in Odawara Castle Museum, Japan. Note the senbon darts.

A shuriken (Japanese: 手裏剣; lit. 'hand-hidden blade') is a Japanese concealed weapon used by samurai or ninja or in martial arts as a hidden dagger or metsubushi to distract or misdirect.

== History ==
The origins of the bo-shuriken in Japan are still unclear, despite continuing research.

This is partly because shurikenjutsu was a secret art and also due to the fact that throughout early Japanese history there were many independent exponents of the skill of throwing long, thin objects.

The earliest-known reference to a school teaching shurikenjutsu is Ganritsu Ryu, active during the 17th century.

This school utilized a long, thin implement with a bulbous head, thought to be derived from the arrow.

Surviving examples of blades used by this school appear to combine an arrow's shape with that of a needle traditionally used in Japanese leatherwork and armor manufacture.

There are earlier mentions in written records, such as the Osaka Gunki (大阪軍記, the military records of Osaka), of the standard knife and short sword being thrown in battle.

Miyamoto Musashi is said to have won a duel by throwing his short sword at his opponent, killing him.

== Types ==
Shuriken are also known as throwing stars, ninja stars, or by the misnomers Chinese stars and Chinese throwing stars, although they were originally constructed in many different shapes.

In North American English, star-shaped shuriken have sometimes been referred to as Chinese stars or Chinese throwing stars. The terms are misnomers because shuriken are Japanese concealed weapons, not Chinese weapons. A 1985 martial-arts equipment advertisement in Black Belt listed an eight-point "Chinese Star" among "Throwing Stars."

These misnomers also appear in U.S. legal sources. Rhode Island law describes a multi-pronged star with sharpened edges as "commonly known as a Chinese throwing star"; Connecticut law includes "chinese star" in its definition of a martial arts weapon; older Indiana Code language defined "Chinese throwing star"; and a Florida appellate decision referred to a "Chinese throwing star, or shuriken."

=== Bo-shuriken ===
A bō shuriken (棒手裏剣, stick shuriken) is a throwing weapon consisting of a straight iron or steel spike, usually four-sided but sometimes round or octagonal in section. Some examples have points on both ends.

The length ranges from 12 to 21 cm (4 1/2 to 8 1/2 in) and the average weight from 35 to 150 g (1 1/4 to 5 1/4 oz).

Bo-shuriken were constructed from a wide variety of everyday items, and as such came in many shapes and sizes.

Some derived their names from the materials of which they were made, such as kugi-gata (nail form), hari-gata (needle form) and tantō-gata (knife form); some were named after an object of similar appearance, such as hoko-gata (spear form), matsuba-gata (pine-needle form); while others have names that are purely descriptive, such as kankyuto (piercing tool form), kunai-gata (utility tool form), or teppan (plate metal) and biao (pin).

The bo-shuriken is thrown in a number of ways, such as overhead, underarm, sideways and rearwards, but in each case the throw involves the blade sliding out of the hand through the fingers in a smooth, controlled flight.

The major throwing methods are the jiki da-ho (direct-hit method), and the han-ten da-ho (turning-hit method). These two are technically different, in that the former does not allow the blade to spin before it hits the target, while the latter requires that the blade spin.

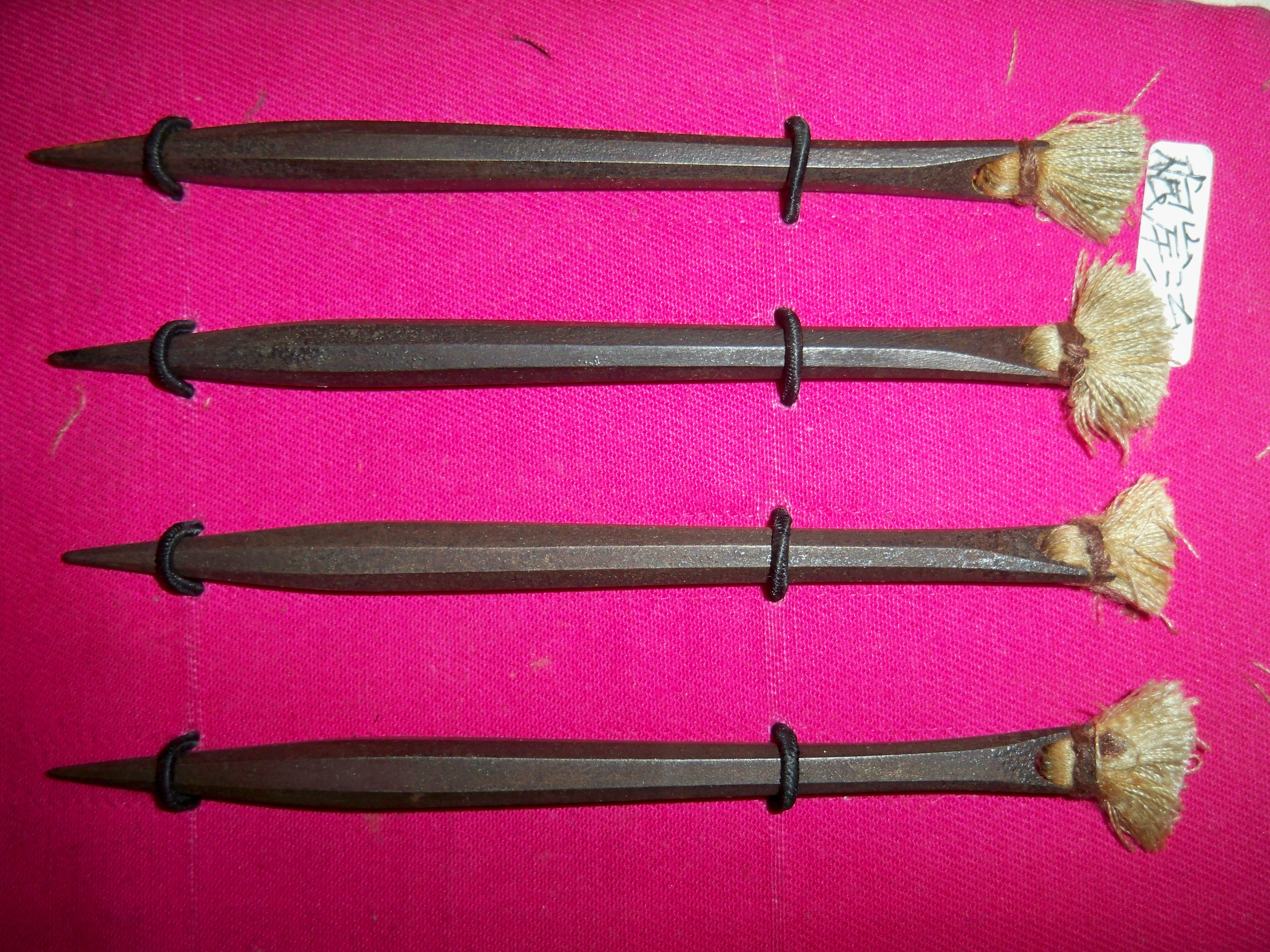
Four antique forged Japanese bo shuriken (iron throwing darts with linen flights)

Other items such as hairpins, kogata (utility knife), and chopsticks were thrown in the same way as bo-shuriken, although they were not associated with any particular school of shurikenjutsu.

=== Hira shuriken/shaken ===
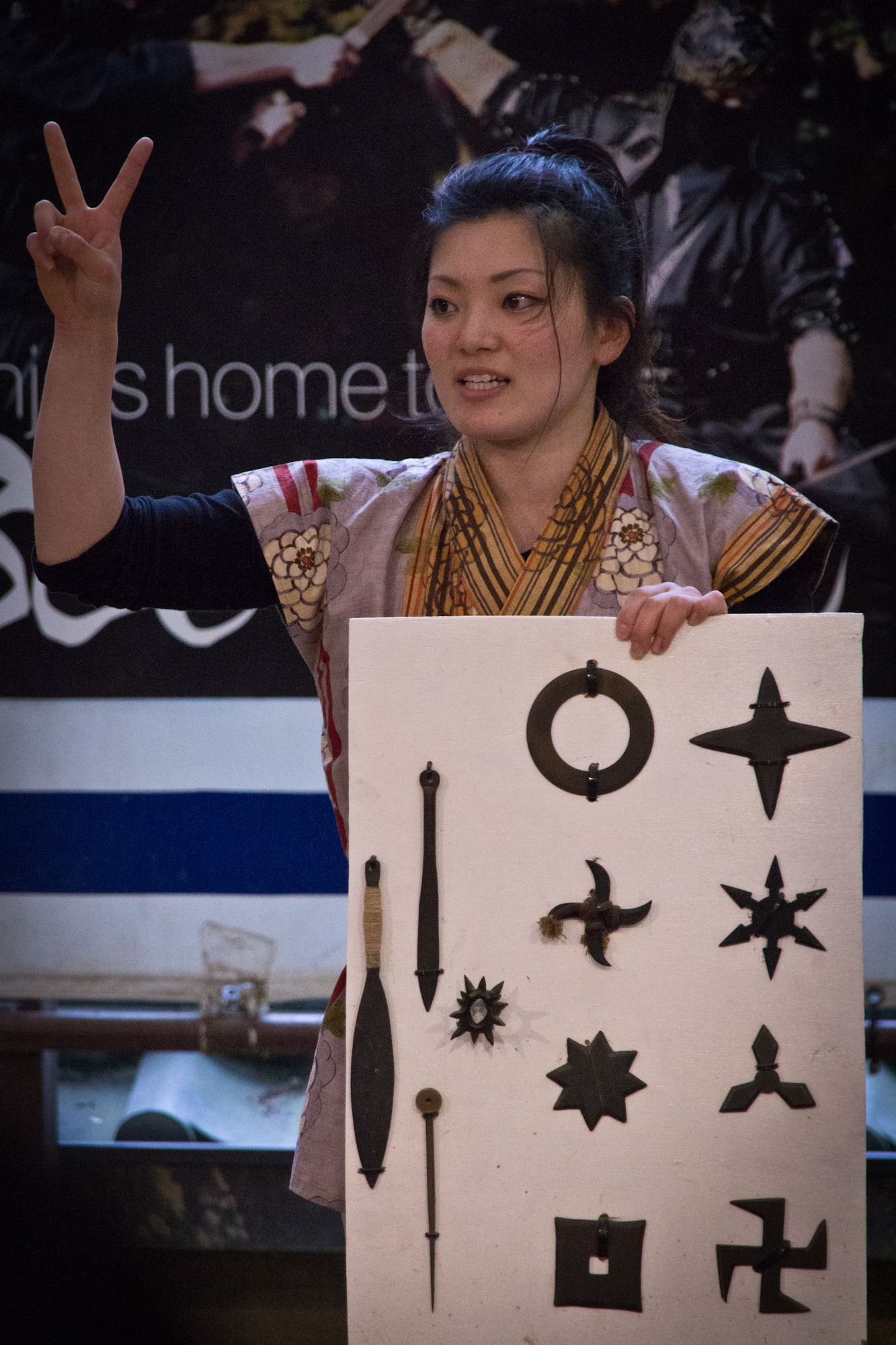
Various types of shuriken at the Iga-ryū Ninja Museum

Hira shuriken (平手裏剣, flat shuriken) or shaken (車剣, wheel shuriken; also read as kurumaken) generally resemble the popular conception of shuriken.

They are constructed from thin, flat plates of metal derived from a variety of sources including hishi-gane (coins), kugi-nuki (carpentry tools), spools, and senban (nail removers).

They often have a hole in the center and possess a fairly thin blade sharpened mainly at the tip. The holes derive from their source in items that had holes—old coins, washers, and nail-removing tools.

This proved convenient for the shuriken user as the weapons could be strung on a string or dowel in the belt for transport, and the hole also had aerodynamic and weighting effects that aided the flight of the blade.

There are a wide variety of forms of hira-shuriken and they are now usually identified by the number of points the blades possess.

As with bo-shuriken, the various shapes of hira-shuriken were usually representative of a particular school (ryū) or region that preferred the use of such shapes, and it is therefore possible to identify the school by the type of blade used.

== Usage ==
Shuriken functioned as supplementary weapons to the sword or to other weapons in a samurai's arsenal, although they often had an important tactical effect in battle.

=== Effective areas ===
Shuriken targets were primarily the more exposed parts of the body: the eyes, face, hands, or feet.

Shuriken, despite low mass, were capable of dealing lethal blows at short ranges. In some cases, shuriken were capable of cutting through the abdominal wall and damaging the intestines.

Shuriken, especially hira-shuriken, were also used in novel ways—they could be embedded in the ground, injuring those who stepped on them (similar to a caltrop), wrapped in a fuse to be ignited and thrown to cause fire, or wrapped in a cloth soaked in poison and lit to cover an area with a cloud of poisonous smoke.

They could also be used as a handheld weapon in close combat.

There are reports of shuriken being coated with poison, intended either as a throwing weapon or to be left in a conspicuous place for a victim to pick up.

Other reports indicate that shuriken may have been buried in dirt or animal feces and allowed to harbor the bacterium Clostridium tetani - if the point penetrated a victim deeply enough, the bacteria transferred into the wound could cause a then-incurable tetanus infection.

=== Shurikenjutsu ===
The art of wielding the shuriken is known as shurikenjutsu and was taught as a minor part of the martial-arts curriculum of many famous schools, such as Yagyū Shinkage-ryū, Tenshin Shōden Katori Shintō-ryū, Ittō-ryū, Kukishin-ryū, and Togakure-ryū.

== Legality ==
Modern commercially available shuriken, which are sold in Europe and North America, are often made of stainless steel.

However, in many countries and jurisdictions, they are illegal to possess or carry, such as in Belgium, the Netherlands, Canada, Germany, and the United Kingdom (manufacture, sale, distribution and import).

In the United States, they are prohibited in some states, such as California and New York. In some cases they may be allowed, but may still be subject to specific local legislation. Owners may be required to possess a certificate for possession.

== Cultural legacy ==
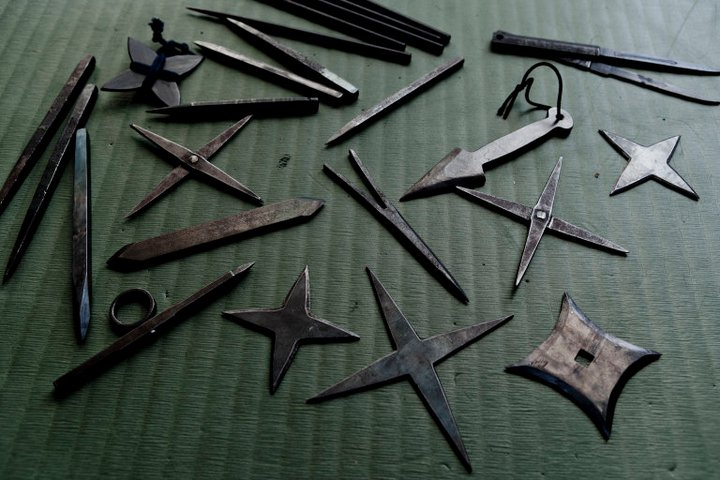
Various forms of shuriken

Shuriken are simple weapons, but their historical value has increased.

Unlike the katana and other bladed weapons, antique shuriken are not often well preserved (although some are blackened in ash to prevent corrosion), largely due to their expendable nature.

== See also ==
- List of martial arts weapons
- Batarang
- Boomerang
- Chakram
- Kunai
- Makibishi
- Throwing knife
- Plumbata
- Wind and fire wheels
