= German ju-jutsu =

German martial art

German Ju-Ji tsu
- Also known as: JJ, Hybrid Combat Ju-Jutsu
- Focus: Hybrid
- Country of origin: West Germany
- Famous practitioners: Franz-Josef Gresch
- Parenthood: Jujutsu, Judo, Aikido, Karate, Muay Thai, Wing Chun, Sambo, Arnis
- Olympic sport: No
- Official website: www.ju-jutsu.de

German Ju-Jutsu (or German Jiu-Jitsu; German: Deutsches Ju-Jutsu) is a martial art related to traditional Japanese Jujutsu, developed in West Germany in the 1960s using techniques from Jujutsu, Judo, Karate and various other traditional and modern martial arts. The system is taught to the German police forces.

== Terminology ==
In Germany, Ju-Jutsu and Jiu-Jitsu denote two distinct martial arts. The Deutscher Ju-Jutsu-Verband (DJJV), the sport's national governing body, administers both as separate disciplines: it applies Ju-Jutsu to the modern self-defence system developed in Germany, and Jiu-Jitsu to traditional Japanese jujutsu.

Practitioners of Ju-Jutsu and Jiu-Jitsu in Germany routinely observe the distinction, while outside this context it is often unfamiliar and a frequent source of confusion. In English-language usage, jujutsu, ju-jitsu and jiu-jitsu are largely interchangeable spellings of the same term.

== History ==
In 1967, members of the Deutsche Dan-Kollegium (DDK, German Dan Council) started developing a new self-defense system mainly based on Judo, Karate, and Aikido. Judo and Aikido are derived from traditional Japanese Jujutsu. A lot of emphasis was put on techniques which could be used in real-life situations.

Over the years, experience from police work and techniques from other martial arts have influenced the system. In 2000, additional techniques from Arnis, Sambo, Wing Chun, Muay Thai and other martial arts were officially incorporated into German ju-jutsu.

== Techniques ==
German ju-jutsu includes atemi, elbow techniques, kicks, knee strikes, throws, ground techniques (taken from judo), various locks, pressure points, and armed techniques, among others, covering all distances. Training includes defense against multiple opponents. Even in the early days, because of the art's mixed origin, practitioners combined strikes and blocks from karate, judo-style throws and grappling techniques, as well as aikido-style joint locks.

== Combat sport ==
Several different competition systems exist. Considering that Jujutsu in certain other European countries has undergone modernization processes that have led to styles similar to German ju-jutsu, international competitions are possible. The German Ju-Jutsu Association was one of the three founding members of the Ju-Jitsu International Federation (JJIF, originally called the European Ju-Jitsu Federation, EJJF), which has focused on developing the sport aspect of Western jujutsu styles. The JJIF is now an international sport federation with national associations in over 70 countries.

At the world level, there are two competition systems: The duo (kata) system involves a pair of practitioners (jujutsuka) from the same team demonstrating self-defence techniques against attacks randomly called by the mat referee. The fighting (striking and grappling) system involves one-on-one combat. In the fighting system, three phases are distinguished, each with slightly different rules. The round begins in the distance fighting phase. Once a grab has been made, the second phase is entered and hits are no longer allowed. The third phase is entered when the jujutsuka are down on the mat. Switching back and forth between all phases is possible, that is, if the jujutsuka managed to stand up again, the first or second phase would recommence.

== Customs ==
The customs are akin to those used in other Japanese budō disciplines:

- Training is performed in a dojo.
- Jujutsugi or judogi are worn.
- A Kyū/dan ranking system is used.

Its governing body in Germany is the DJJV (German: Deutscher Ju-Jutsu Verband). Its competitive sport aspects are coordinated internationally by the JJIF (Ju-Jitsu International Federation); Ju-jutsu under JJIF rules is a part of the World Games and World Combat Games.

== Grandmasters ==
Name	Graduation	Note
Franz-Josef Gresch	10. Dan	One of the founders of German Ju-Jutsu, One of the founders of the DJJV, Honorary president of the DJJV
Heinz Lamadé	9. Dan	
Josef Art	9. Dan	
Dieter Call	9. Dan	
Peter Schneider	9. Dan	
Heinrich Conrads	9. Dan	
Peter Nehls	8. Dan	
Norbert van Soest	8. Dan	
Willy Vollberg	8. Dan	
Walter Wehrmann	8. Dan	
Georg Riebartsch	8. Dan	
Rolf Kühnel	8. Dan	
Dieter Rast	8. Dan	
Erich Reinhardt	8. Dan	
Dieter Meyer	8. Dan	
Achim Hanke	8. Dan	
Ralf Pfeifer	8. Dan	
John Simon	8. Dan	
Bernd Thomsen geb. Hillebrand	8. Dan	
Roland Köhler	8. Dan	President of the DJJV, National coach of the DJJV, Vice-president mass sport of the "Ju-Jutsu Verband Bayern e.V." (Bavarian Ju-Jutsu association)
Robert Prümm	8. Dan	
Wolfgang Kroel	8. Dan	
