= Hokutoryu Ju-Jutsu =

Finnish style of jujutsu

- Also known as: Hokutoryu Jujutsu, Hokutoryu Jiu-Jitsu, Finnish Jujutsu
- Focus: Hybrid, Self-Defense
- Hardness: Full-contact
- Country of origin: Finland
- Parenthood: Jujutsu, Boxing, Kickboxing, Isshin-ryū karate
- Olympic sport: No

Hokutoryu Ju-Jutsu is a Finnish style of the Japanese martial art jujutsu created in 1992 by Auvo Niiniketo. The name of the style is Japanese and literally translates as Big Dipper-style, though is more commonly translated as North Star-style. The style uses a Japanese name to show respect to the country of origin of jujutsu. Practitioners of the style can be recognized by the logo of the style on their jujutsugi, a red inversed triangle.

The style does not rely on physical strength and instead relies on speed, timing and "martial eye". The techniques of the style contain punches, kicks, throws, takedowns, jointlocks, chokes, pins, breakfalls, clinch fighting, ground fighting and weapon techniques. The style also features sparring and training against both armed and unarmed opponents as an important part of the style. Style seeks to keep the principles of the traditional Japanese martial art while making it more compatible with western culture.

The style works for both men and women. Roughly 40% of its practitioners are female. Niiniketo notes that women are often more technically proficient, where as men can easily fall back to relying on brute force.

There are roughly 50 Hokutoryu schools around the world and the style has spread to several countries, including but not limited to: Russia, Belarus, Estonia, Iran, Ecuador, United States, Sweden and Norway. Most of the schools however are located in Finland.

== Auvo Niiniketo ==
Sōke Auvo Niiniketo (born 1954) (10th dan), "Father of Finnish Ju-Jutsu" has been training martial arts for most of his life, starting with boxing at the age of eight and winning the national youth championship in 1972 at 75 kg and winning bronze in national championship in 1974. Niiniketo was introduced to English jujutsu style of World Ju-Jitsu Federation (WJJF) in Stockholm, Sweden, during a boxing trip, which immediately appealed to him, seeing it as a complete martial art. After retiring from boxing, he started practicing karate, finding its kicks to be particularly effective. Though he enjoyed kihon, it was kumite that appealed to him the most.

Niiniketo later decided to start training English jujutsu (WJJF). Niiniketo received his first jujutsu belt ranks up to blue belt in Sweden, as Finland did not have a jujutsu dojo at the time. In 1977, he started the first English jujutsu courses in Helsinki and soon after this he opened the first jujutsu dojo in Finland in the city.

In 1978, Niiniketo met English senseis Richard Morris and Robert Clark from World Ju-Jitsu Federation and co-operates with them to this day. In 1979, Niiniketo received his jujutsu black belt from Richard Morris and Robert Clark, who were the authorities of World Ju-Jitsu Federation (WJJF).

During his time in Sweden, Niiniketo continued to cross-train in karate, ultimately winning the Finnish national heavyweight championship in 1979.

In 1980, Niiniketo brought kickboxing to Finland and started building a national team for Finland. He works with kickboxing to this day and represents Finland at WAKO.

In 1992, Auvo Niiniketo created his own fighting style, Hokutoryu Ju-Jutsu.

In 2007, in Hokutoryu's 30th anniversary celebrations, Niiniketo received the rank of 9th dan and the title of sōke from Richard Morris.

In 2014, in his 60th birthday celebrations, Niiniketo received the rank of 10th dan in Hokutoryu Ju-Jutsu and 6th dan in kickboxing, making him the highest rank holder in both arts in Finland.

In 2015, Niiniketo received the honorary title Counselor of Exercise from Sauli Niinistö, President of Finland.

== Ranks ==
Hokutoryu's rank system is based on the standard Japanese belt color rank system developed by Kanō Jigorō, founder of judo. Rank system consists of kyūs (color belts), dans (black belts) and mons (junior color belts). On top of learning the required techniques, grading requires the jujutsuka to have spent a certain amount of time as their current belt rank, as well as having partaken in a certain amount of classes as their current belt rank. Grading also requires the jujutsuka to have participated in a certain amount of national training camps, though in their case, only the total amount of participations is required, rather than amount of participations as a certain belt rank. There are four national camps each year.

Ranks include:

- 6th kyū/mon, white, starting rank
- 5th kyū/mon, yellow, no time, class or camp requirements but learning the techniques generally takes 2–3 months.
- 4th kyū/mon, orange, requires six months and 40 class participations as a yellow belt and one national camp participation.
- 3rd kyū/mon, green, requires one year and 110 class participations as an orange belt and three national camp participations.
- 2nd kyū/mon, blue, requires one year and 110 class participations as a green belt and five national camp participations.
- 1st kyū/mon, brown, requires one year and 110 class participations as a blue belt and seven national camp participations.

Dan ranks go from 1 to 10 and rank holders generally use a black belt, though at higher dan ranks, red-and-black, red-and-white and red belts may be used. Holder of a black belt is generally known as a sensei. Higher dan ranks might have other titles as well such as shihan, hanshi or kyoshi. Even the 1st dan belt tests are highly demanding and roughly half fail the test.

Black belt requires the jujutsuka to have spent at least 2 years as a brown belt and at least six years in the style in total and have some experience as an instructor of a class. One cannot apply to a black belt test themselves. Instead, their sensei must send an application to the sōke if they believe their student is ready for it. If one successfully completes a black belt test, they receive the title of sensei.

== Randori ==
Randori or free sparring is an important part of the style and a requirement in belt tests from green belt onwards. Randori in Hokutoryu is full-contact. The goal is to use powerful striking techniques to either knock the opponent out or weaken their defence so that they can be thrown or swept down and if necessary, finished with a jointlock or a chokehold.

Randori consists of three parts: stand-up fighting, clinch fighting and ground fighting. Randori always starts with stand-up fighting after which the jujutsuka can move from one part to another.

In stand-up fighting, the jujutsuka is free to use any Ju-Jutsu striking techniques against the torso. Punches or knee strikes to the head are not allowed but kicks are. Low kicks are allowed as long as they aren't straight kicks. Elbow strikes are not allowed to any part of the body. A grounded opponent may be attacked with a kick only if they have their knee on the ground.

In clinch fighting, the jujutsuka may throw, sweep or takedown their opponent by using any technique provided it does not stress the neck or the spine. Jointlocks and chokeholds while taking the opponent down are not allowed but they are still allowed in clinch fighting as long as no attempts at a takedown are made while applying or trying to apply them.

In ground fighting, twisting jointlocks on knees are not allowed under any circumstances. Other than that, any jointlock is allowed as long as it doesn't target the neck, spine or a small joint. Chokeholds are allowed, both ones which use ones own hands and ones which make use of opponents jujutsugi.

Jujutsuka wear blue and red belts in randori to make it easier to tell them apart.

=== Prohibited behavior and techniques ===
The following are considered prohibited behavior and techniques:

- Running away, intentionally falling down, showing fear, turning one’s back or pretending to be injured
- Any unsportsmanlike conduct
- Any comments or protests
- Insults or inappropriate gestures and expressions
- Head-butts
- Punches to the head, throat, neck and upper shoulder area
- Kicks to the throat and neck area
- Strikes to the back, groin or directly against joints
- Knee strikes to the head
- Kicking the opponent on the ground while standing, unless the opponent has a knee on the ground
- Downwards or sideways kicks with the heel of the foot while fighting on the ground
- Straight kicks to legs, knees or ankles
- Any attempted or actual throws, sweeps or takedowns while applying or trying to apply a jointlock or a chokehold
- Jointlocks on the neck or spine
- Any turning or twisting jointlocks which affects the knee joint
- Pulling or twisting the opponents fingers
- Pulling or tearing the opponents jujutsugi
- Any use of unauthorized techniques
- All jointlocks except those targeting the elbow joint in fights between less than 14-year-olds
- All chokeholds in fights between less than 16-year-olds
- Knockouts by kicks to the head in fights between less than 18-year-olds

=== Rule categories ===
Rules are divided into Category A rules and Category B rules. The sparring rules themselves are essentially the same in both Categories but Category B features more protective equipment. Category A equipment includes groin protection and a gum shield. Women must also wear a female chest protector and a headguard, though some organizers may decide against using the latter. In addition to Category A rules, Category B also features elastic shin and instep guards and grappling gloves. In tournaments, all fights may be fought as Category B fights. All national, continental and international championship finals must be fought with Category A rules.

=== Weight classes ===
Hokutoryu contains 13 weight classes, seven for men and six for women. Male weight classes include -65 kg, -73 kg, -80 kg, -86 kg, -94 kg, -100 kg and +100 kg classes. Female weight classes include -52 kg, -60 kg, -66 kg, -72 kg, -78 kg and +78 kg classes.

== Special types ==
In addition to standard Hokutoryu, the style also contains three special types:

- Junior Ju-Jutsu: Made for children between 7 and 14. This type removes techniques which are seen as too dangerous for children, such as chokes, weapon techniques and most jointlocks.
- Police Ju-Jutsu: Made for law enforcement and security guards. Main focus is on encountering a violent person, seizing them and controlling them. As such, this type mainly uses techniques which are useful for controlling the opponent, such as wristlocks, as well as use of special equipment which are not used in standard Hokutoryu, such as handcuffs. Type is used by some police departments in Finland, such as Turku, where a group of police trains twice a week.
- Military Ju-Jutsu: Made for soldiers. As such, it contains lethal techniques which are generally not used in other types of Hokutoryu, though many techniques cross-over with Police Ju-Jutsu. Military Ju-Jutsu is a part of training for cadets, military police and frogmen in the Finnish Defence Forces.
