= Tessenjutsu =

Japanese martial art using iron fan

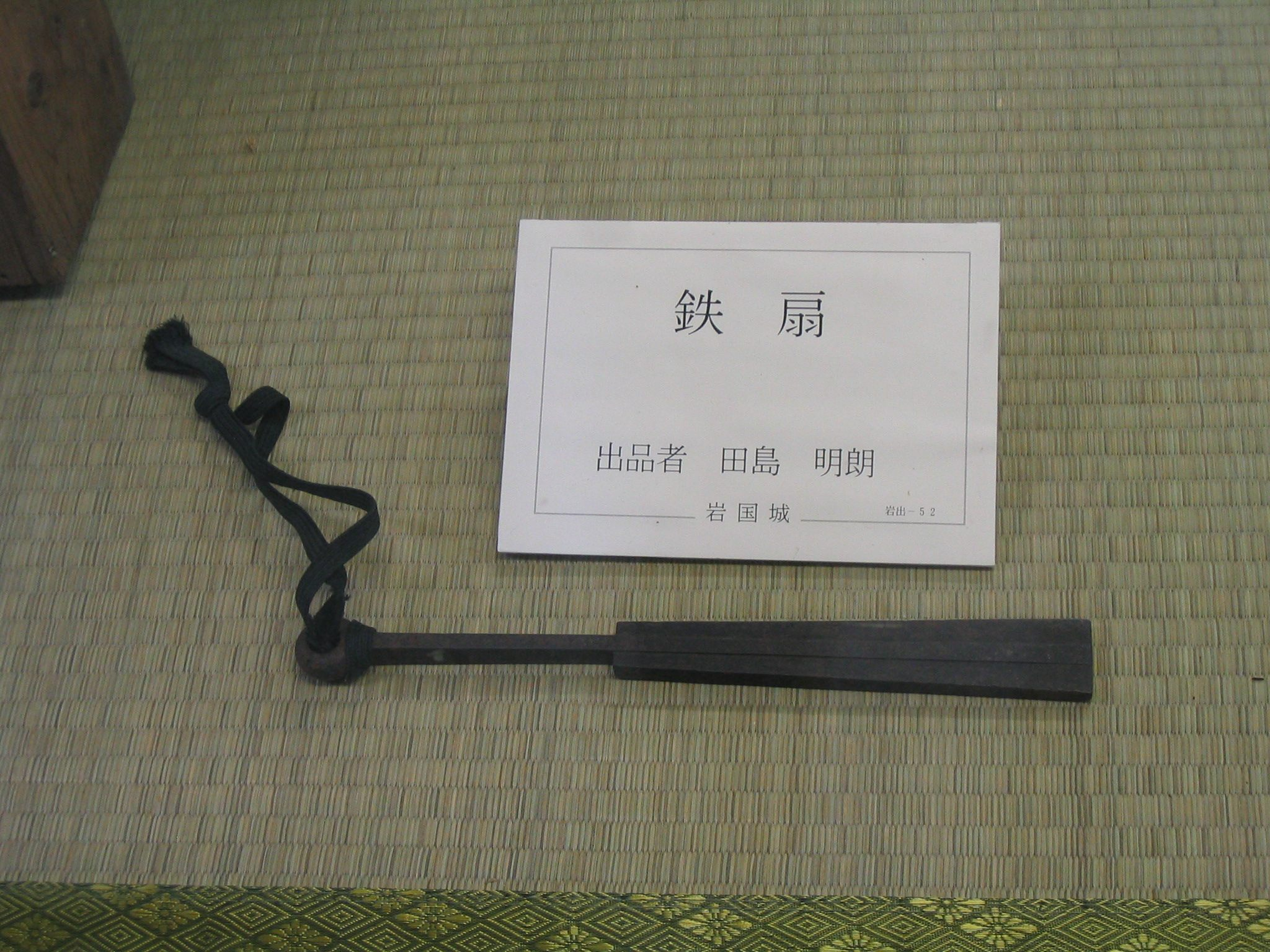
A solid iron tessen fan on display in Iwakuni Castle, Japan

Tessenjutsu (Japanese: 鉄扇術, lit. 'iron fan technique') is the martial art of the Japanese war fan (tessen). It is based on the use of the solid iron fan or the folding iron fan, which usually had eight or ten wood or iron ribs.

The use of the war fan in combat is mentioned in early Japanese legends. For example, Minamoto no Yoshitsune, a hero of Japanese legend, is said to have defeated an opponent named Benkei by parrying the blows of his opponent's spear with an iron fan. This use of the iron fan was said to have been taught to him by a mythological creature, a tengu, who had also instructed him in the art of swordsmanship.

The practitioners of tessenjutsu could acquire a high level of skill. Some became so skilled, in fact, that they were able to defend themselves against an attacker wielding a sword, and even kill an opponent with a single blow. Like so many other Japanese arts of combat during this era, tessenjutsu reached a high level of sophistication. For example, in the late 16th century:

- Sasaki Kojirō was able to defeat several enemies with an iron fan
- Takeda Shingen held off a mounted sword attack by Uesugi Kenshin who had burst into his command tent during the Fourth Battle of Kawanakajima.

Apart from using it in duels against enemies armed with swords and spears, the skilled wielder could also use it to fence and fend off knives and poisoned darts thrown at them. Like a sword, the tessen could be dual-wielded to parry with one hand and attack with the other.

Tessenjutsu is still practiced by a few experts in Japan to this day.
