= Ryū (school) =

Japanese term for a school in any discipline

Ryū (流; mainly used as a suffix, meaning style, type, form, manner, system, school, used here in the sense of ryūha (流派, a school or a school of thought)) is the Japanese term referring to a school in any discipline. The kanji itself is commonly used as a suffix.

In English, the word is frequently used to refer to schools of Japanese martial art, although it can also be found used in other disciplines (for example Nihon-koryū and Sōgetsu-ryū in ikebana, Kantei-ryū in calligraphy, etc.).

== In the martial arts ==
Japanese martial arts are often classified and codified into ryūha. Usually a given style will have its own curriculum, ranks and licensure system. These may be based on the parent style or a combination of sources that form the background of the system.

The name of a style may have particular meaning or may simply be a location. Toyama-ryū is named for the Toyama Military Academy in Japan. In contrast, Gōjū-ryū is the 'hard-soft' style, which indicates both characteristic techniques and thematic elements that form a 'signature' of the style. Sometimes this is merged or confused with the name of the dojo (as is the case with Shōtōkan-ryū karate).

High-level practitioners of an established style may splinter off and form their own derivative styles based on their own experience or interpretation. Sometimes this is encouraged by the parent style, sometimes it represents an ideological schism between senior members of the style. Sometimes, it is done simply for 'marketing' reasons or to adjust a system to modern times.

There is no universal licensing or ranking system across all ryūha. A high-ranking person or black belt in one style does not necessarily correspond to a high-level understanding in another style or group of styles. There are many ryūha in Japan that have existed for many hundreds of years, as well as many more that were created in modern times. The concept of organizing a codified system is obviously not a Japanese or outwardly Asian one, though many international or foreign styles may adopt the nomenclature and systemization of koryū bujutsu ryūha in order to add an air of mystique or legitimacy to their system, or simply as a way to show respect to their roots and background.
