= Edo period police =

1603–1868 period in Japanese policing

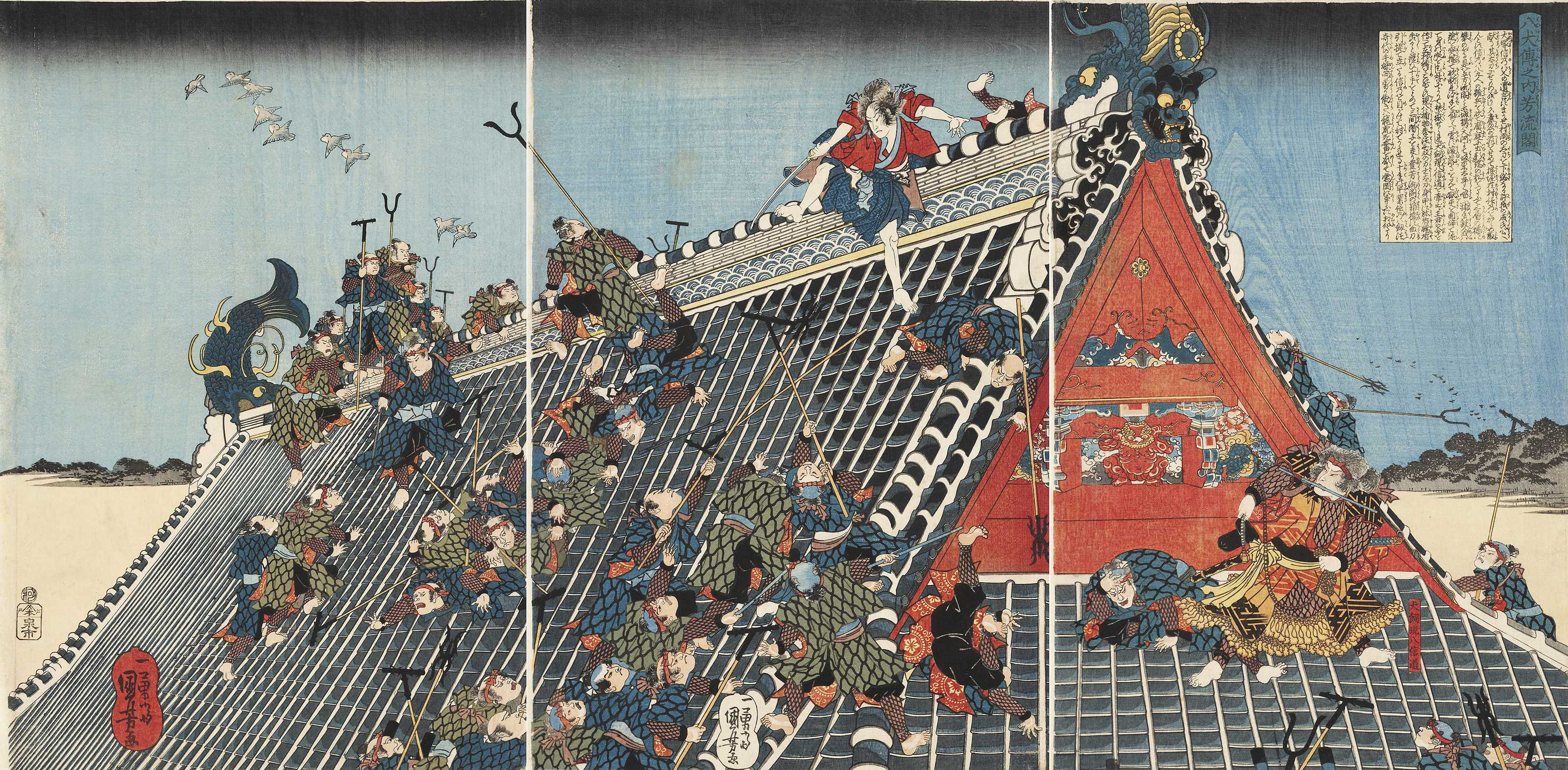
Edo period wood block print showing police wearing chain armour under their kimono, and using jitte, sasumata, sodegarami, and tsukubo to capture criminals on a roof top

In feudal Japan, individual military and citizens groups were primarily responsible for self-defense until the unification of Japan by Tokugawa Ieyasu in 1603. During the Edo period (1603–1868), the Tokugawa shogunate formed a centralized feudal government. Samurai warriors who once protected Japan from foreign enemies and fought each other for supremacy became the new police and internal security force. Their new job would be to ensure civil peace, which they accomplished for over 250 years.

== History ==
During the Edo period the authoritarian Tokugawa shogunate instituted an elaborate police/security state, an administrative hierarchy was developed, and rules and regulations controlling many aspects of life in Japan went into effect. This new system of government has been called a police state, possibly the world's first.

In 1868 the samurai era ended with the overthrow of the Tokugawa shogunate and a new government came into power (Meiji government) and the samurai class was eventually abolished. In 1872, a former samurai, Kawaji Toshiyoshi, was sent to Europe to study systems of policing and he recommended a restructuring based partially on French and Prussian systems. In 1874, a nationalized police force was created using European police systems as a model. This new police force was the start of the modern police system in Japan, though it was initially dominated by former samurai from Satsuma who were part of the driving force behind the removal of the Tokugawa shogunate. The new Meiji period police continued the Edo period method of Japanese police controlling societal behavior and internal security as well as preventing and solving crimes.

== Organization ==
The Edo period police apparatus utilized a multi-layered bureaucracy which employed the services of a wide variety of Japanese citizens. High and low ranking samurai, former criminals, private citizens and even citizen groups (Gonin Gumi) participated in keeping the peace and enforcing the laws and regulations of the Tokugawa shogunate.

=== Samurai police ===
- Machi-bugyō

During the Edo period, high ranking samurai with an allegiance to the Tokugawa shogunate (hatamoto) were appointed machi-bugyō (city administrators or commissioners). The machi-bugyō performed the roles of chief of police, prosecutor, judge and other judicial related business both criminal and civil in Edo and other major towns.

- Yoriki

Working under the machi-bugyō was the yoriki. Yoriki were samurai—they managed patrols and guard units composed of lower ranking police officials. Yoriki, being of a higher class, were able to ride a horse while performing their duties and were trusted to carry out assignments of high importance.

- Dōshin

Working under the yoriki was the dōshin. Dōshin were samurai but of a lower class than yoriki—they performed the duties of prison guard and patrol officer which required close contact with commoners (chonin). They investigated crimes such as murder and helped with executions.

=== Non-samurai police assistants ===
Edo period police relied heavily on commoners for assistance, from average village dwellers to the outcast hinin and eda castes. Members of the Japanese outcast were particularly helpful with guarding and executing prisoners, and disposing the bodies, something that samurai found to be repugnant (distasteful).

- Komono

Komono were non-samurai burakumin who went with the dōshin on patrols and provided assistance.

- Okappiki

Okappiki were non-samurai from the lowest outcast class, often former criminals who worked for the dōshin as informers and spies.

- Gōyokiki/meakashi

Gōyokiki or meakashi were a non-samurai burakumin or outcast class who were hired by local residents and merchants to work as police assistants in a particular neighborhood—they were often former criminals. The term "tesaki" was used to describe gōyokiki or meakashi later in the Edo period.

== Duties ==
Investigating crimes, arresting and interrogating arrested suspects, torturing criminal suspects in order to obtain a confession, punishing convicted criminals including executions.

== Equipment ==
Edo period police used a variety of armor and carried lethal and non-lethal weapons to capture criminal suspects. If possible, suspected criminals were taken alive. This meant that special weapons and tactics had to be created in order to accomplish this task.

=== Weapons ===
- Bansho rokugin or keigo roku-go: Edo period police stations were required to keep six kinds of weapons (bansho rokugin or keigo roku-go) available for use in case of disturbances. these were the kanamuchi, the kiriko no bo, the tetto, the sodegarami, the tsukubo, and the sasumata. Three of these tools were called torimono sandōgu ("three tools of arresting"), which consisted of the sodegarami, sasumata, and tsukubō. They were symbols of office and were often displayed in front of police checkpoints or used in processions, especially while convicted prisoners were being led to their execution.
- Sodegarami
- Sasumata
- Tsukubo
- Kanamuchi
- Kiriko no bo
- Tetto
- Metsubushi
- Jitte: an iron or wooden club or truncheon, the jitte was a non-lethal weapon and an official symbol of office.
- Te yari (hand spear): a small version of the yari suitable for use in confined spaces.
- Kusari fundo/manriki

== Weapons ==
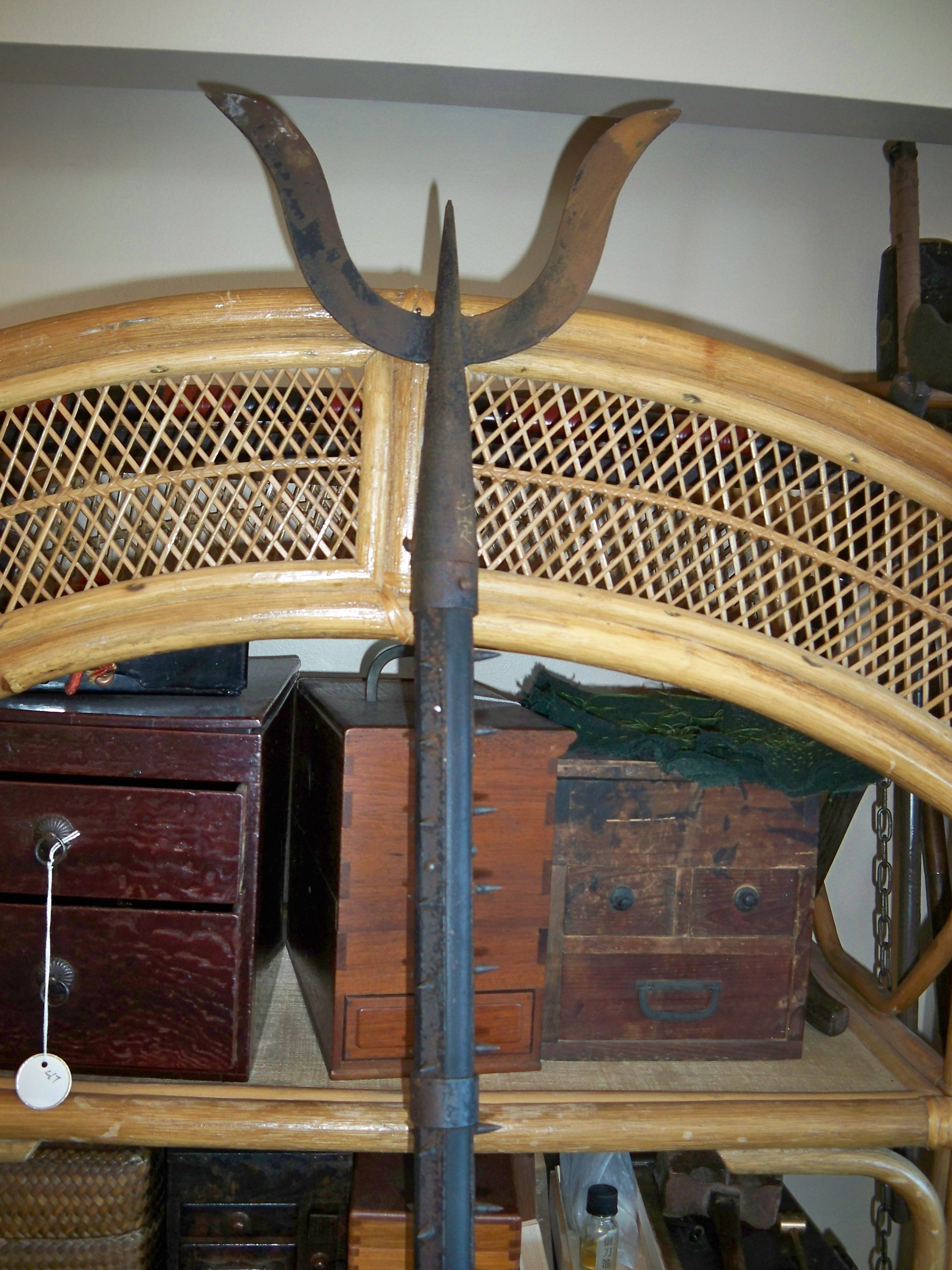
Sasumata

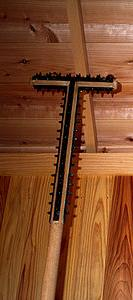
Tsukubo

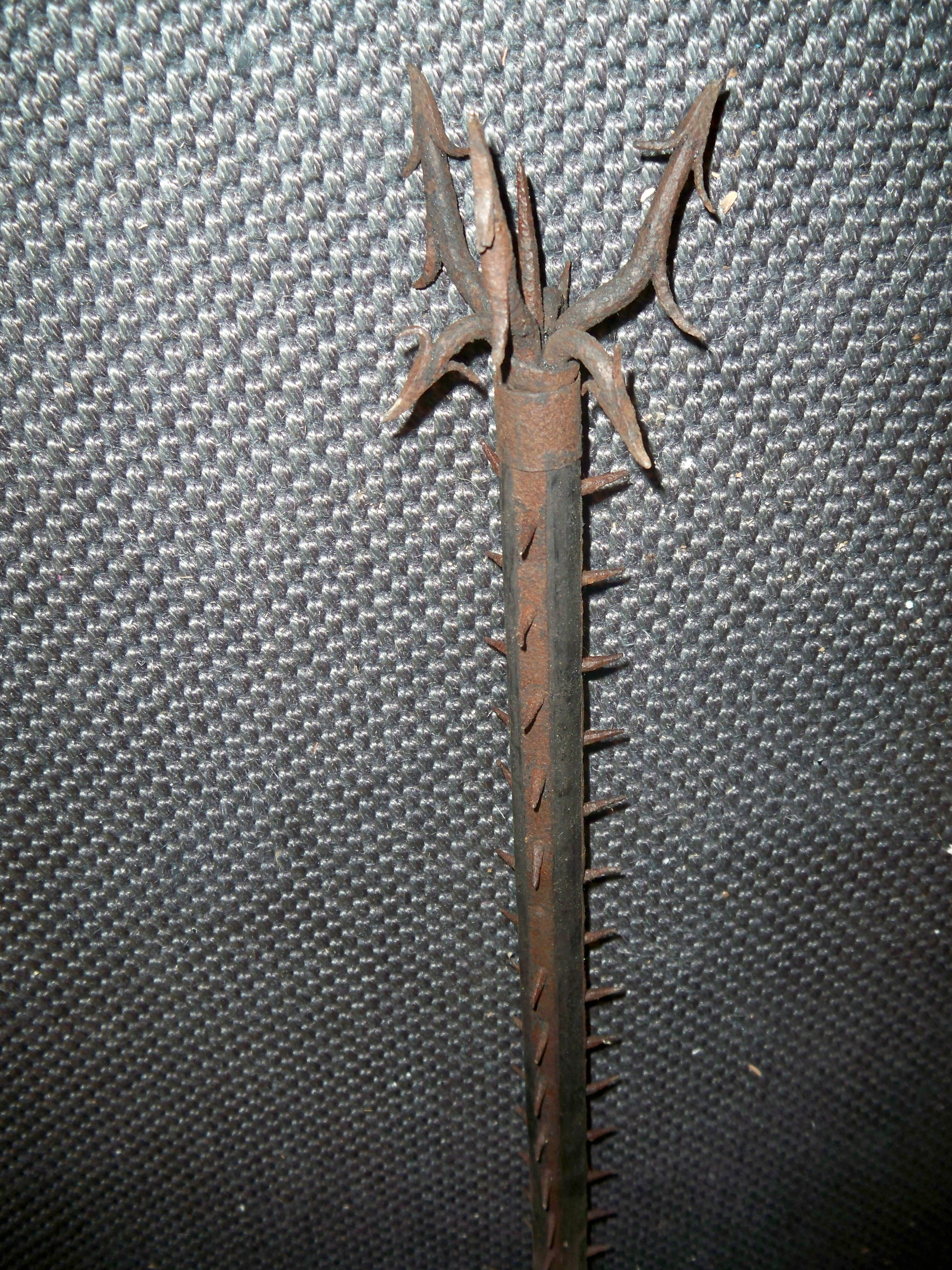
Sodegarami

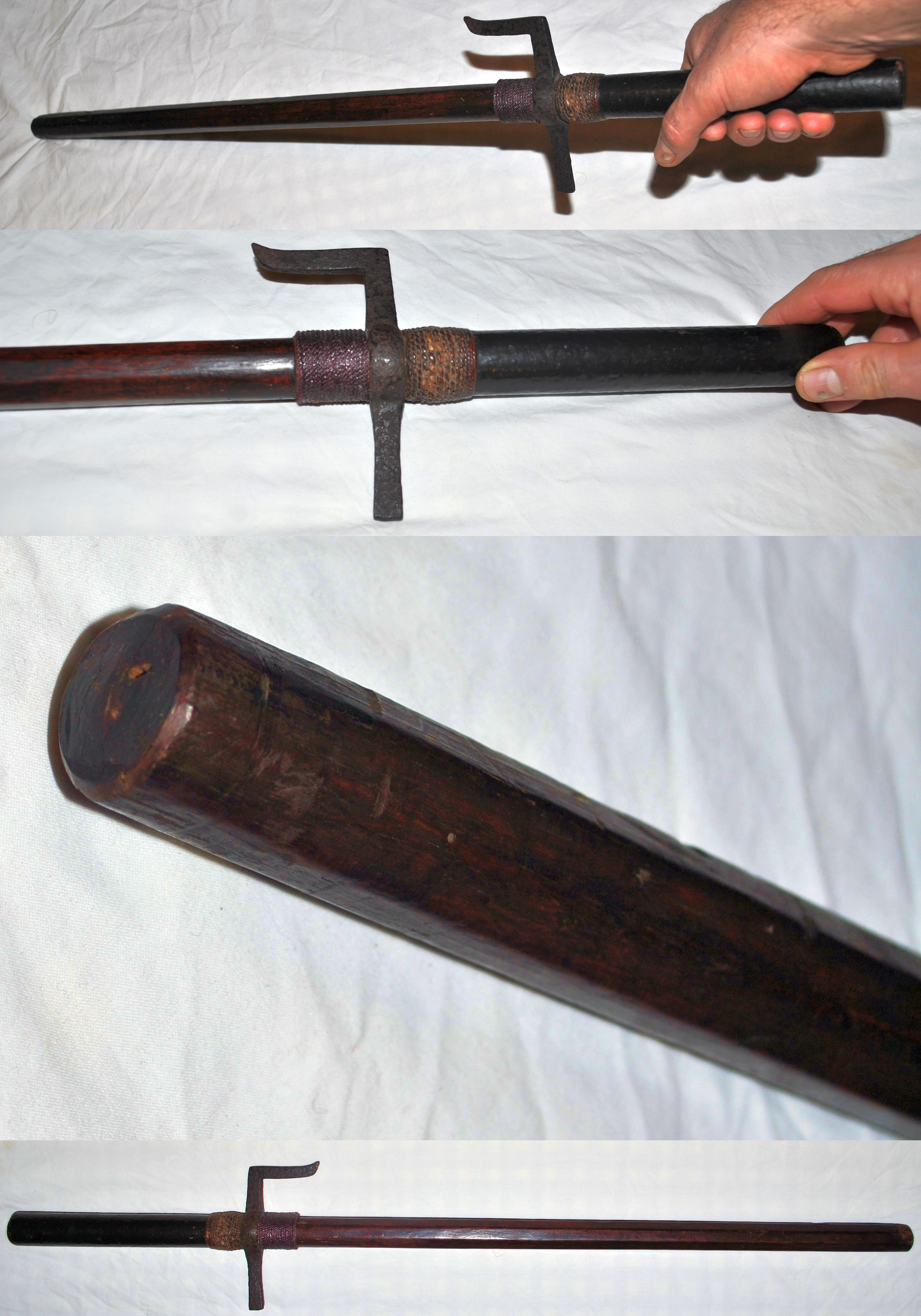
Jitte

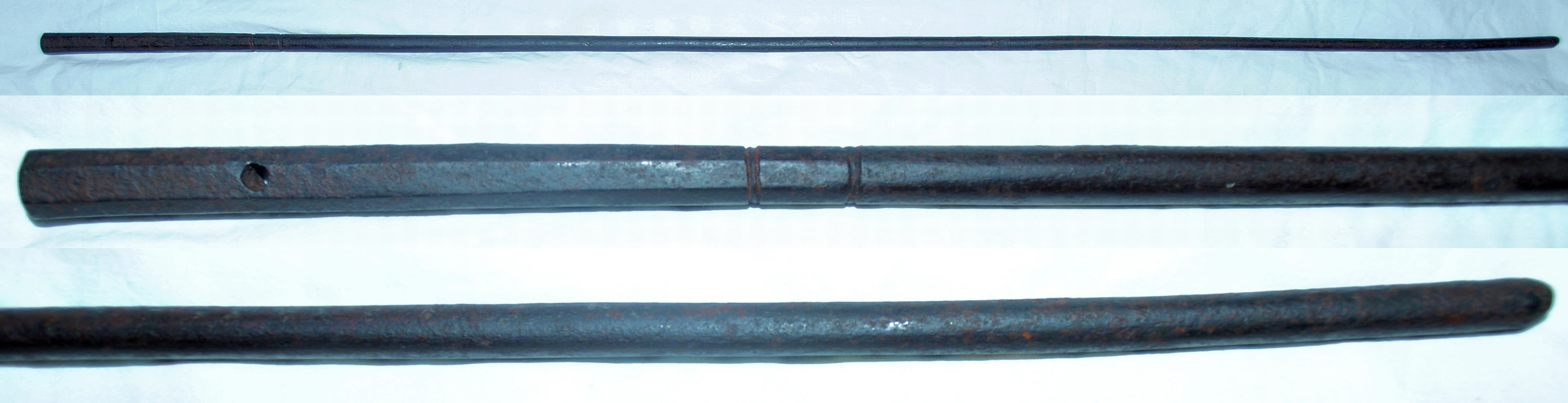
Kanamuchi

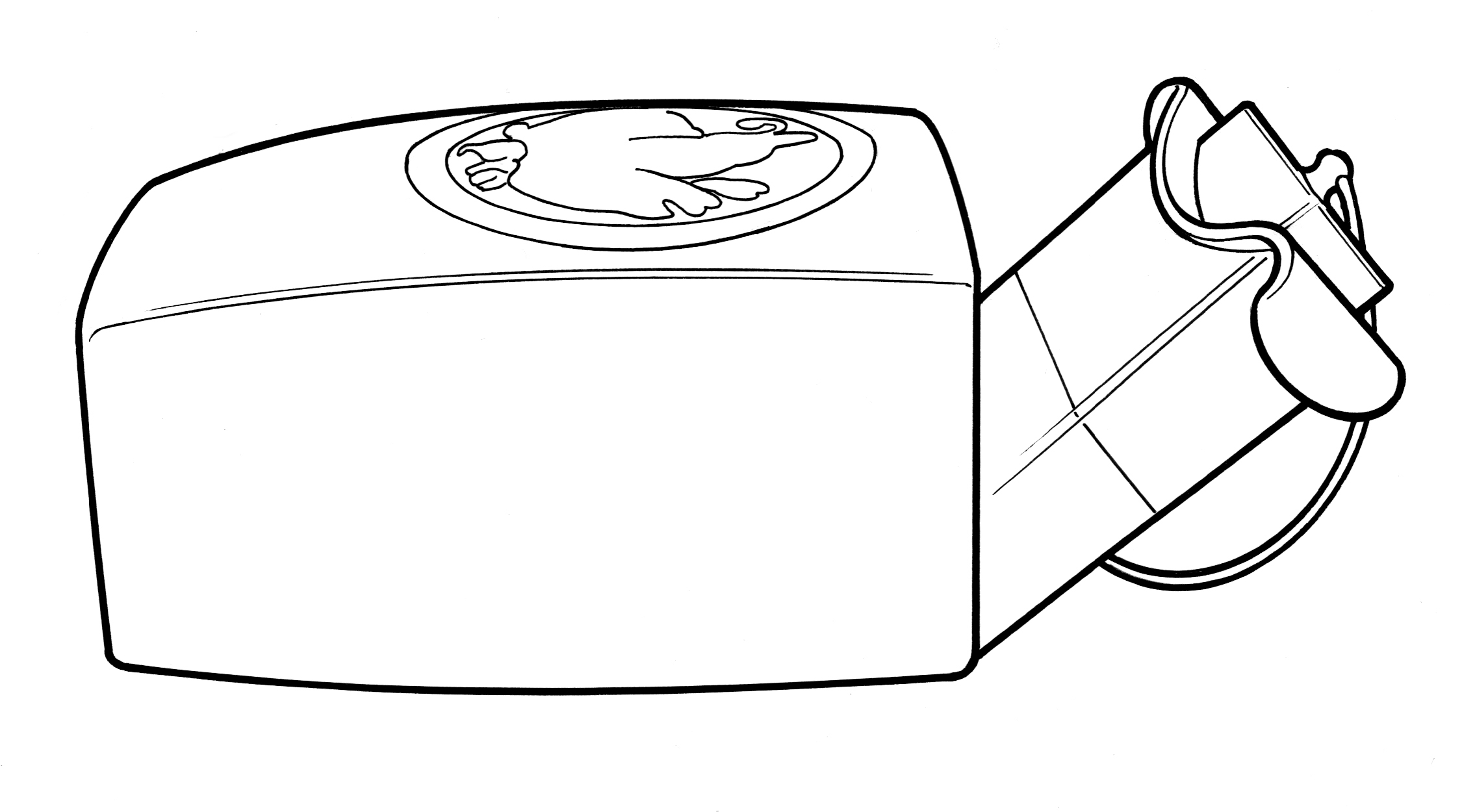
Metsubushi

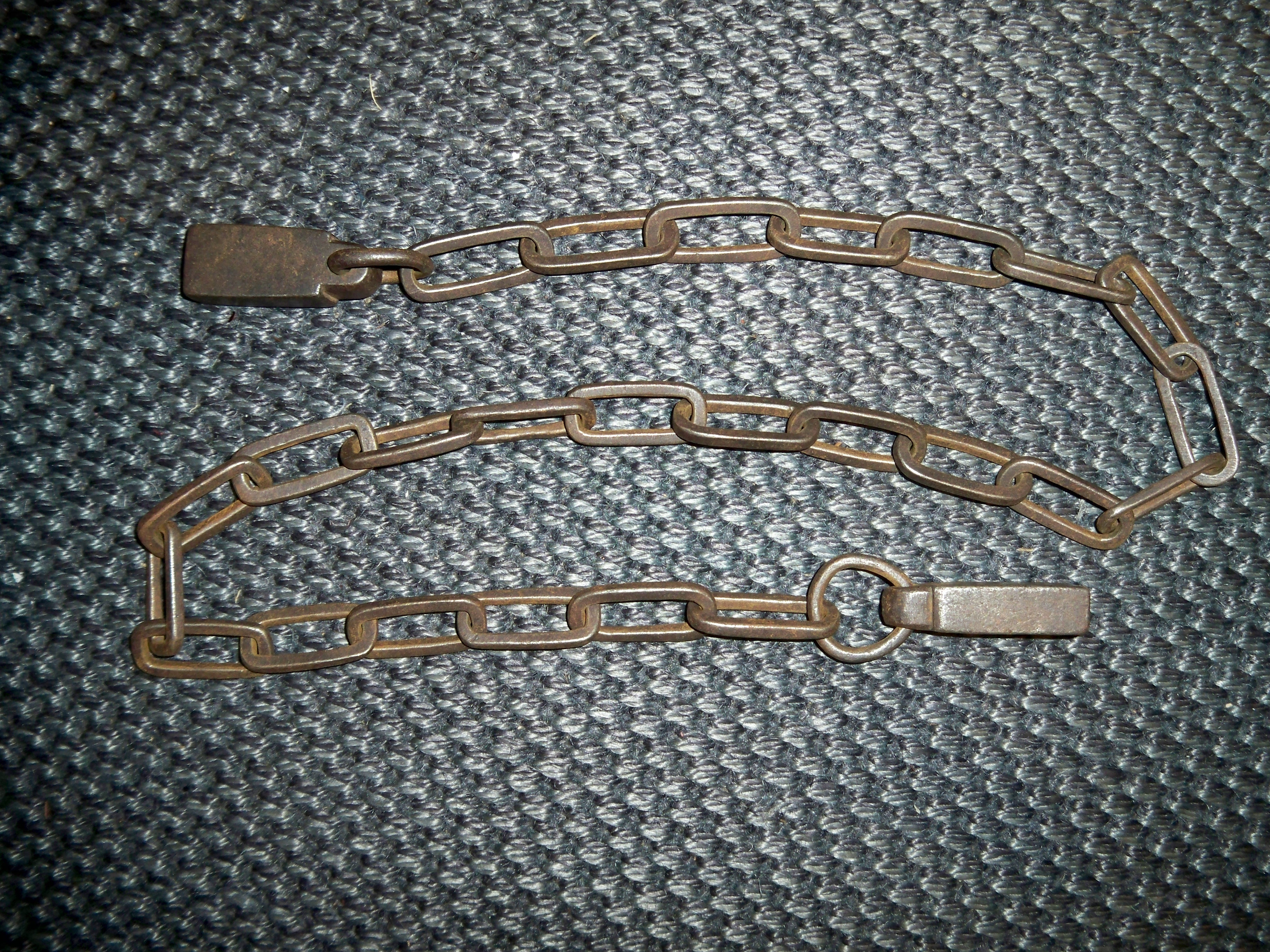
Kusari-fundo/manriki

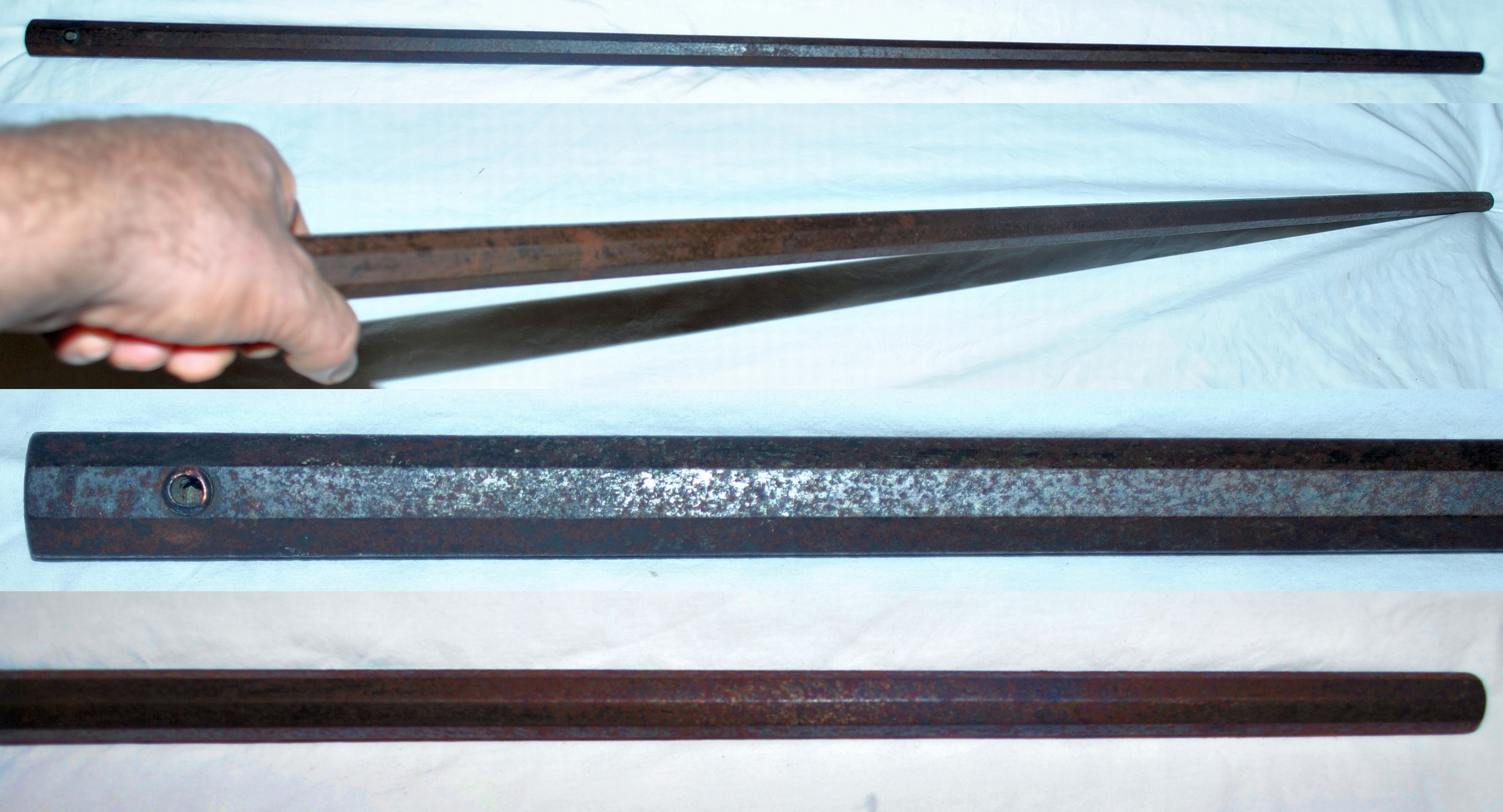
Kriko no bo/aribo

== Armour ==
Edo period police and assistants wore chain armour clothing, armour for the hands, and armour for the head.

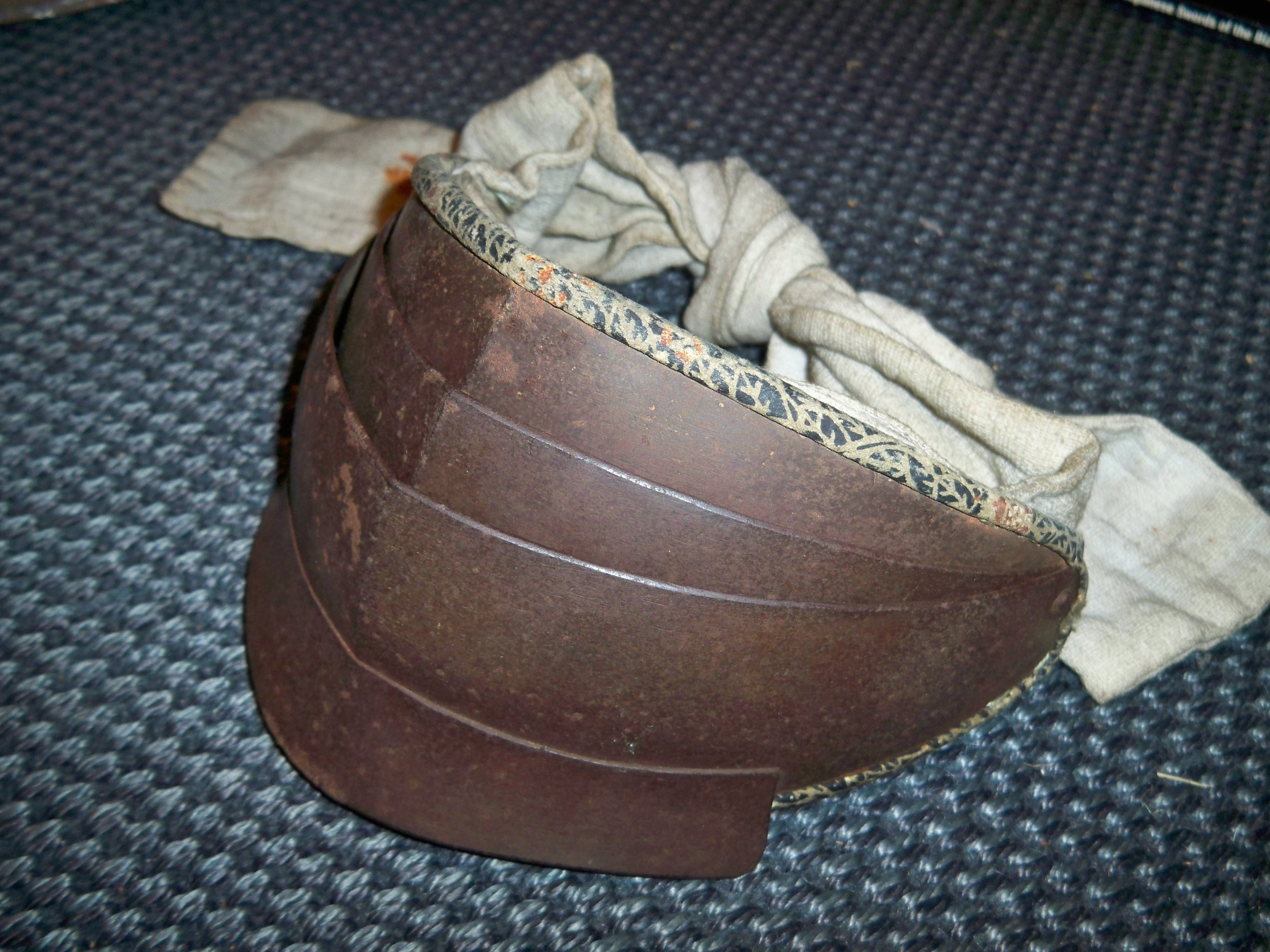
Hachi-gane (forehead protector)

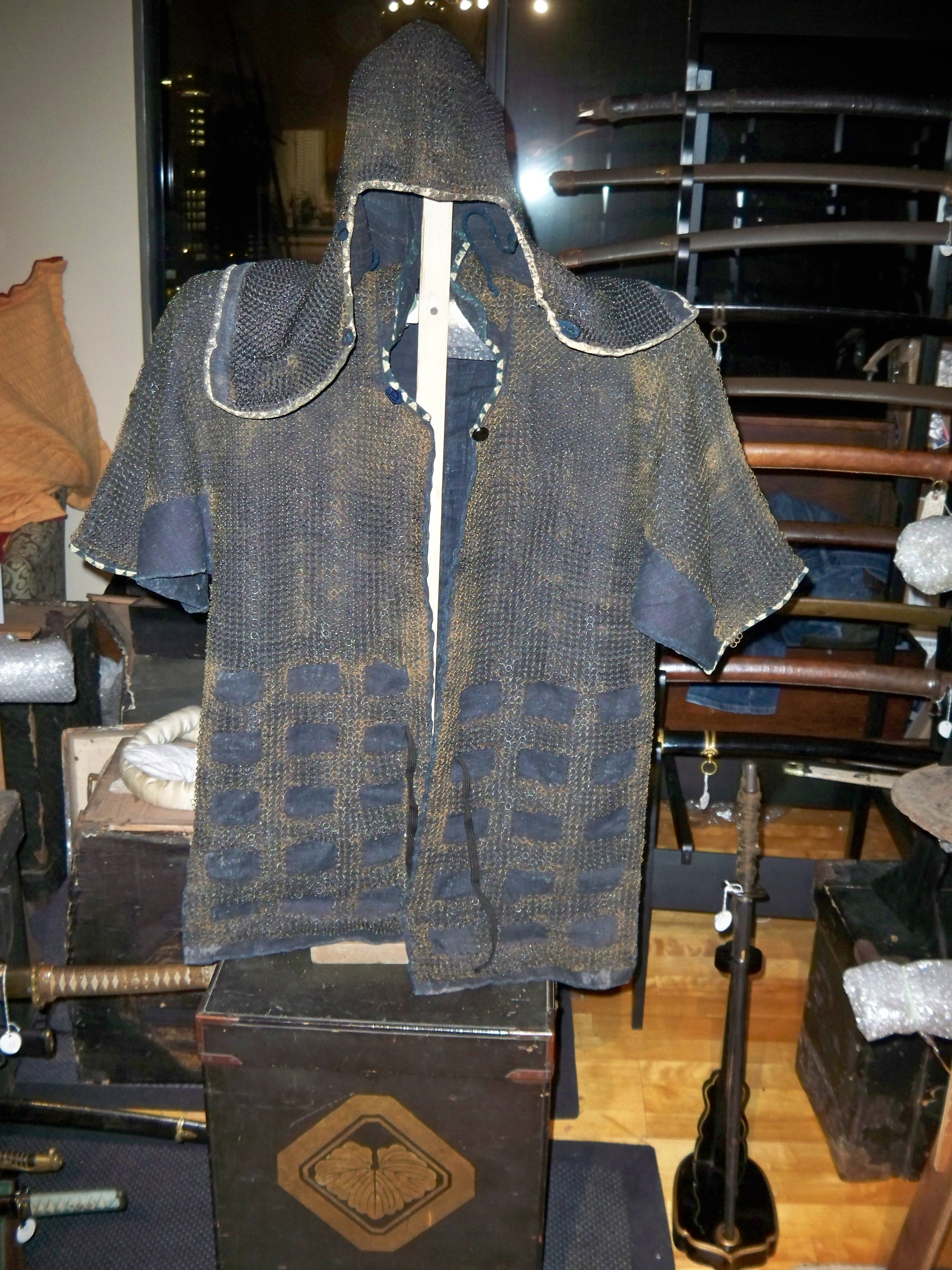
Kusari katabira and kusari zukin (chain armor jacket and hood)

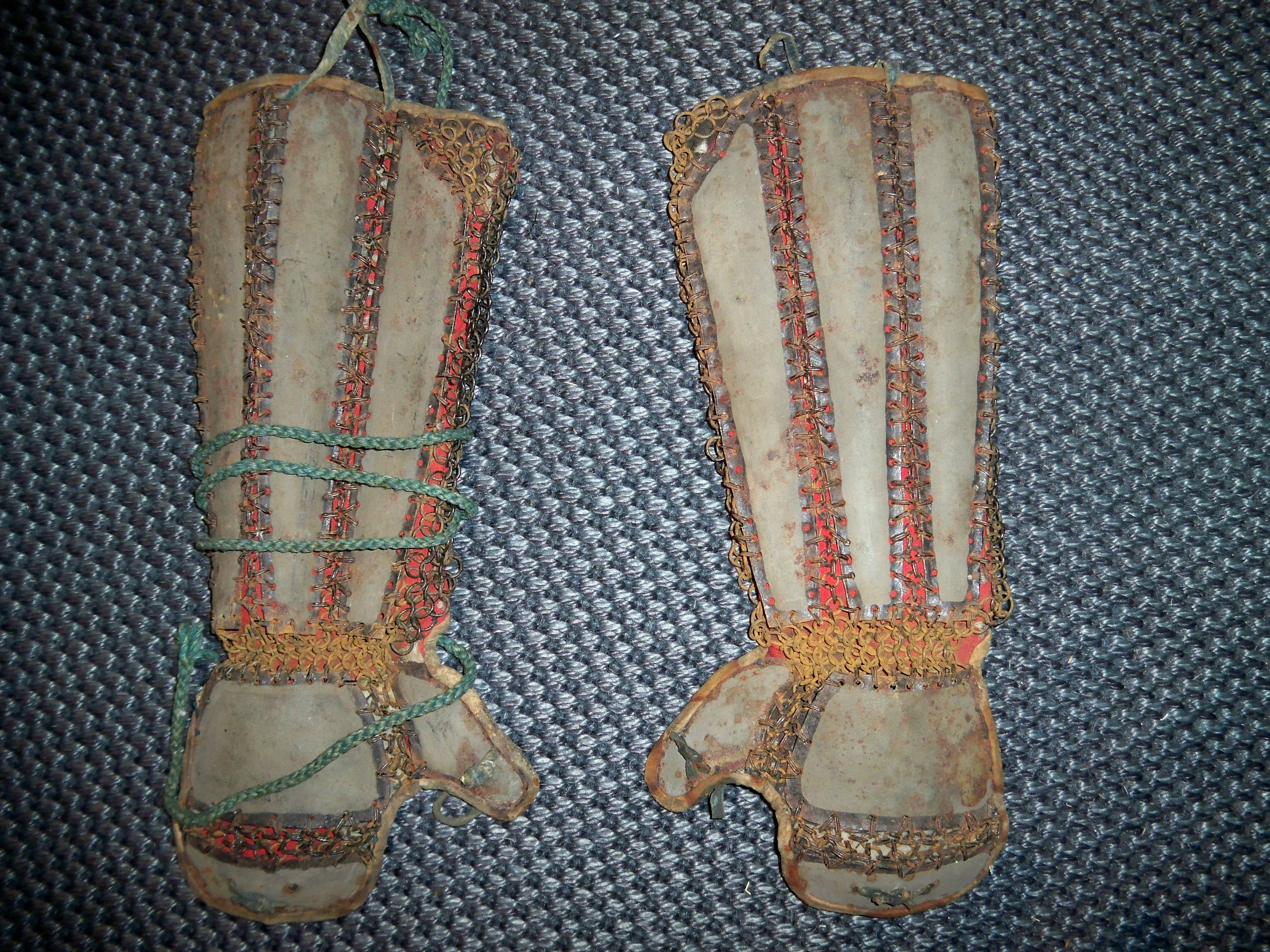
Han kote (gauntlets)

== See also ==
- Criminal punishment in Edo-period Japan
- Jitte
- Law enforcement in Japan
- Shinsengumi
- Torimono sandōgu

== General references ==
- Ames, Walter L. (1981). Police and Community in Japan. University of California Press. ISBN 9780520040700.
- Botsman, Dani (2005). Punishment and Power in the Making of Modern Japan. Princeton University Press. ISBN 9780691114910.
- Brinkley, Frank; Kikuchi, Dairoku (2008) [1915]. A History of the Japanese People from the Earliest Times to the End of the Meiji Era. Encyclopædia Britannica Company. Original edition online.
- Ciba Foundation Symposium (2009). Caste and Race: Comparative Approaches. Volume 973 of Novartis Foundation Symposia. John Wiley & Sons. ISBN 9780470717042.
- Cunningham, Don (2004). Taiho-jutsu: Law and Order in the Age of the Samurai. Tuttle Martial Arts, Tuttle Publishing. pp. 93–100. ISBN 978-0-8048-3536-7.
- Cunningham, Don (2010). "Edo Machi-kata Taiho Jutsu: Armor". e-budokai.com. Archived from the original on 2011-10-04.
- Deal, William E. (2007). Handbook to Life in Medieval and Early Modern Japan. Oxford University Press. ISBN 9780195331264.
- Esselstrom, Erik (2009). Crossing Empire's Edge: Foreign Ministry Police and Japanese Expansionism in Northeast Asia. University of Hawaii Press. ISBN 9780824832315.
- Ikegami, Eiko (2005). Bonds of Civility: Aesthetic Networks and the Political Origins of Japanese Culture: Structural Analysis in the Social Sciences. Cambridge University Press. ISBN 9780521601153.
- Mol, Serge (2003). Classical Weaponry of Japan: Special Weapons and Tactics of the Martial Arts. Kodansha International. ISBN 978-4-7700-2941-6.
- Morrell, Sachiko Kaneko; Morrell, Robert E. (2006). Zen Sanctuary of Purple Robes: Japan's Tōkeiji Convent Since 1285. SUNY Press. ISBN 9780791468272.
- Newman, Jesse C. (2011). The Hated Outsiders: How Manifest Destiny Affected the Japanese and the Jews. AuthorHouse. ISBN 9781463402532.
- Sansom, Sir George Bailey (1963). A History of Japan: 1615–1867. Stanford University Press. ISBN 9780804705264.
- Tabb, William K. (1995). The Postwar Japanese System: Cultural Economy and Economic Transformation. Oxford University Press. ISBN 9780195089509.
- Turnbull, Stephen (2008). The Samurai Swordsman: Master of War. Tuttle Publishing. ISBN 9784805309568.
