= Man catcher =

Type of polearm

Man catcher
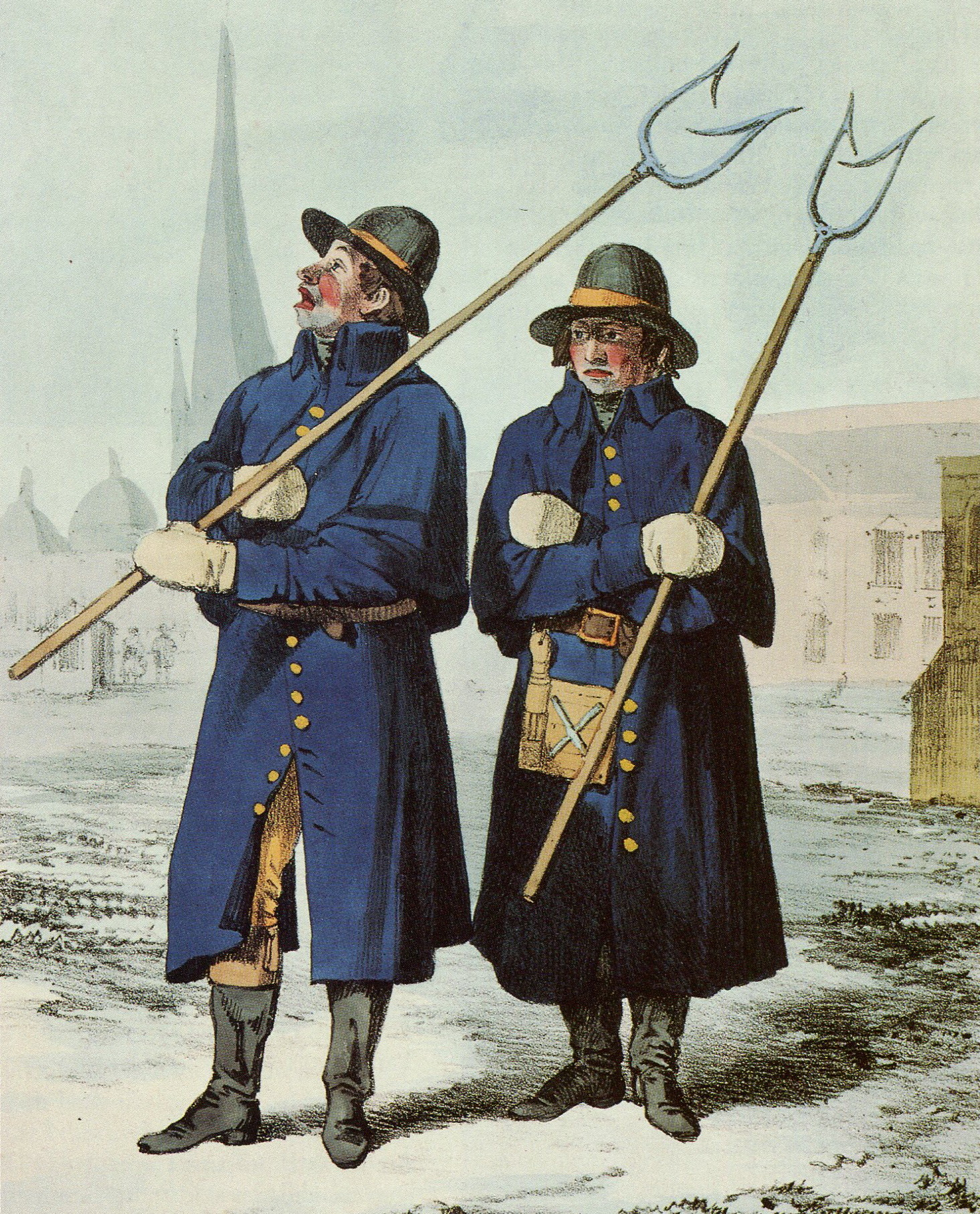
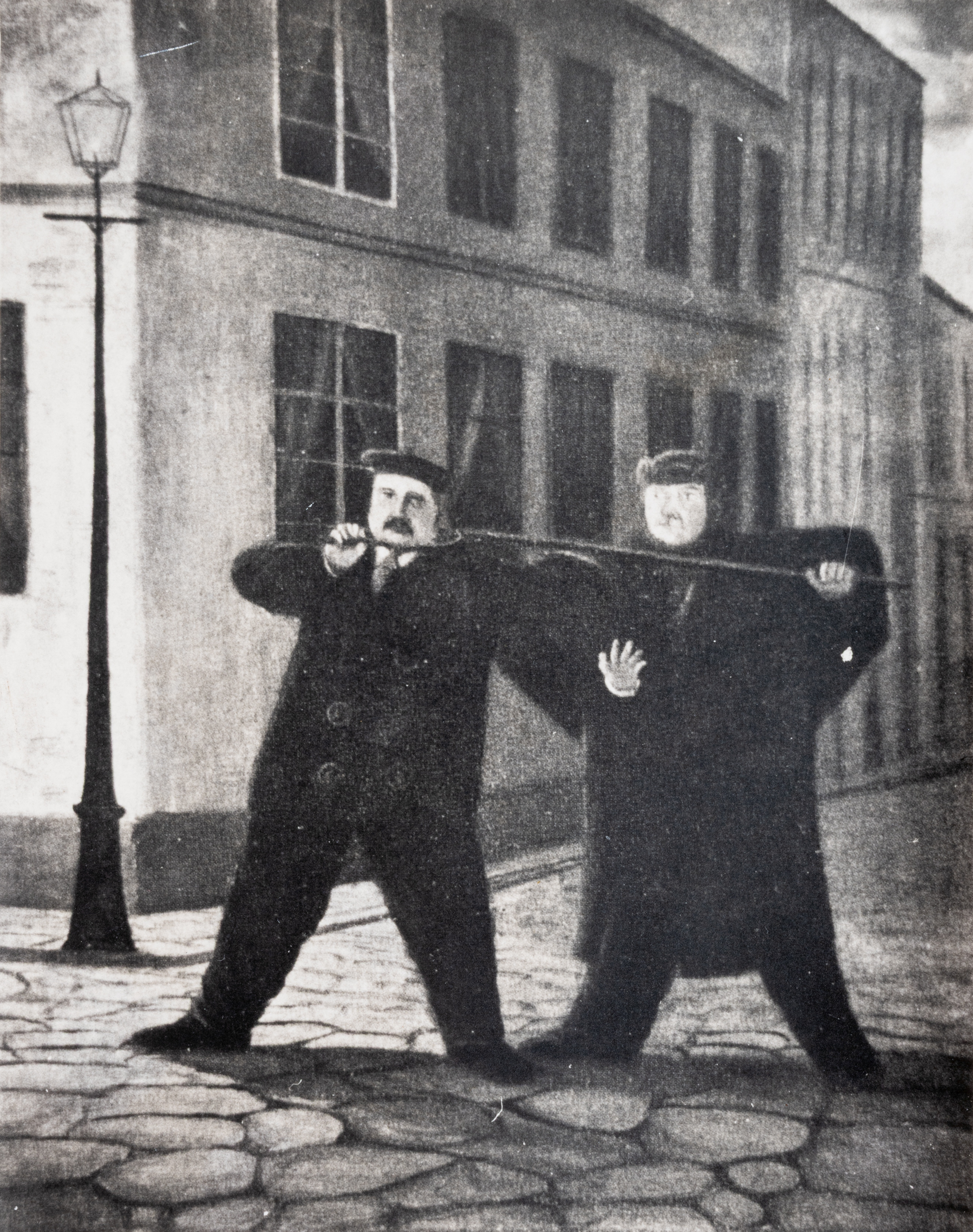
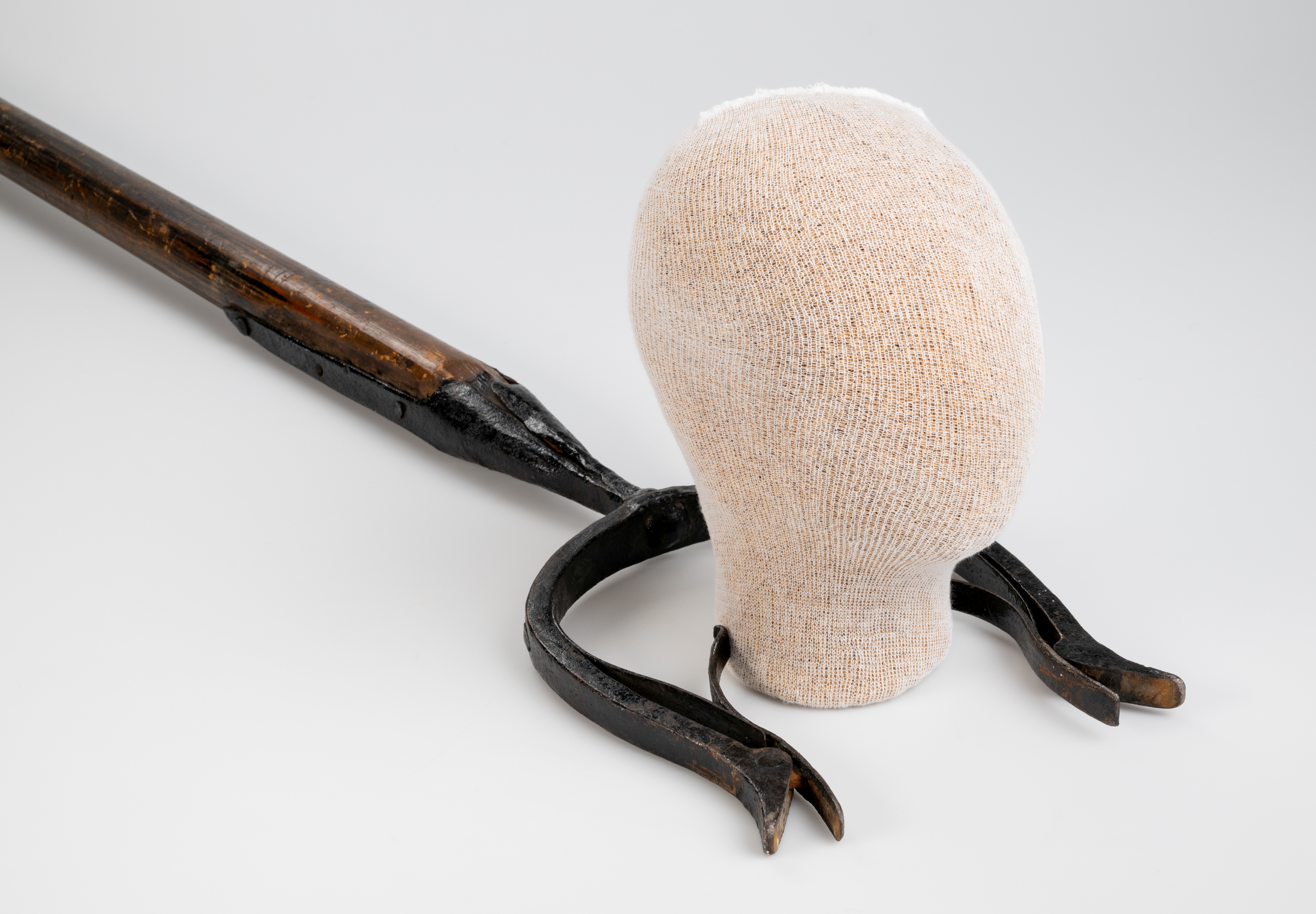
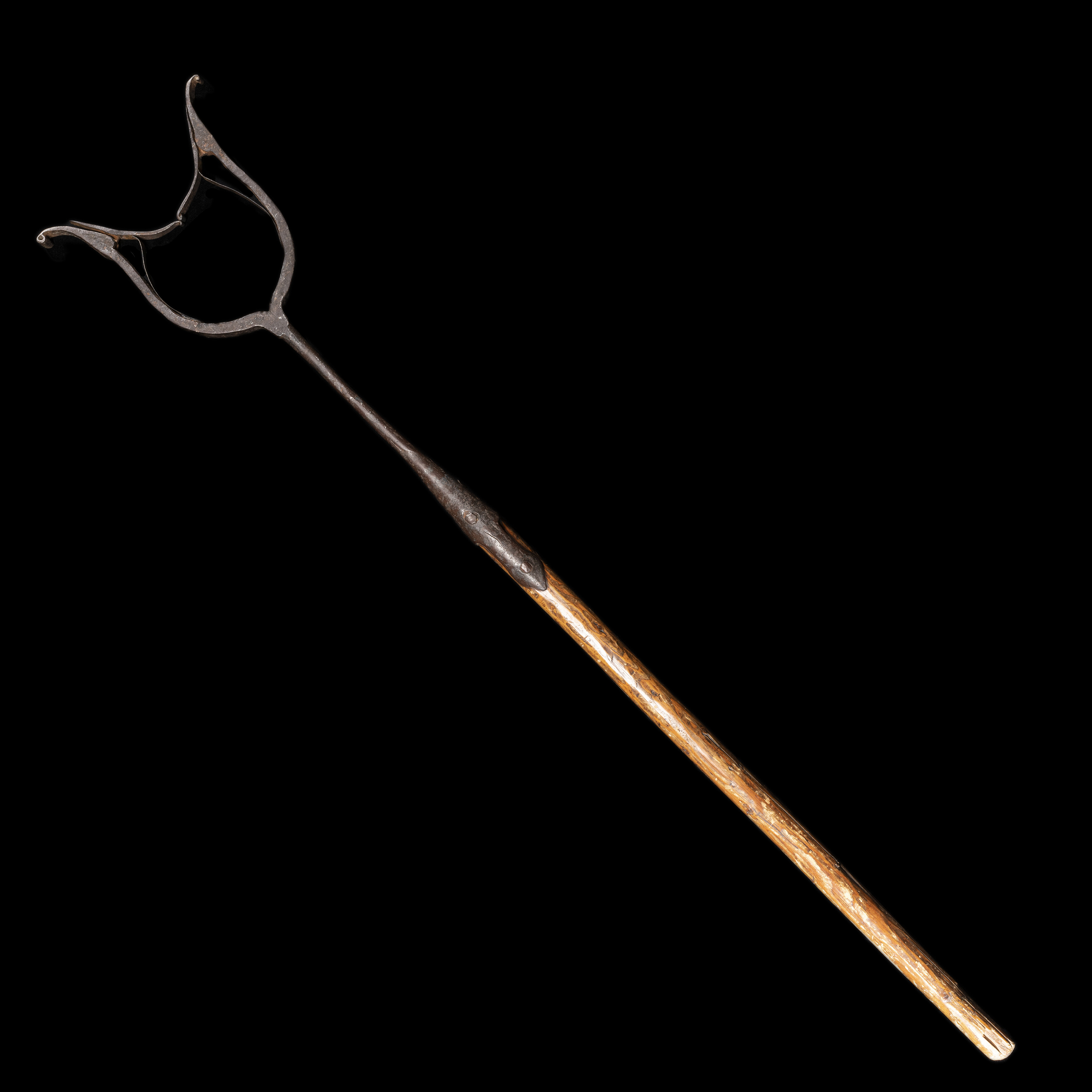
- Top left: Swedish fire-watchmen [Brandvakt] with man catchers, Stockholm, 1822.
- Top right: Nightly troublemaker who has ended up in the night guard's man catcher, 19th century Sweden.
- Bottom left: Demonstration of an early modern Swedish man catcher against a mannequin's head.
- Bottom right: Early modern Swedish man catcher with locking arms.

A man catcher (compare German: Menschenfänger), also known as catchpole, is a capture tool for law enforcement work and similar. It is a form of polearm, consisting of a long shaft equipped with a semicircular arc at one end, intended to be thrust against an opposing individual, with the aim of encircling their waist, limbs, or neck, followed by further thrusts to push the captured person up against a wall or the ground in order to limit and lock their ability to move and escape.

== Etymology ==
The weapon lacks a generic name, instead, more often than not, featuring a descriptive name. Some examples include:

- English: man catcher, catchpole
- French: attrape-coquin ("scoundrel-trap"), attrape-coquin à ressorts ("spring-loaded scoundrel-trap")
- German: Menschenfänger ("man-catcher"), Hexenfänger ("witch-catcher"), or Fangeisen ("trap-iron")
- Japanese: 刺股, sasumata ("thrust-fork")
- Portuguese: desmontador ("dismounter"), derrubador ("overthrower, toppler")
- Swedish: väktarsax ("guard-scissor"), brandvaktsax ("firewatch-scissor"), nattvaktsax ("nightwatch-scissor"), bygel ("bent cross-bar")

== Historical use ==
=== Europe ===
Man catchers were used in Europe during the Late Middle Ages and the Renaissance, with some countries, like Sweden, using it conventionally until the late 19th century. The European design consisted of a pole mounted with a two pronged head. Each prong was semi-circular in shape with a spring-loaded "door" on the front. This created an effective valve that would allow the ring to pass around a man-sized cylinder and keep it trapped.

Man catchers were a sort of policing weapon, and was used to capture people alive by their neck and drag them to the ground where they could be helplessly pinned. Some early designs assumes that the captured person wears armor to protect him against the metal prongs, which could easily hurt the neck of a person without armor. Such could be used to pull a person from horseback. In later periods, man catchers were mainly a weapon against drunkards and other troublemakers. The man catcher was also used to trap and contain violent prisoners.

=== Japan ===
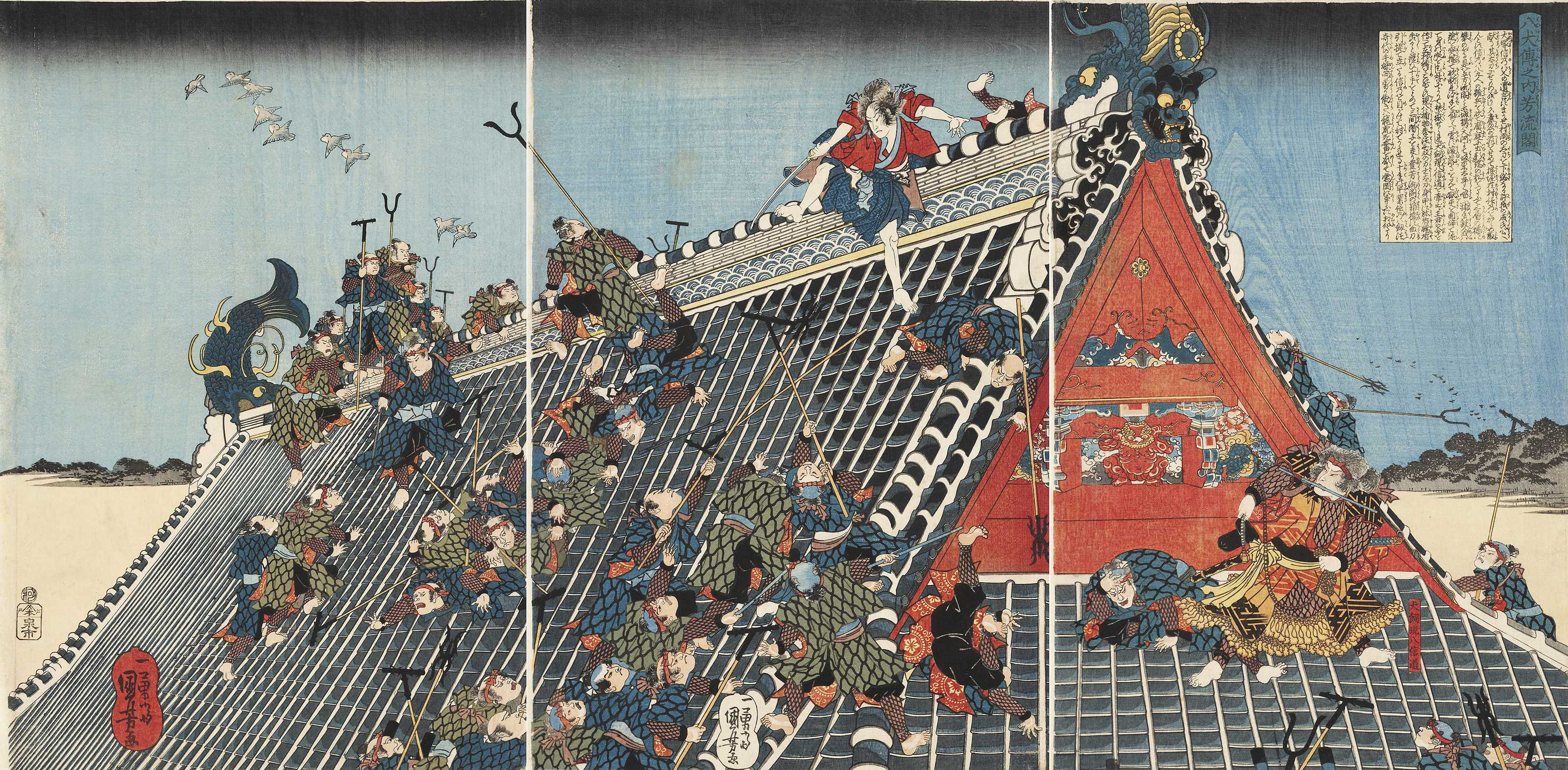
Painting showcasing Japanese medieval law enforcement polearms, such as the sodegarami, tsukubō, and sasumata

Similarly, the Japanese sasumata, as well as the sodegarami and tsukubō, were used by Edo-era law enforcement for apprehending suspects. However, the sasumata was most like a man catcher in usage, as its forked head was designed to pin the suspect's neck, legs, arms, or joints against a wall or the ground.

=== Gallery ===
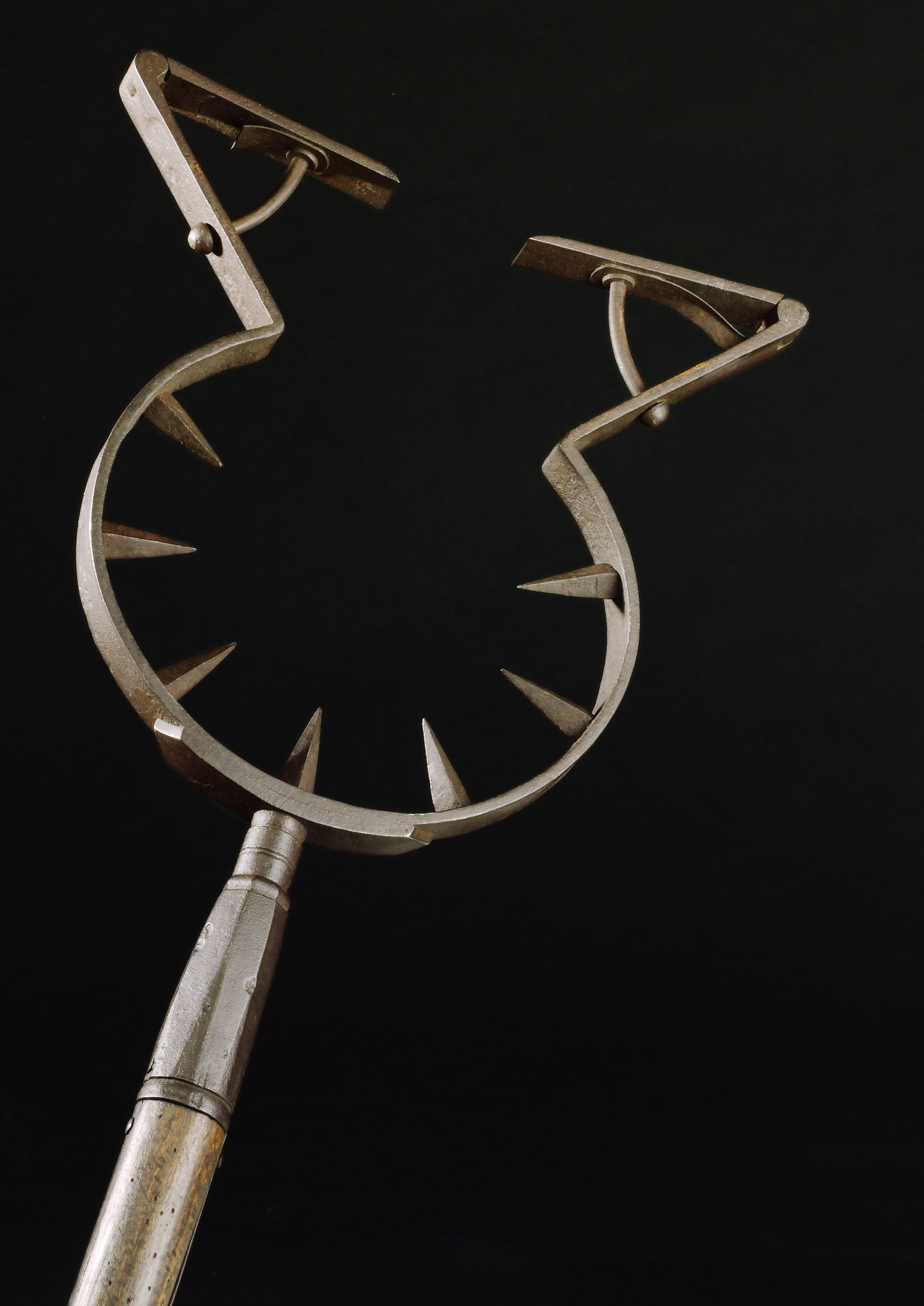
Early modern German man catcher with locking arms and inward facing spikes

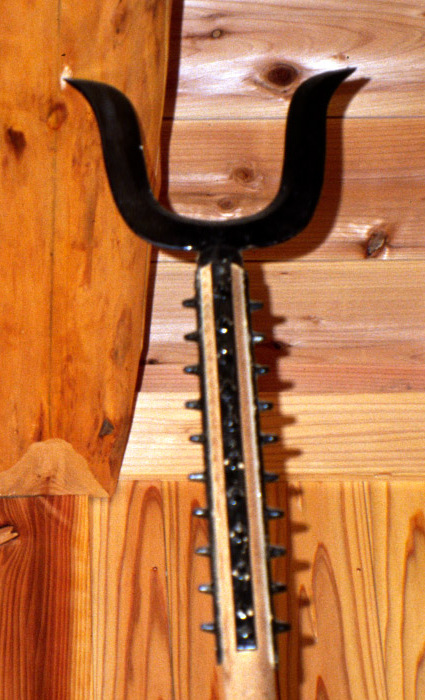
Medieval Japanese sasumata man catcher with shaft thorns against counter grips

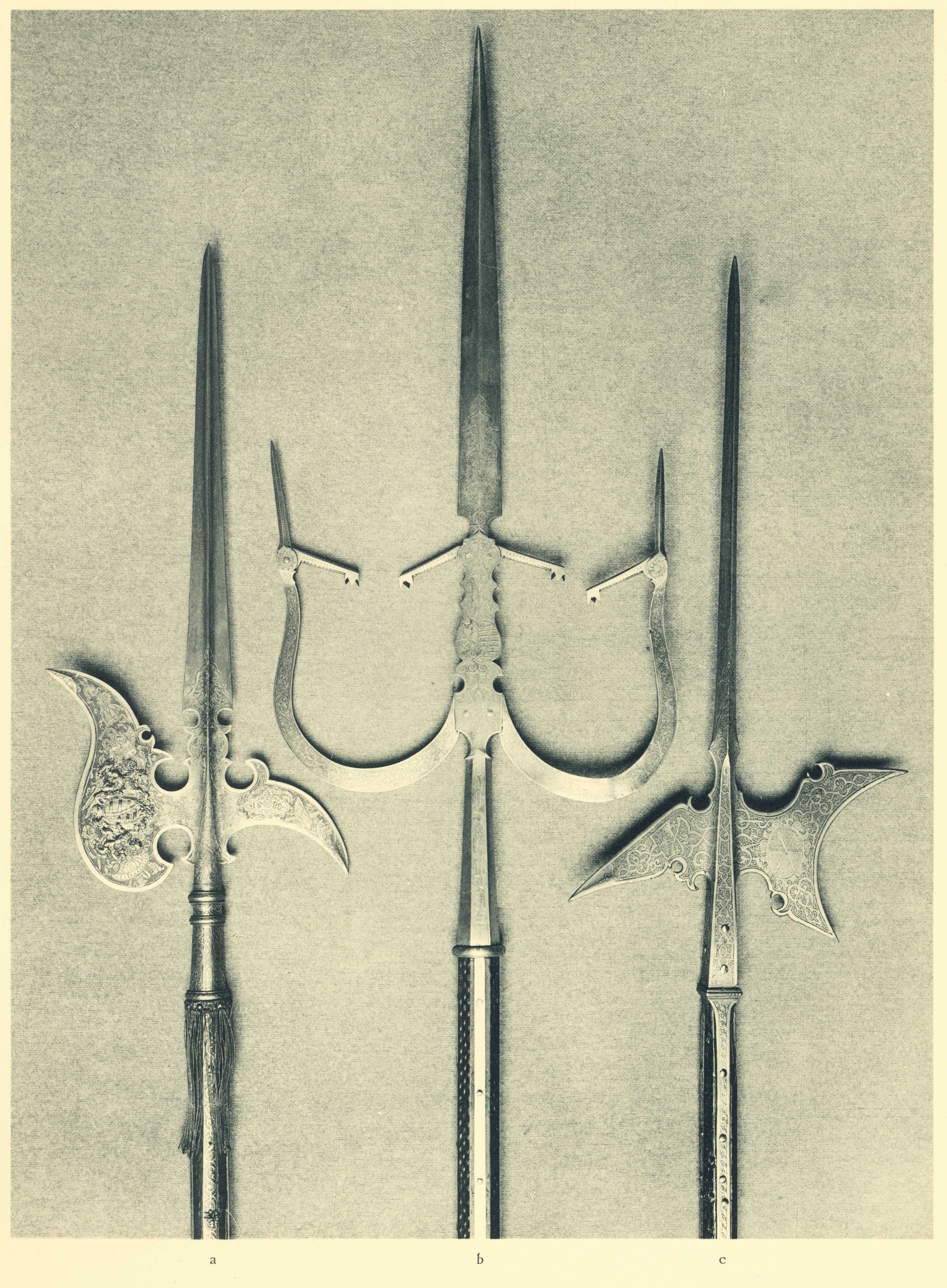
Man catcher spear with a blade and twin catching arms

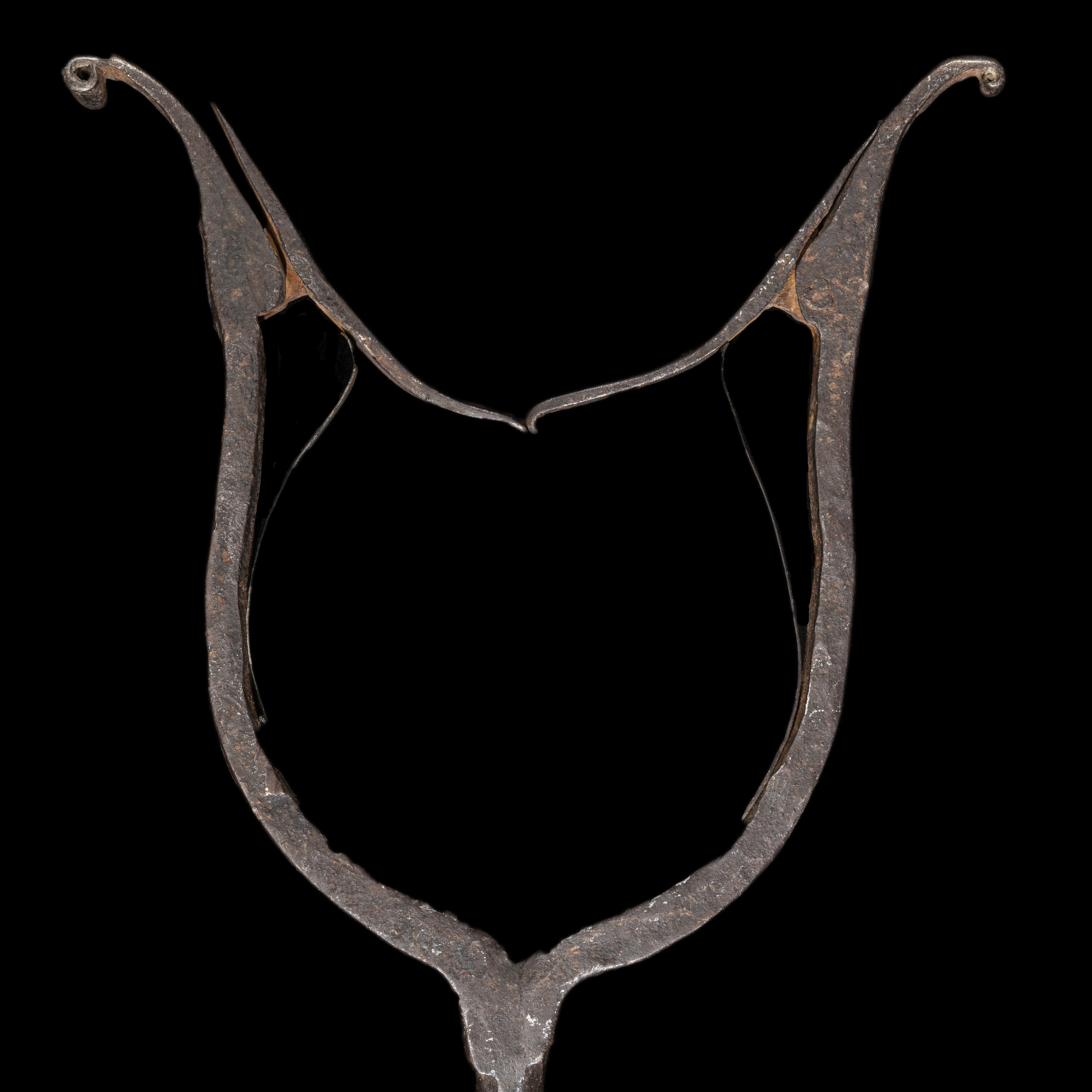
Close-up of the head to a Swedish man catcher

== Modern use ==
Modern mancatchers are often used with shields by police and security guards to isolate and restrain individuals while protecting themselves.

=== China ===
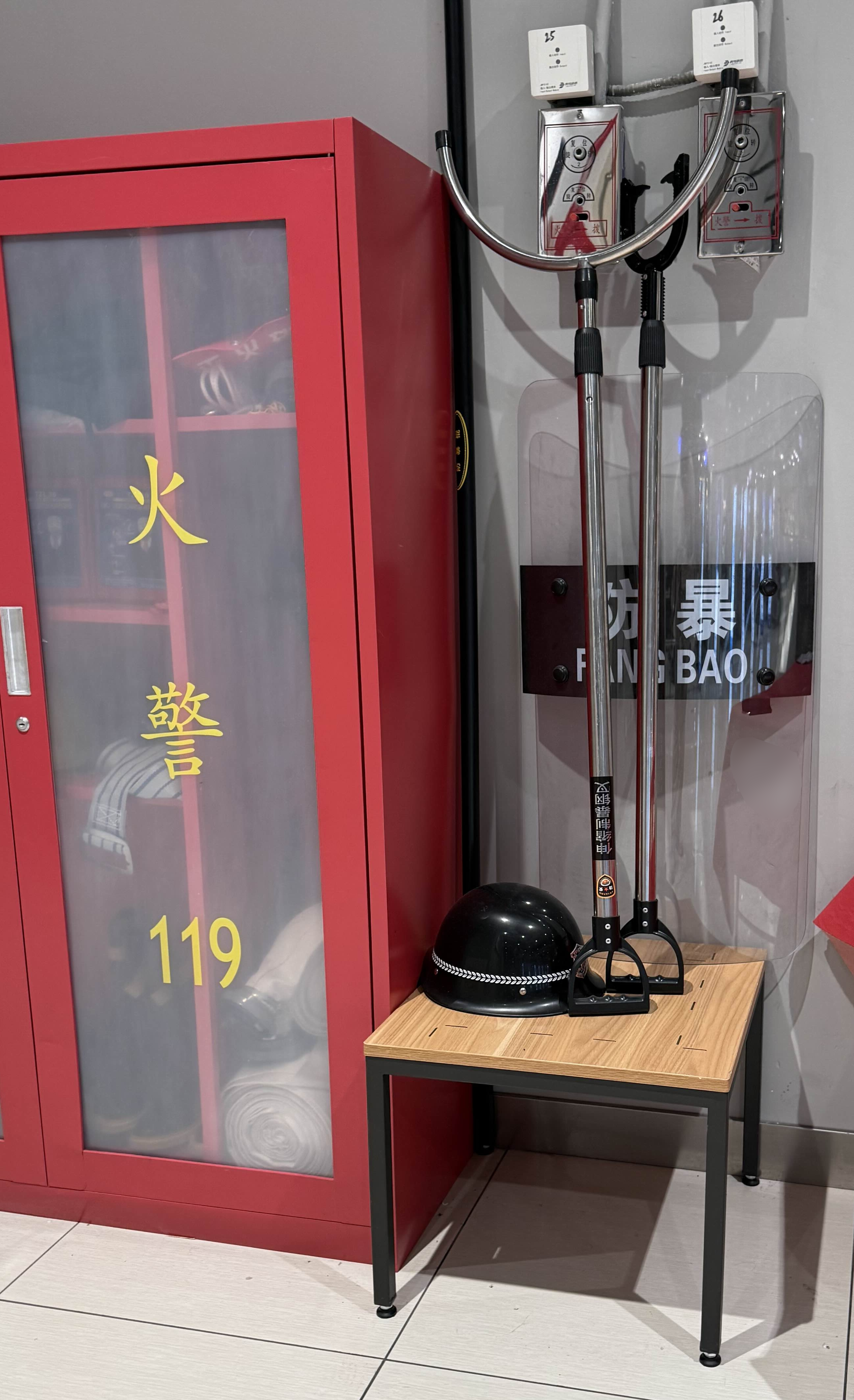
Set of modern mancatchers used by security guards in China found inside a supermarket

A type of locking man catcher is available for staff at train stations, supermarkets, and airports in China to capture and restrain individuals in a non-lethal manner.

Some mancatchers may be designed with sharp prongs to discourage a restrained person from grabbing the polearm.

In some junior and middle schools, security guards are equipped with non-locking variants designed to seize a person's waist or prevent them from advancing. It is essentially a two-pronged fork, a U-shape projecting from a pole.

=== Japan ===
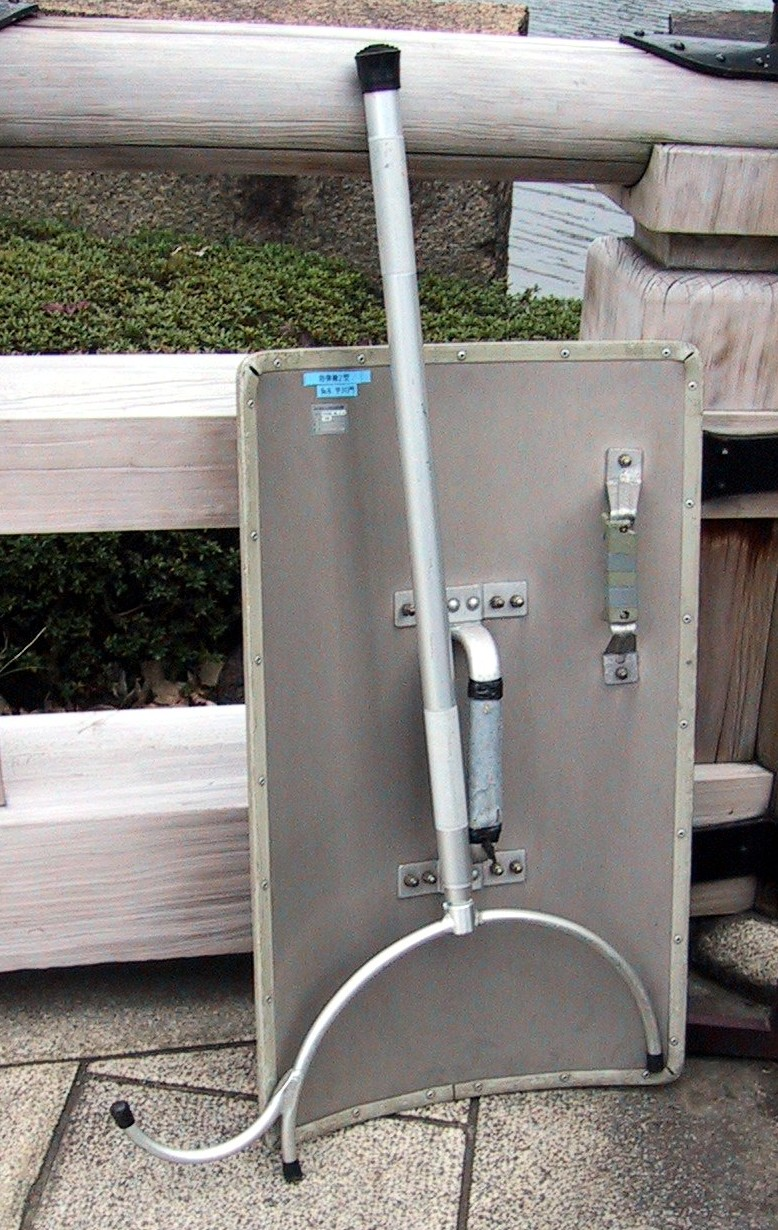
Modern sasumata man catcher used by riot police in Japan

While man catchers are no longer in western use, the Japanese police (and thereof) retain modern variants of the sasumata, that are semi-flexible, with padding, blunt endpoints, and other slightly modified geometry, designed to significantly reduce the chance of injury to restrained civilians. These variants are designed for use by non-soldiers—specifically, they are intended for use by a Japanese riot police mounted on horseback. In such a case, the mounted riot police would typically be arranged in formation line abreast, and would use a row of raised sasumata to hold back large crowds. These mounted riot police answer to the Japanese National Police Agency. Since the outbreak of serious riots is uncommon in Japan, the modern sasumata is rarely used. Nevertheless, the necessary training is kept up to date.

=== India and Nepal ===
During the COVID-19 pandemic in India, police in Chandigarh implemented a mechanical device resembling a man catcher in order to capture suspects while maintaining a safe social distance. It was created to be used on a person's waistline. They called it a "social distancing clamp" or a "lockdown-breaker catcher". It was based on an idea from police in Nepal, where officers have reportedly detained over 1,400 suspects using a similar "multifunctional arrest device". Mancatchers were also used for other purposes such as pulling dead bodies out of the water. The main difference between the designs is that those used in India expand the size of the clamp depending on the person's waistline.

== See also ==
- Monk's spade, one end has similar function but for animals
