= Yueya chan =

Chinese polearm and shovel

Yueya chan

A yueya chan (simplified Chinese: 月牙铲; traditional Chinese: 月牙鏟; pinyin: yuèyáchǎn; lit. 'Crescent Moon Spade'; also, traditional Chinese: 禪仗; simplified Chinese: 禅仗; pinyin: chánzhàng; Japanese: getsugasan; lit. 'Chan Staff'), also called a Shaolin spade or a monk's spade, is a Chinese polearm consisting of a long pole with a flat spade-like blade on one end and a smaller crescent shaped blade on the other. Neither blade was designed to be sharpened. In old China, Buddhist monks often carried spades (shovels) with them when travelling. This served two purposes: if they came upon a corpse on the road, they could properly bury it with Buddhist rites, and the large implement could serve as a weapon for defence against bandits. The crescent was designed as defense against small to medium-sized predators such as wild dogs and leopards. The way it is used is to hold the animal at bay by positioning the crescent at the animal's neck and pushing it away if needed. Over time, they were stylised into the yueya chan weapon.

== See also ==
- Khakkhara
- Sasumata
