= Sasumata =

Japanese polearm

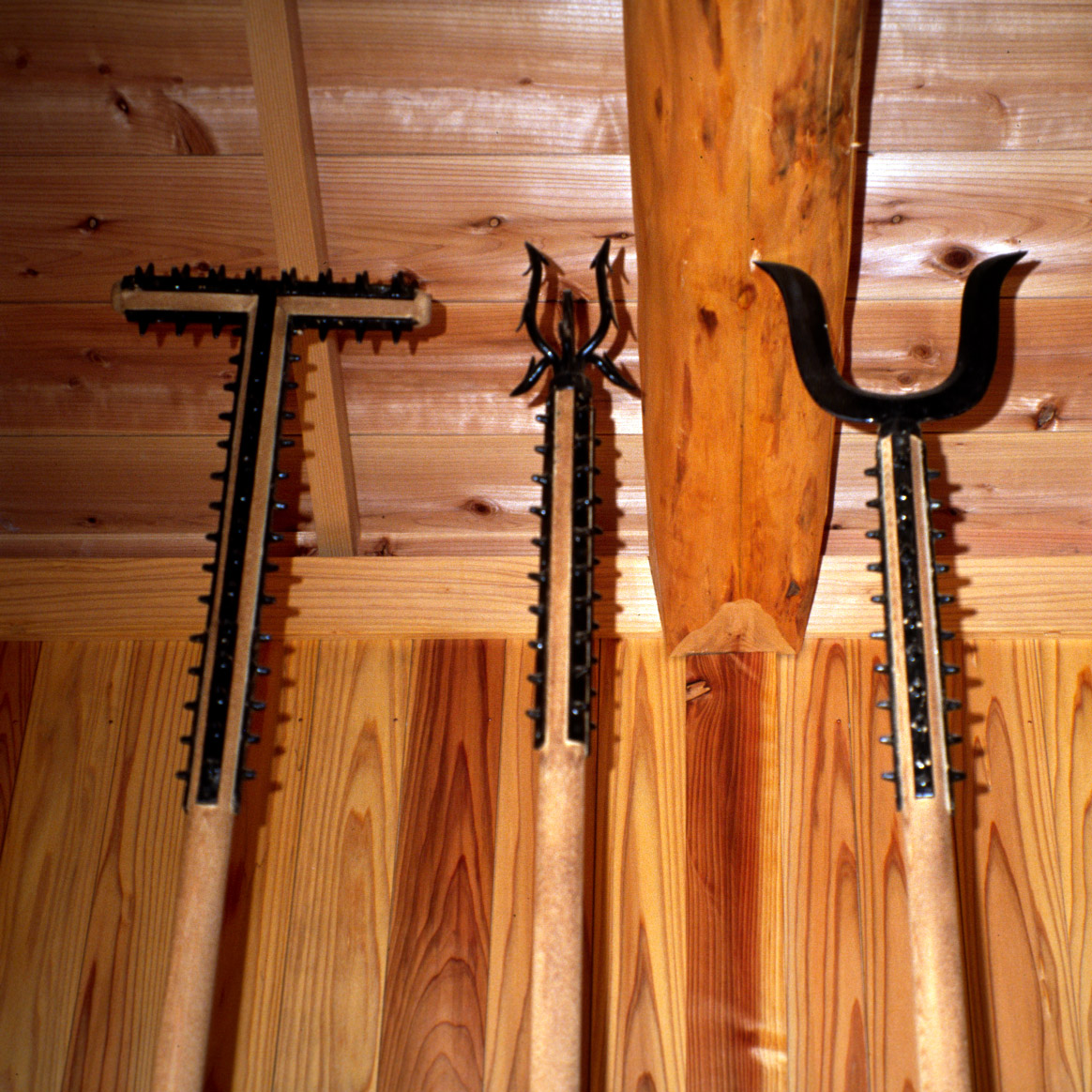
Weapons for capturing suspected criminals, from left to right: a tsukubō, a sodegarami, and a sasumata

The sasumata (刺股; spear fork) is a polearm, a "man catcher", used by the samurai class and their retainers in feudal Japan.

== Etymology ==
The term sasumata combines the Japanese words 刺 (sasu, "to stab" or "to thrust") and 股 (mata, "fork" or "crotch"), literally meaning "thrusting fork." The name highlights its dual nature: a polearm-like implement but primarily designed to restrain or pin a suspect against the ground or wall.

== Historical background ==
=== Early development ===
Although the exact origin of the sasumata is uncertain, it is believed to have developed from agricultural tools and battlefield implements during the late Muromachi period (1336–1573). Its design was influenced by earlier polearms and anti-cavalry devices but adapted for urban policing during the peaceful Edo period.

=== Edo-period policing ===
During the Tokugawa shogunate, policing responsibilities were entrusted to samurai retainers, low-ranking officials, and specialized officers. The state discouraged unnecessary bloodshed, especially in densely populated urban centers such as Edo (Tokyo), Osaka, and Kyoto. To enforce order, law enforcement relied on tools that allowed suspects to be subdued without lethal force.

The sasumata, tsukubō, and sodegarami became standardized equipment for police outposts (bansho), checkpoints, and magistrates’ offices. These tools were collectively called the torimono sandōgu and were part of a broader system of six implements known as the bansho rokugin (the "six implements of a guardhouse").

== Description and design ==
A traditional sasumata was approximately 2 meters (6.5 feet) in length, with a wooden shaft reinforced by iron fittings. The working end consisted of a large, U-shaped fork, often equipped with inward-facing barbs or spikes. These prevented suspects from grabbing the pole and added psychological deterrence. The opposite end was capped with an ishizuki (butt cap), a metal fitting commonly found on other Japanese polearms, both for protection and balance.

== Techniques of use ==
=== Taiho-jutsu ===
The use of the sasumata was integrated into a broader system of arresting techniques known as taiho-jutsu ("arresting arts"). Officers trained to immobilize suspects with minimal harm, then secure them using rope-tying methods from hojōjutsu.

=== Arrest scenarios ===
Because Edo-period law demanded suspects be brought in alive whenever possible, the sasumata epitomized non-lethal but coercive policing.

== Decline and survival ==
With the Meiji Restoration (1868) and modernization of police forces along Western lines, the torimono sandōgu, including the sasumata, declined in regular law enforcement use. Firearms, batons, and handcuffs became standard. Nevertheless, the sasumata survived as a cultural artifact and training tool in some martial arts schools specializing in traditional arresting techniques.

== Modern usage ==
=== School security ===
In the aftermath of the 2001 Ikeda Elementary School massacre in Osaka, many Japanese schools sought practical, non-lethal means of defense against intruders. Modern sasumata, typically made of aluminum and designed with padded, blunt forks, were introduced into classrooms as emergency restraint tools.

=== Police and civilian contexts ===
While not part of standard police issue nationwide, some Japanese police departments retain modern sasumata for riot control or special scenarios. Businesses, such as convenience stores and jewelry shops, also stock them for self-defense against robbers. A widely publicized 2023 incident in Tokyo involved a jewelry store employee fending off would-be robbers with a sasumata, sparking renewed interest and sales.

=== Training and challenges ===
Critics point out that effective use of sasumata requires training to avoid accidental harm. Without proper instruction, users may fail to immobilize suspects safely. There are also debates about liability in cases where injury occurs during civilian use.

== Comparisons with other tools ==
The sasumata shares similarities with other cultural restraint devices:

- The European man catcher featured a similar forked design intended to pull riders off horses or restrain suspects.
- Chinese military history includes polearms with crescent or forked heads used to control enemies at a distance.
- Within Japan, the sasumata was functionally paired with the tsukubō (push pole) and sodegarami (sleeve entangler), together forming the essential set of torimono sandōgu.

== Criticism and concerns ==
- Training burden: Proper restraint techniques must be taught; otherwise, the tool could become ineffective or dangerous.

== In martial arts ==
The sasumata is preserved in certain martial traditions, particularly within taiho-jutsu and koryū schools that emphasize Edo-period arresting techniques. Martial arts demonstrations often include mock scenarios of subduing an armed opponent with sasumata, showcasing both its practical heritage and symbolic role.

== Legacy ==
Today, the sasumata represents both a historical artifact of Tokugawa policing and a modern example of how historical tools are repurposed for contemporary safety concerns. Its enduring presence in Japanese schools, museums, and martial arts halls only underscores the continuity between past and present approaches to law enforcement and self-defense.

== Description and use ==
The sasumata (spear fork) together with the tsukubō (push pole) and the sodegarami (sleeve entangler) comprised the torimono sandōgu (three tools/implements of arresting) used by samurai police and security forces. Samurai police in the Edo period used the sasumata along with the sodegarami and tsukubō to restrain and arrest suspected criminals uninjured. The head of the sasumata would be used to catch around the neck, arms, legs, or joints of a suspect and detain them until officers could close in and apprehend them (using hojōjutsu). The sasumata had a long hardwood pole usually around 2 m (6 ft 7 in) in length with sharp barbs or spines attached to metal strips on one end of the pole to keep the person being captured from grabbing the pole. The opposite end of the sasumata pole would often have a metal cap, or ishizuki like those found on naginata and other polearms.

=== Modern use ===
Today, a modern version of the sasumata is still occasionally used by the police and as a self-defense tool. These modern sasumata are often made of aluminum, without the sharpened blades and spikes found on their medieval counterparts. They have been marketed to schools due to a growing fear of classroom invasions, which has prompted many schools in Japan to keep sasumata available for teachers to protect themselves and students and to detain a potential threat until the authorities can arrive. The introduction of sasumata to schools came to be popular after the Ikeda school massacre in 2001.

In November 2023, an employee of a jewellery store in Tokyo used a sasumata to drive off three robbers wearing motorcycle helmets, attracting nationwide interest and increased sales of the weapon.

== Gallery ==
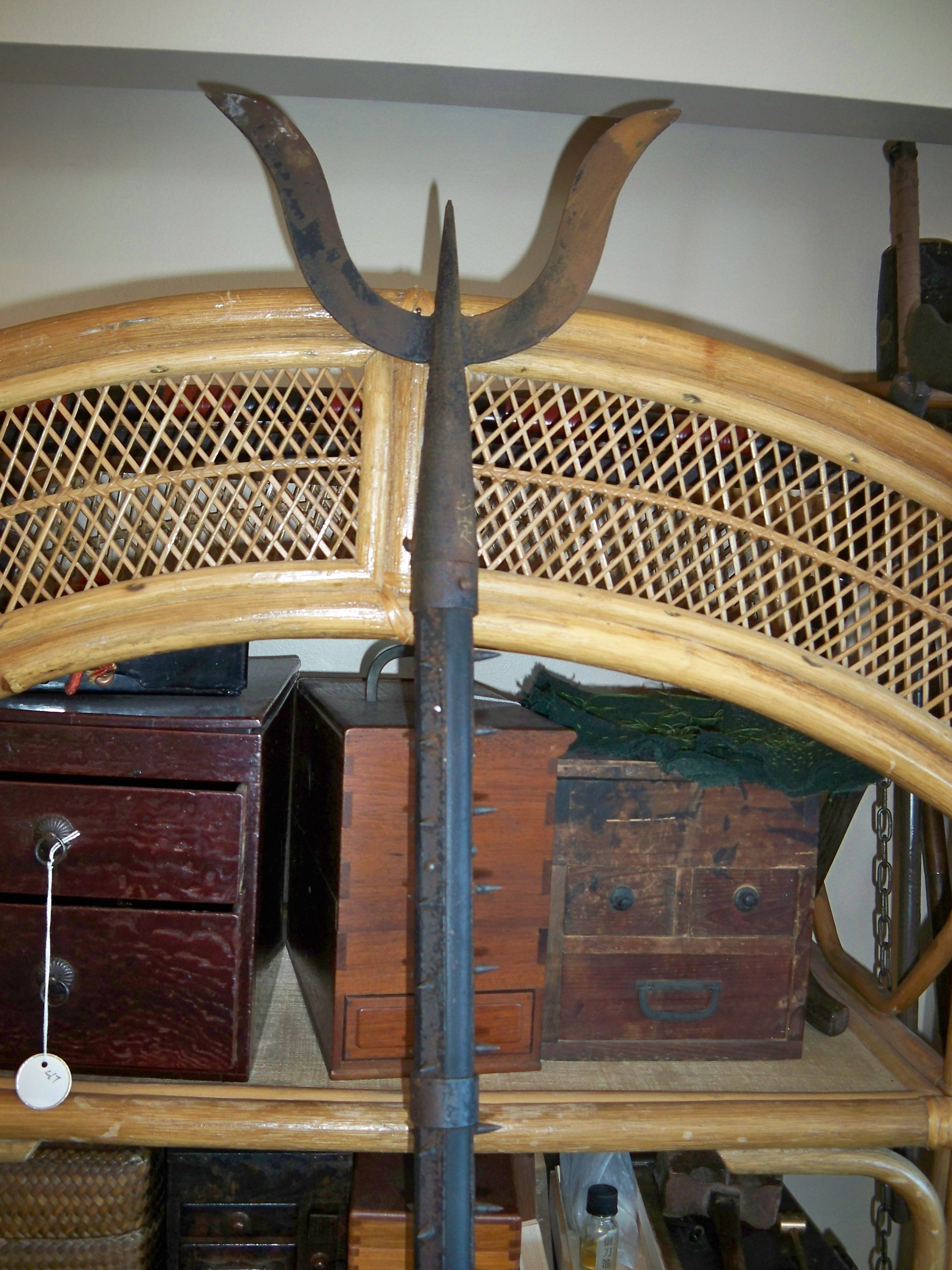
Edo period sasumata, used to capture criminal suspects and for crowd control

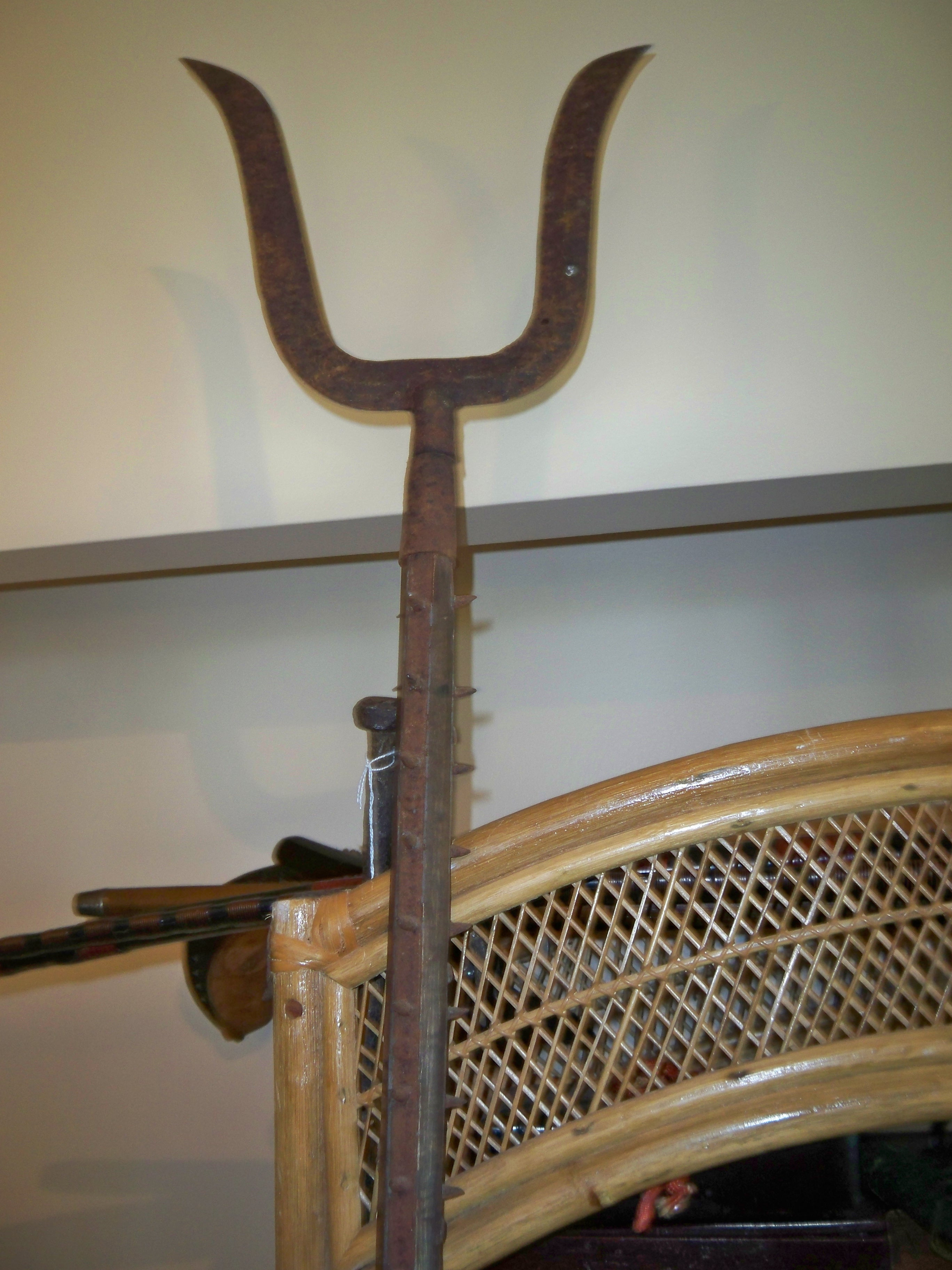
Edo period sasumata, used to capture criminal suspects and for crowd control

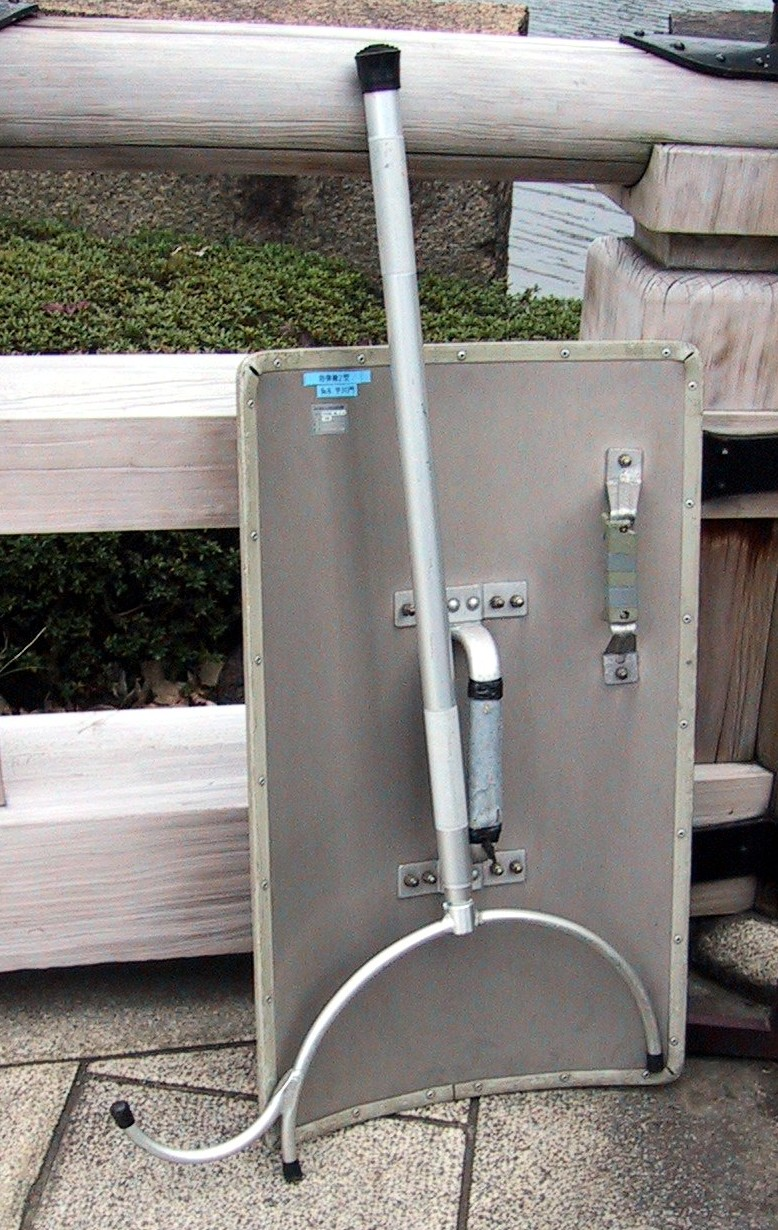
A modern sasumata

== See also ==
- Man catcher
- Monk's spade
- Sodegarami
- Torimono sandōgu
- Tsukubō

== Sources ==
- Cunningham, Don. Taiho-jutsu:Law and Order in the Age of the Samurai. Boston; Rutland, Vermont; Tokyo: Tuttle Publishing, 2004.
- 神之田常盛. 剣術神道霞流. 萩原印刷株式会社, 2003.
- Mol, Serge. Classic Weaponry of Japan: Special Weapons and Tactics of the Martial Arts. Tokyo; New York; London: Kodansha International, 2003.
