= Metsubushi =

Feudal Japanese police devices

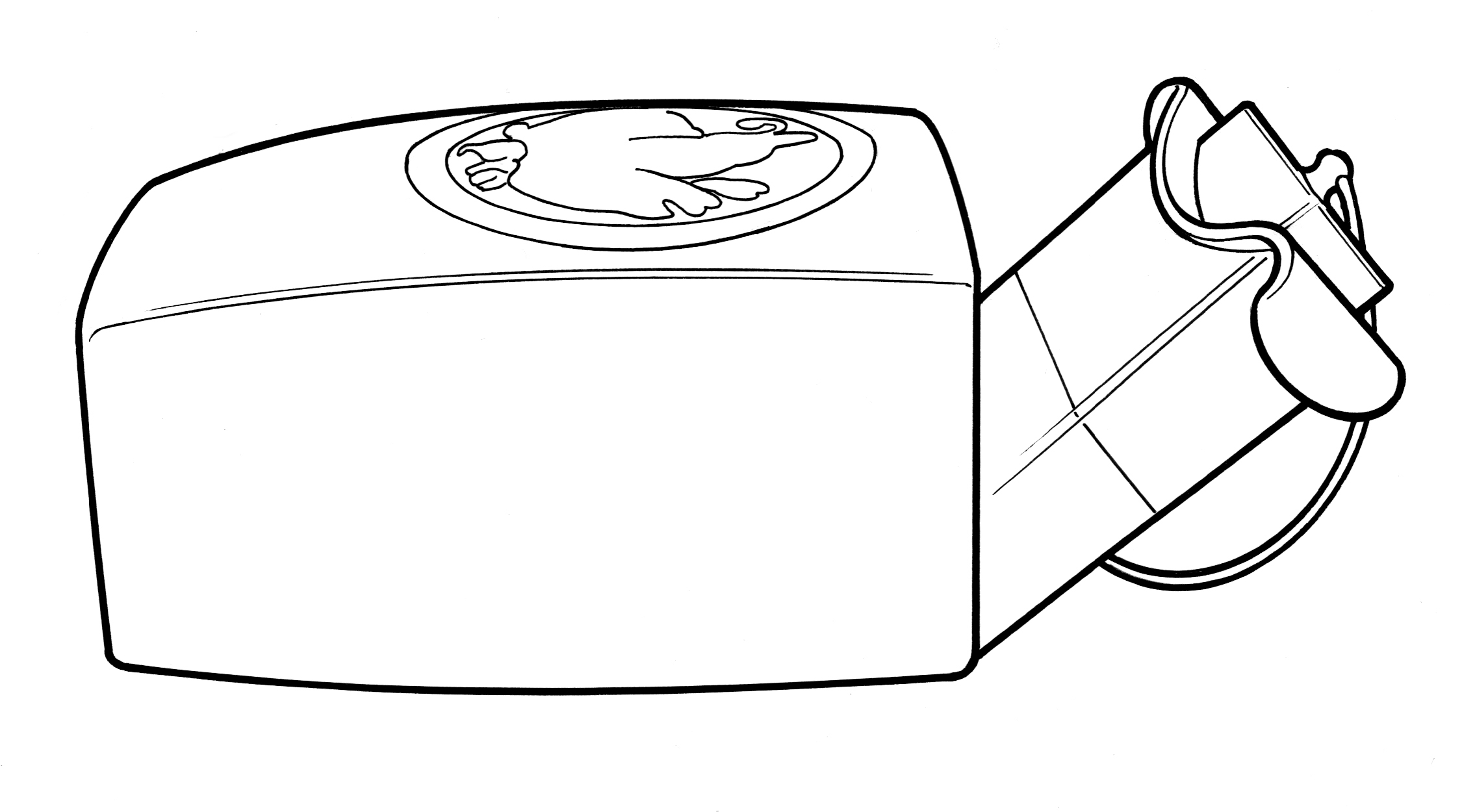
Line drawing of a metsubushi

Metsubushi (Japanese: 目潰し; lit. "eye closers") or gantsubushi are a variety of implements and techniques that were used in feudal Japan by samurai police and other individuals to temporarily or permanently blind or disorient an opponent.

== Description ==
One type of metsubushi was used by police for blowing powdered pepper or dust into the eyes of a suspect. It is described as being a lacquer or brass box with a wide mouthpiece for blowing on, and a hole or pipe on the other end for directing the powder into the eyes of the person being captured. One type of metsubushi powder was made up of ashes, ground-up pepper, mud, flour, and dirt. For severe damage, it could also include fine-ground glass. It was kept in hollowed-out eggs (happō), bamboo tubes or other small containers. When confronted by an attacker, a person would blow the metsubushi in the attacker's eyes, blinding them.

== See also ==
- Mace
- Pepper spray
- Ninjutsu
