= Sodegarami =

Japanese polearm

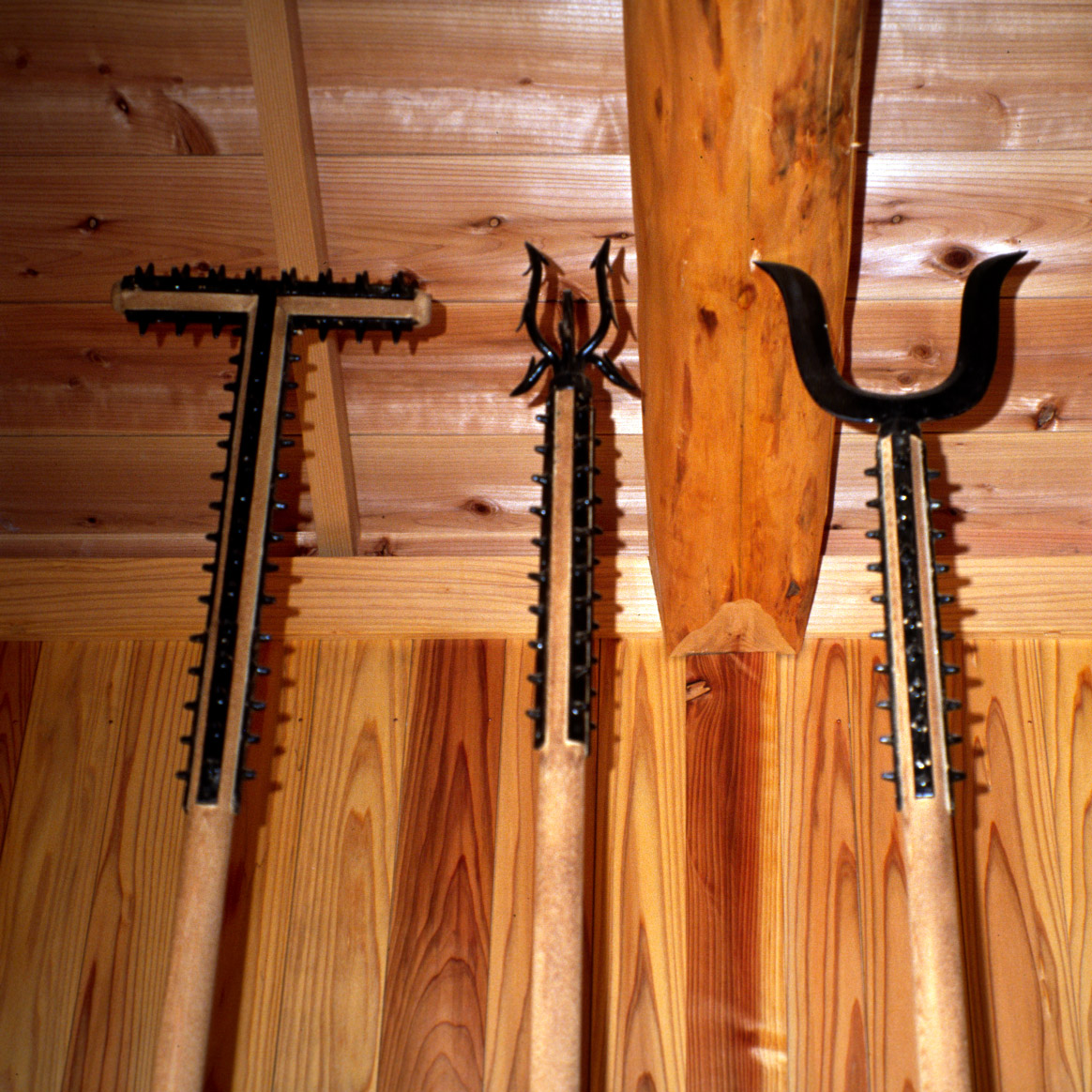
Weapons for capturing suspected criminals: on the left tsukubō, in the middle sodegarami, and on the right sasumata

The sodegarami (袖搦, sleeve entangler) is a polearm that was used by the samurai class and their retainers in feudal Japan.

== History and description ==
The sodegarami is a type of man catcher. It is around 2 m (6 ft 7 in) in length, with multiple barbed heads facing forwards and backwards. The pole is sturdy hardwood with sharp metal barbs or spines attached to metal strips on one end to keep the person being captured from grabbing the pole. The opposite end of the pole has a metal cap or ishizuki, like those found on naginata and other polearms. The sodegarami, tsukubō (push pole), and sasumata (spear fork) comprise the torimono sandōgu (three implements of arresting) used by samurai police to capture suspected criminals uninjured. The sodegarami was used to entangle the sleeves and clothing of an individual who could then be more easily disarmed or dealt with.

The sodegarami evolved from the yagaramogara, which was a long pole implement employed by naval forces. That instrument in turn was derived from the Chinese langxian, which was used to defend against Japanese pirates during the Ming dynasty (1368–1644). Alternative names for the sodegarami include roga-bō, shishigashira, neji, and tōrigarami.

== Gallery ==
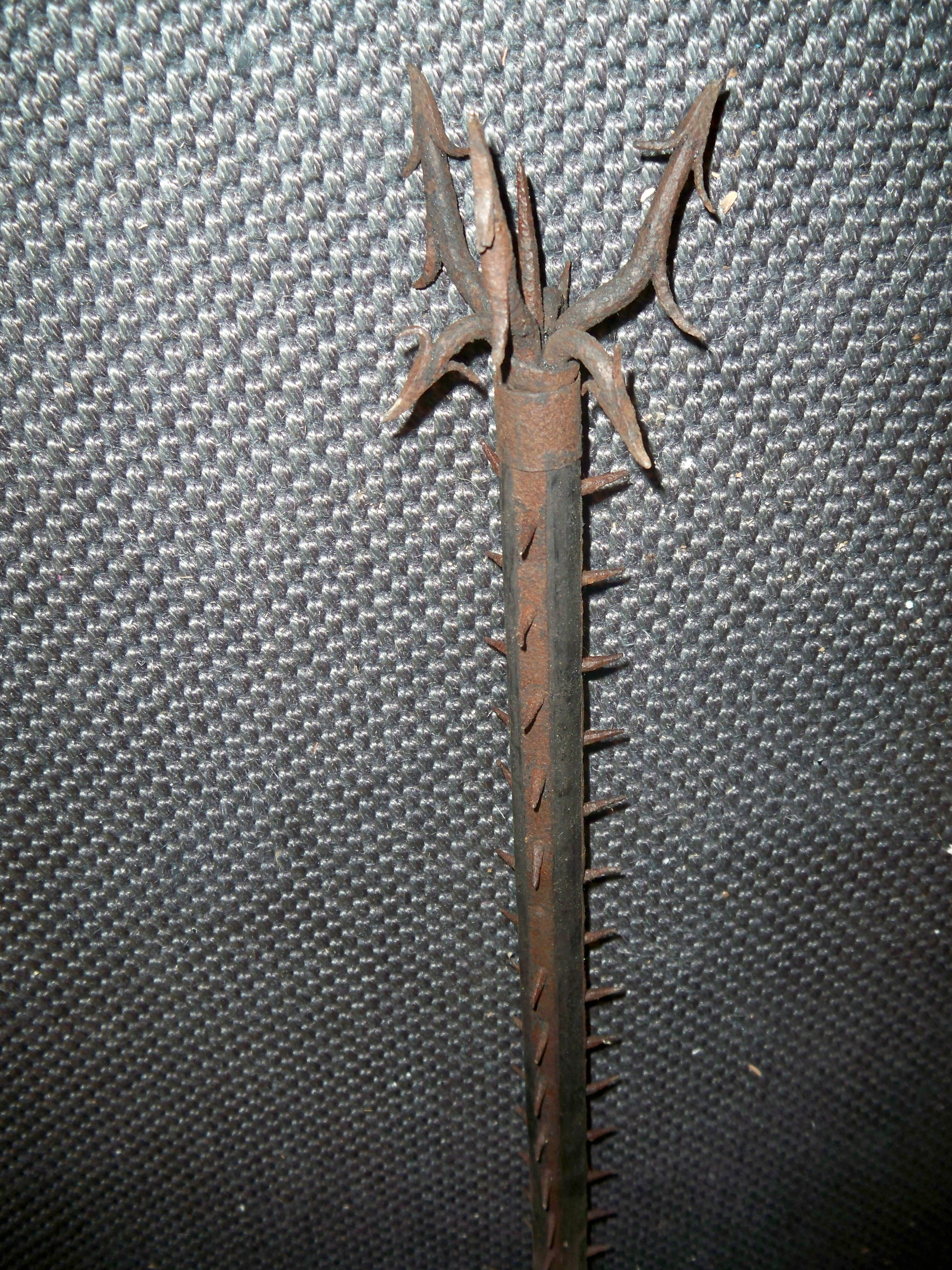
Edo period sodegarami, used by samurai police and security forces to capture armed suspects

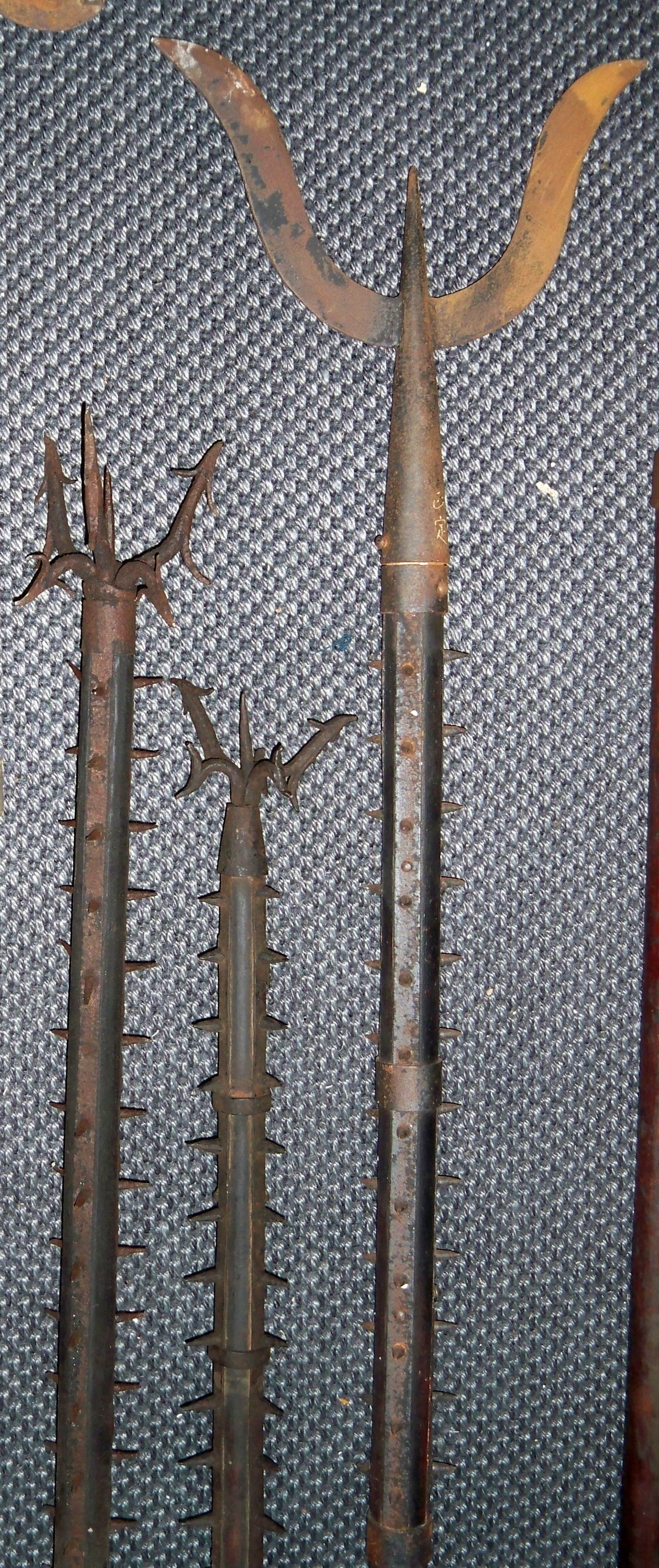
Sodegarami and sasumata

== Sources ==
- Cunningham, Don. Taiho-jutsu:Law and Order in the Age of the Samurai. Boston; Rutland, Vermont; Tokyo: Tuttle Publishing, 2004.
- 神之田常盛. 剣術神道霞流. 萩原印刷株式会社, 2003.
- Mol, Serge. Classic Weaponry of Japan: Special Weapons and Tactics of the Martial Arts. Tokyo; New York; London: Kodansha International, 2003.
