= Torimono sandōgu =

Japanese pole weapons

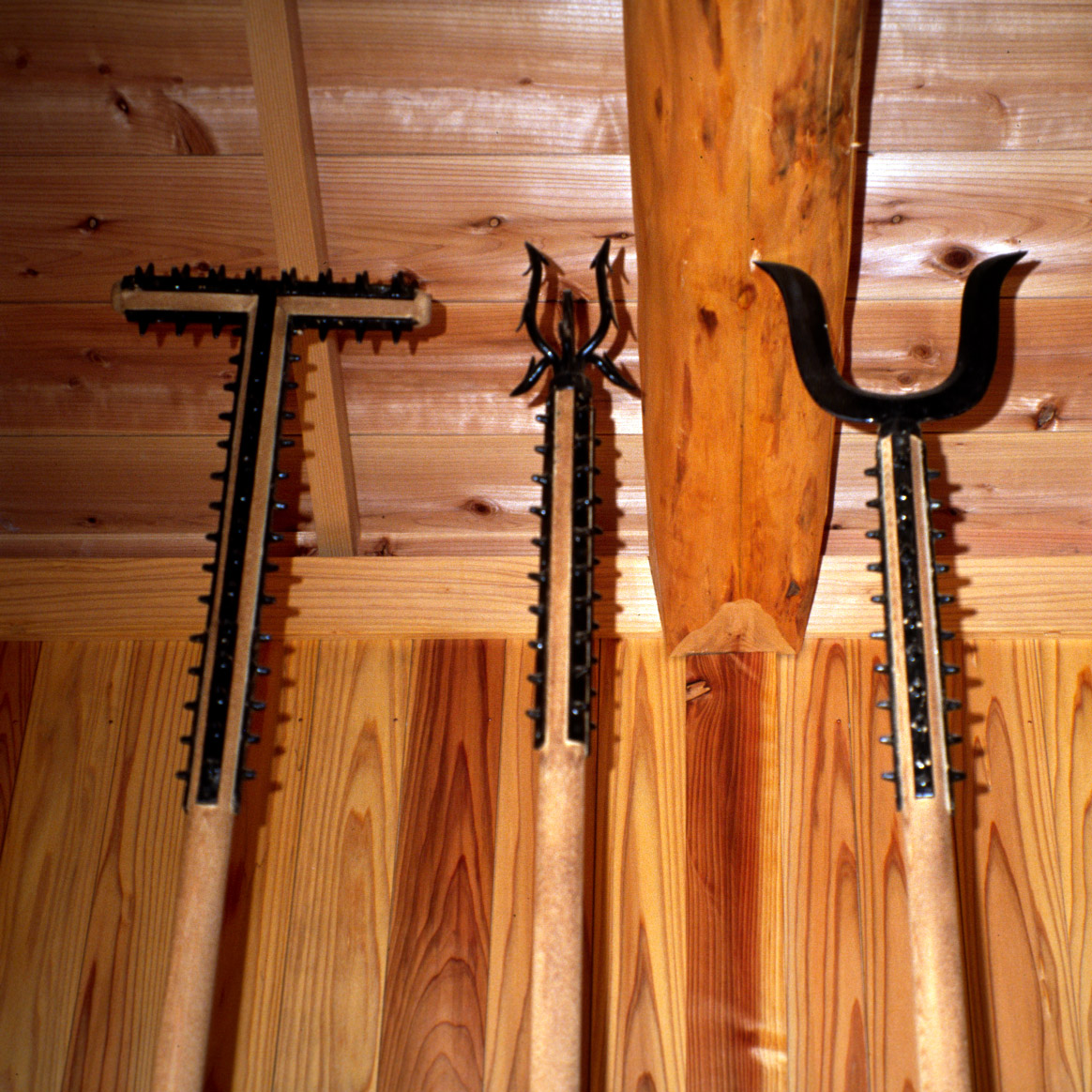
Torimono sandōgu (three tools of arresting), weapons for capturing suspected criminals (from left) tsukubo, sodegarami, sasumata

The torimono sandōgu (also torimono hogu or mitsu dogu) were known as the three tools of arresting. The torimono sandōgu were three types of polearms used by the samurai class and their retainers in feudal Japan during the Edo period.

== History ==
In Edo period Japan the samurai were in charge of police operations; various levels of samurai police with help from non-samurai commoners used many types of non lethal weapons in order to capture suspected criminals for trial. The torimono sandōgu was part of the six tools of the police station (bansho rokugin or keigo roku-go), these were the kanamuchi, kiriko no bo, tetto, sodegarami, tsukubo, and the sasumata. Samurai police were required to have these six tools or weapons on hand to effectively deal with disturbances. The torimono sandōgu were symbols of office and were often displayed in front of police checkpoints or used in processions, especially while convicted prisoners were being led to their execution.

== Description and use ==
The torimono sandōgu consisted of the sodegarami (sleeve entangler), sasumata (spear fork) and tsukubo (push pole). All three implements were mounted on long hardwood poles usually around 2 m (6 ft 7 in) in length, sharp metal barbs or spines attached to metal strips covered one end of these implements to keep the person being captured from grabbing the pole. The opposite end of the pole would have a metal cap, or ishizuki like those found on naginata and other pole weapons. Torimono sandōgu implements were designed to entangle, restrain and obstruct criminals rather than injure them.

== See also ==
- Sasumata
- Sodegarami
- Tsukubō
