= Tsukubō =

Japanese polearm

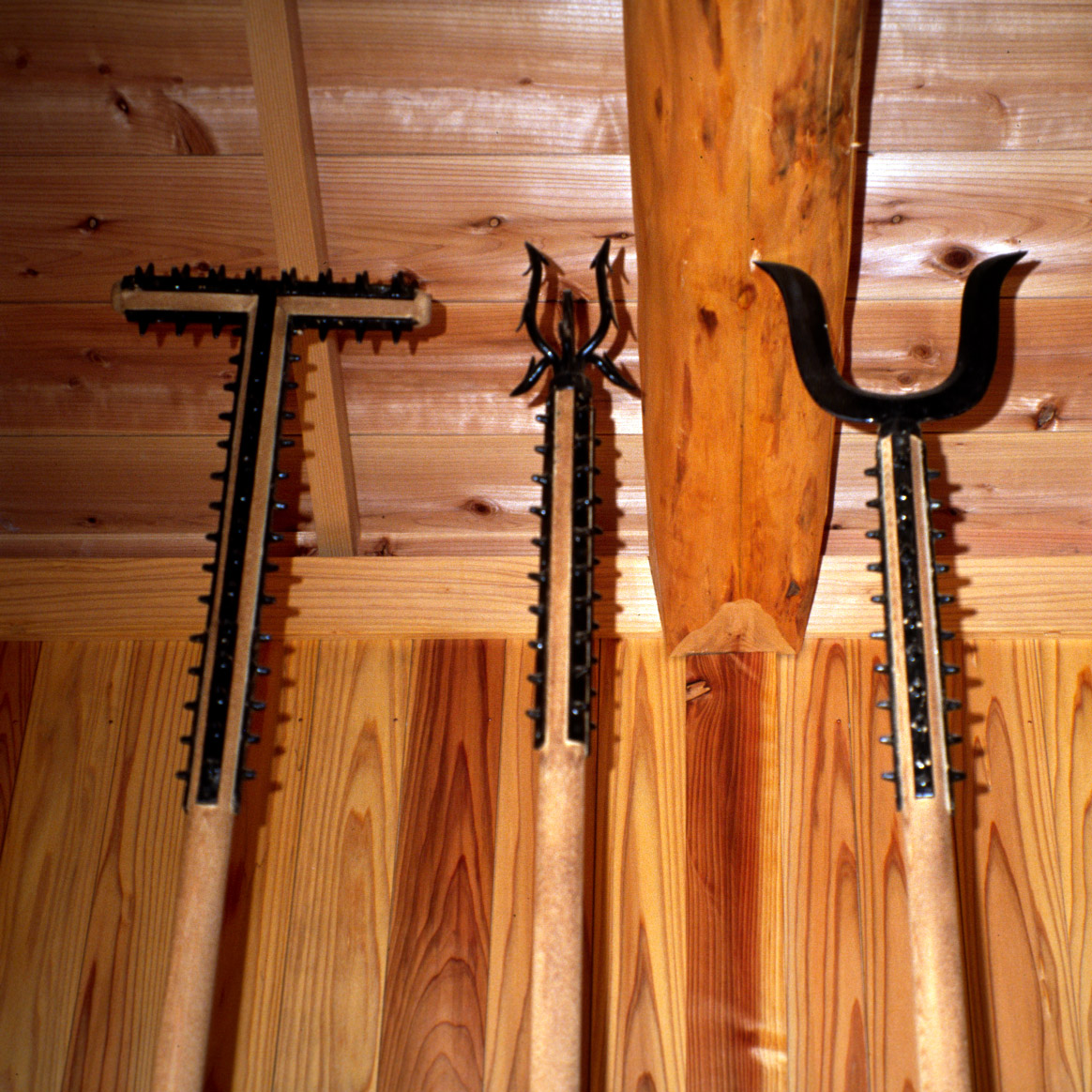
- Weapons used for capturing suspected criminals: on the left tsukubō, in the middle sodegarami and on the right sasumata
- Type: Polearm
- Place of origin: Japan

Service history
- Used by: Samurai police

Specifications
- Length: Approximately 2 meters (6 ft 7 in)

The tsukubō (突棒) (push pole) was a polearm used by the samurai class and their retainers in feudal Japan.

== History and description ==
In Edo period Japan, the samurai were in charge of police operations. Various levels of samurai police, with help from non-samurai commoners, used many types of non lethal weapons in order to capture suspected criminals for trial. Historically the tsukubō was used as a type of man catcher, usually around 2 m (6 ft 7 in) in length, with a T-shaped head.

The head of the tsukubō would have various metal spikes and barbs. The pole was hardwood with sharp metal barbs or spines attached to metal strips on one end to keep the person being captured from grabbing the pole. The opposite end of the pole would have a metal cap, or ishizuki like those found on naginata and other polearms. The tsukubō was one component of the torimono sandōgu (three implements of arresting), along with the sodegarami (sleeve entangler) and the sasumata (spear fork) used by samurai police to capture suspected criminals uninjured. The tsukubō could be used to push, pull, or trip a suspect.

The tsukubō may have been developed from a type of Japanese rake used by farmers according to Don Cunningham. Originally made of wood, the teeth were eventually covered with or made of metal so that they would last longer. It is likely that they were used by farmers as impromptu weapons when necessary. Don Cunningham also states that the tsukubō was also called teppa, hakan, gettetsuken, saburi, and hoko.

== See also ==
- Sasumata
- Sodegarami
- Torimono sandōgu
