= Sword of steel =

Steel sword or sword of steel is a sword made from steel, an iron alloy.

It may also refer to:

== Narratives ==
- Swords of Steel (book), a 1933 novel by Elsie Singmaster
- Swords of Steel (anthology series), a series of anthologies published by DMR Books
- "A Sword of Steel" (script), a 1966 screenplay by Padraic Fallon

== Music ==
- "Sword of Steel" (song), a 1995 song by Nocturnal Rites off the album In a Time of Blood and Fire
- "Swords of Steel" (song), a 2004 song by Hirax off the album The New Age of Terror
- "Steel Sword" (song), a 2014 song by Holy Blood off the album Day of Vengeance (album)

== Other uses ==
- Sword Kladenets, also called the "Sword of Steel", a mythological sword in Russian mythology

== See also ==
- sword steel, steel suitable for sword making
- Tekkan (also called tetsu-ken (鉄刀, steel sword); "鉄" being Japanese for steel and iron), an Edo-period blunt Japanese sword
- Iron Age sword
- Iron sword (disambiguation)
- Sword (disambiguation)
- Steel (disambiguation)
