= Bugei jūhappan =

Combat and martial arts technique

The Bugei jūhappan (武芸十八般 "Eighteen Kinds Of Martial Arts") is a selection of combat techniques and martial arts used by the samurai of Tokugawa-era Japan. Established by Hirayama Gyozo, the concept is based on earlier Chinese traditions, such as Eighteen Arms of Wushu.

== Eighteen arts ==
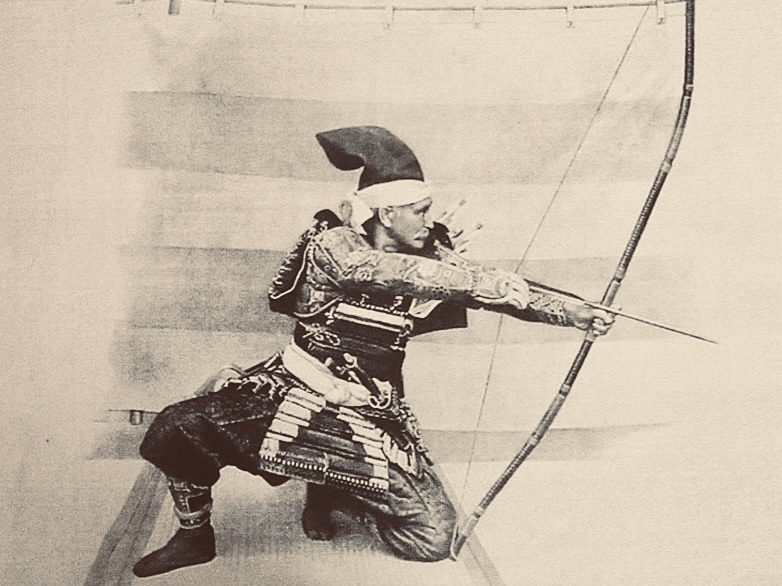
1. Kyūjutsu

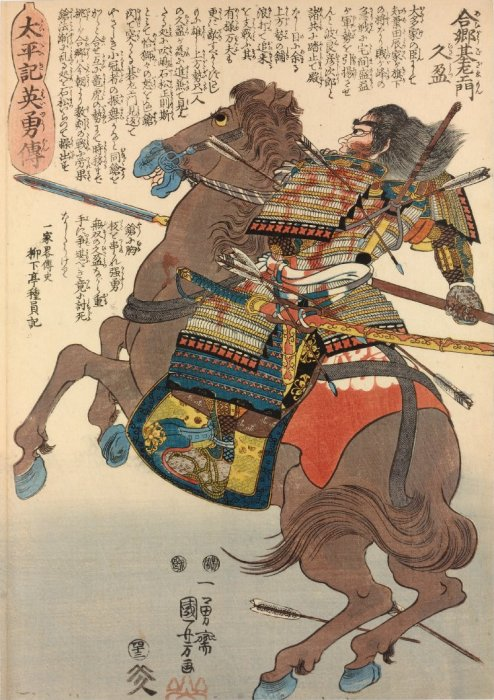
2. Bajutsu

The Eighteen Arts consist of native Japanese martial arts techniques and tactics. Within each art, various ryūha (schools) developed, with different methods of performing that particular art. Certain ryūha, in turn, influenced the martial arts that were included in the list, like Asayama Ichiden-ryū, Kukishin-ryū, Shinden-Fudo-ryū and Takagi Yōshin-ryū. The exact list varies, but is commonly held to include:

1. Kyūjutsu, archery.
2. Bajutsu, horseriding.
3. Sōjutsu, fighting with a yari (spear).
4. Kenjutsu, fencing.
5. Suieijutsu, swimming in armour.
6. Iaijutsu, sword-drawing.
7. Tantōjutsu, knife-fighting.
8. Juttejutsu, fighting with a jutte (truncheon).
9. Shurikenjutsu, throwing shuriken.
10. Fukumibarijutsu, needle-spitting.
11. Naginatajutsu, fighting with a polearm, usually a naginata.
12. Hōjutsu, shooting (with firearms).
13. Hojōjutsu, tying up an opponent.
14. Yawara, grappling and fighting unarmed.
15. Bōjutsu, fighting with a bō (staff).
16. Kusarigamajutsu, fighting with a chain-and-sickle.
17. Mōjirijutsu, fighting with a barbed staff.
18. Ninjutsu, espionage.
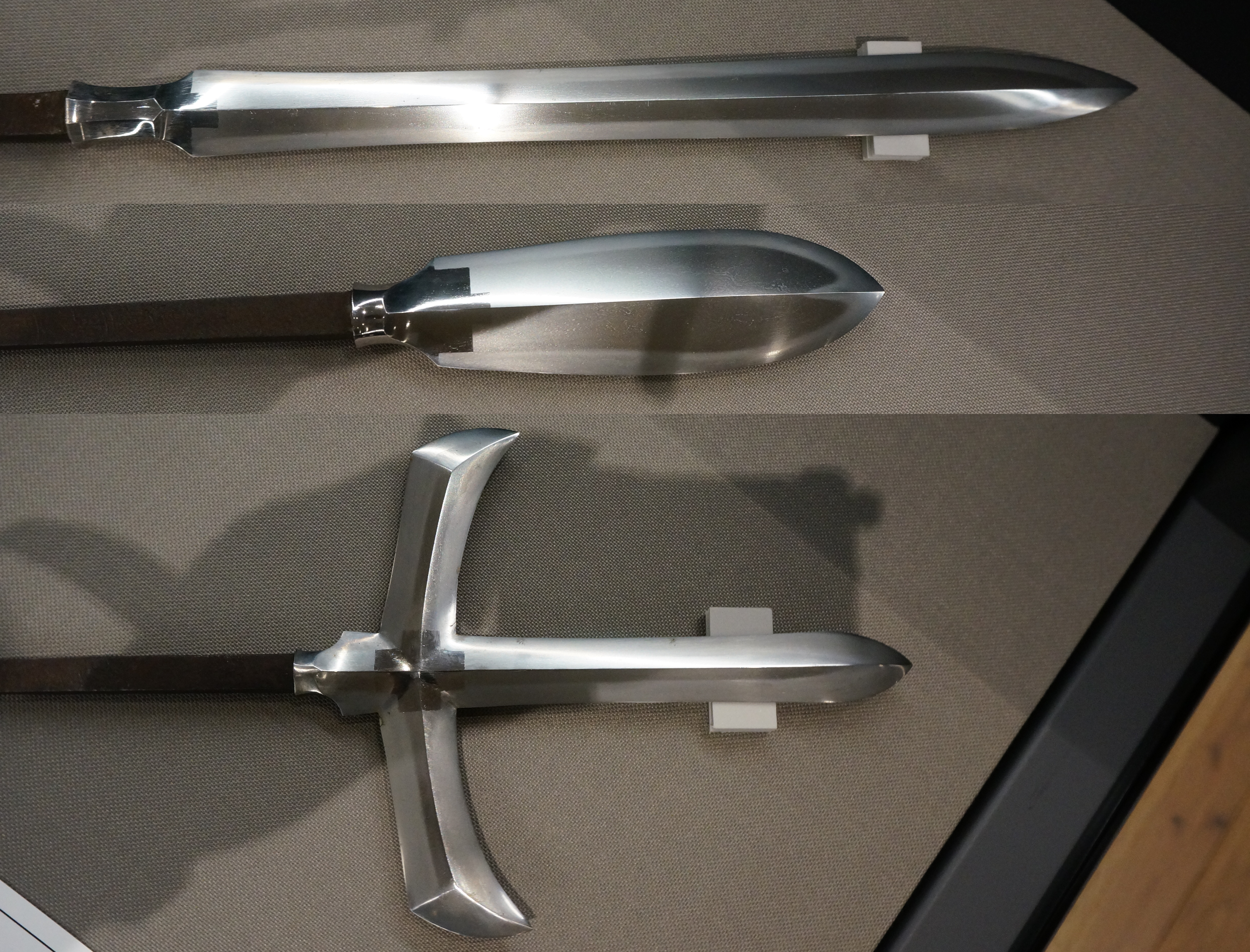
3. Sōjutsu

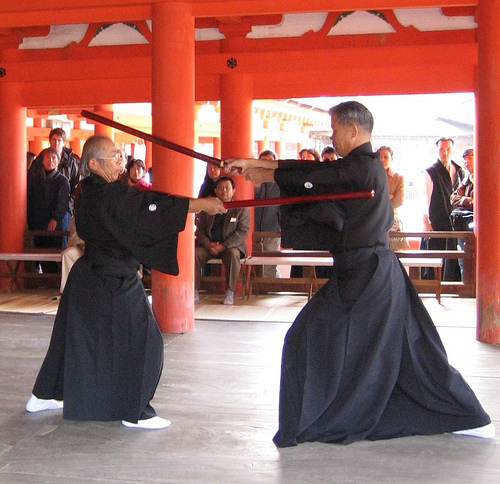
4. Kenjutsu

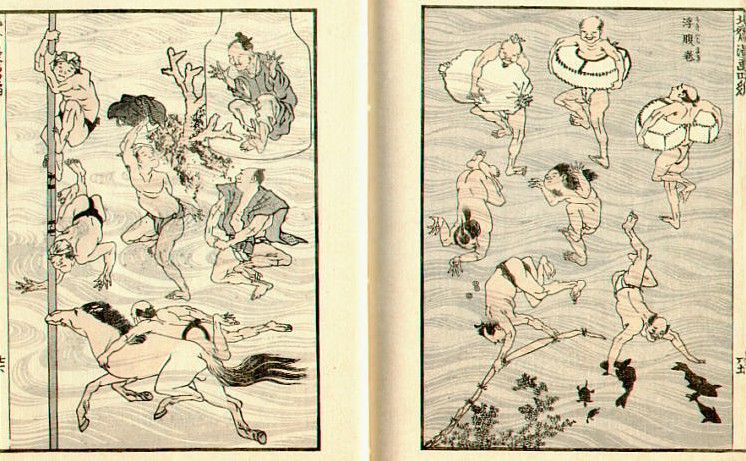
5. Suijutsu

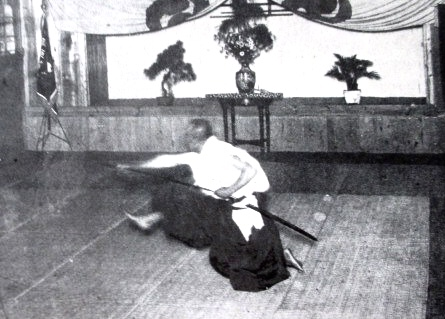
6. Iaijutsu

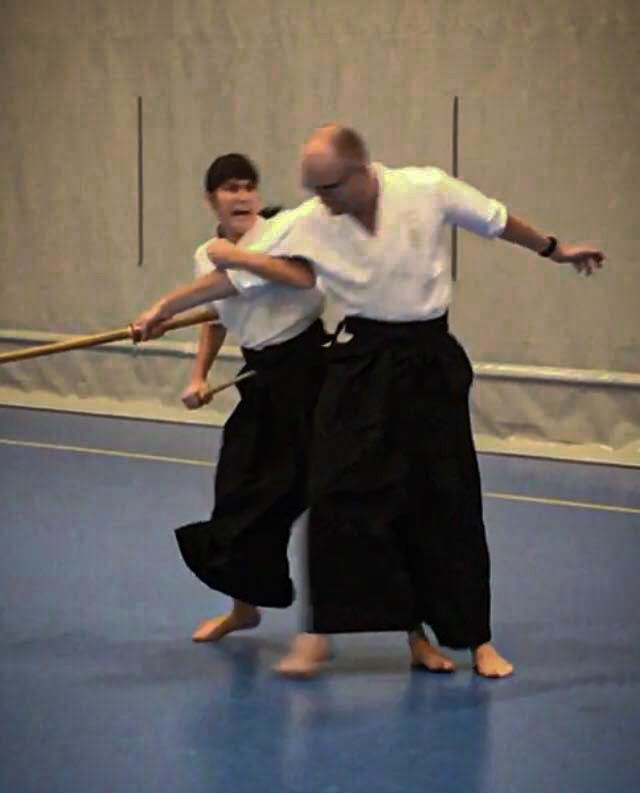
7. Tantojutsu

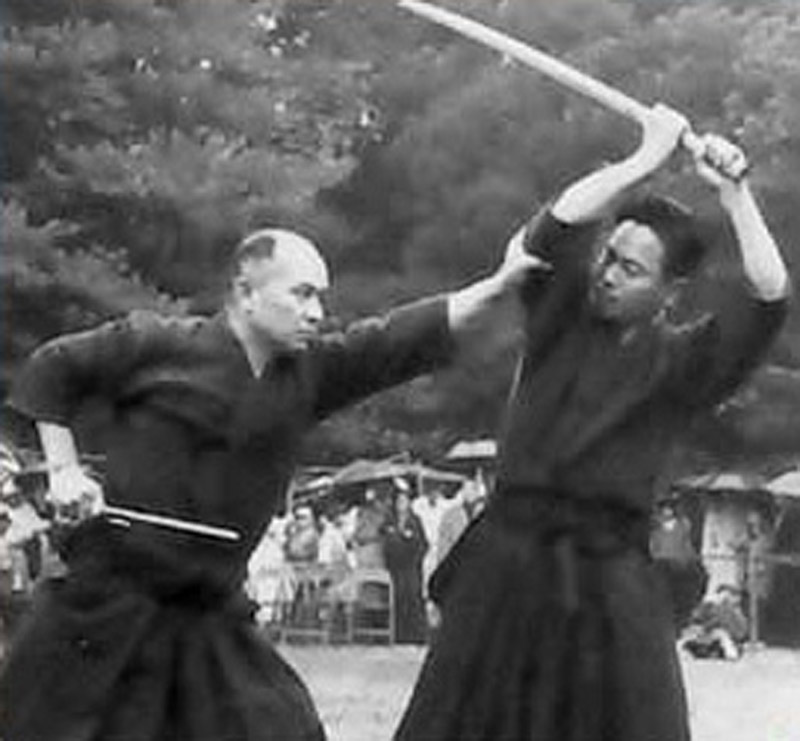
8. Jittejutsu

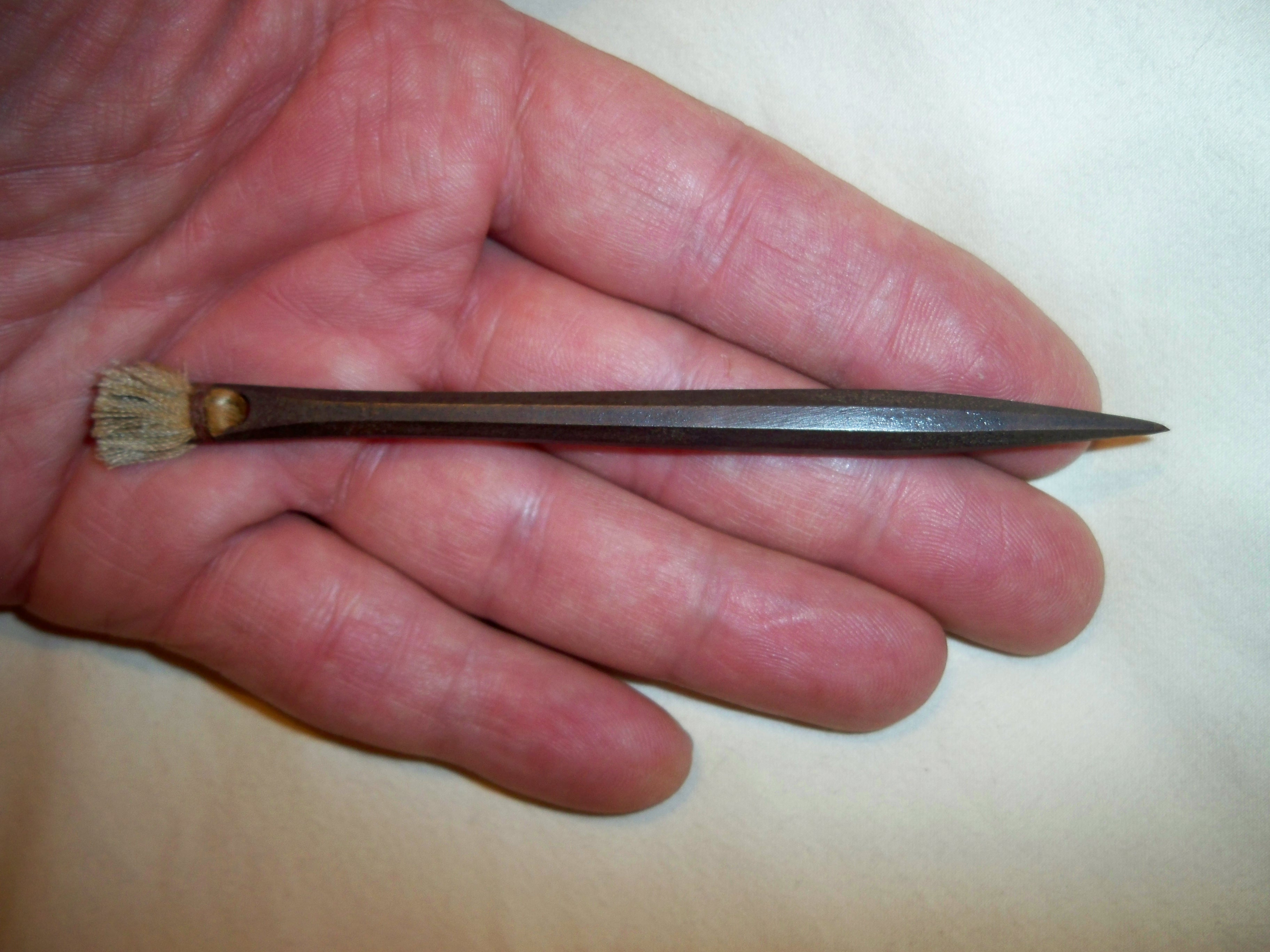
9. Shurikenjutsu

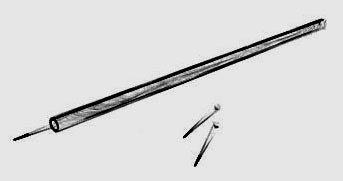
10. Fukumibarijutsu

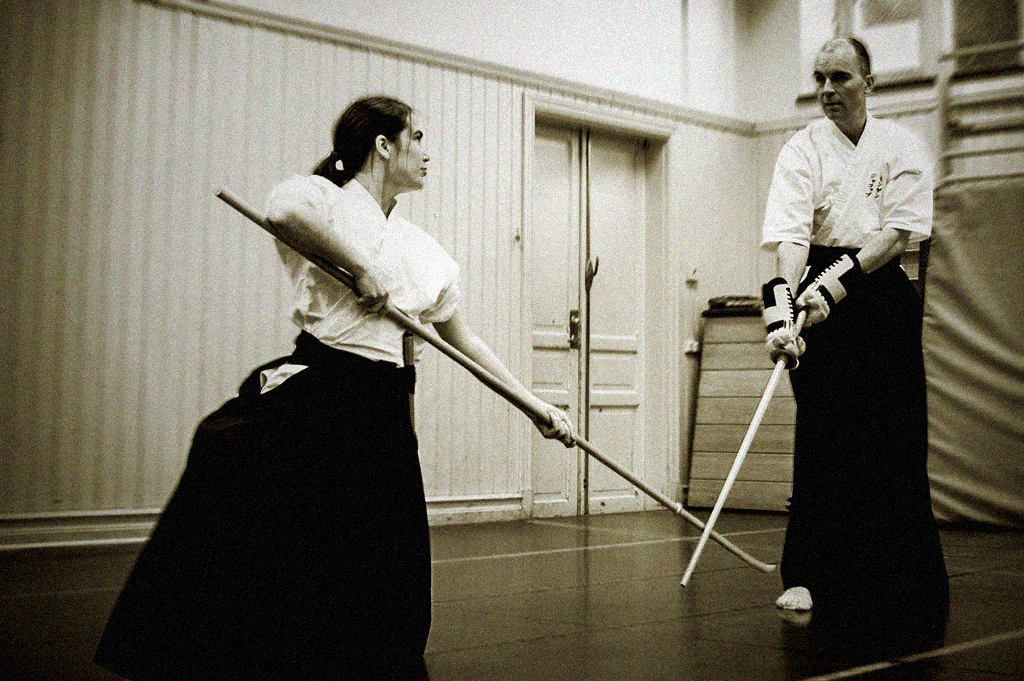
11. Naginatajutsu

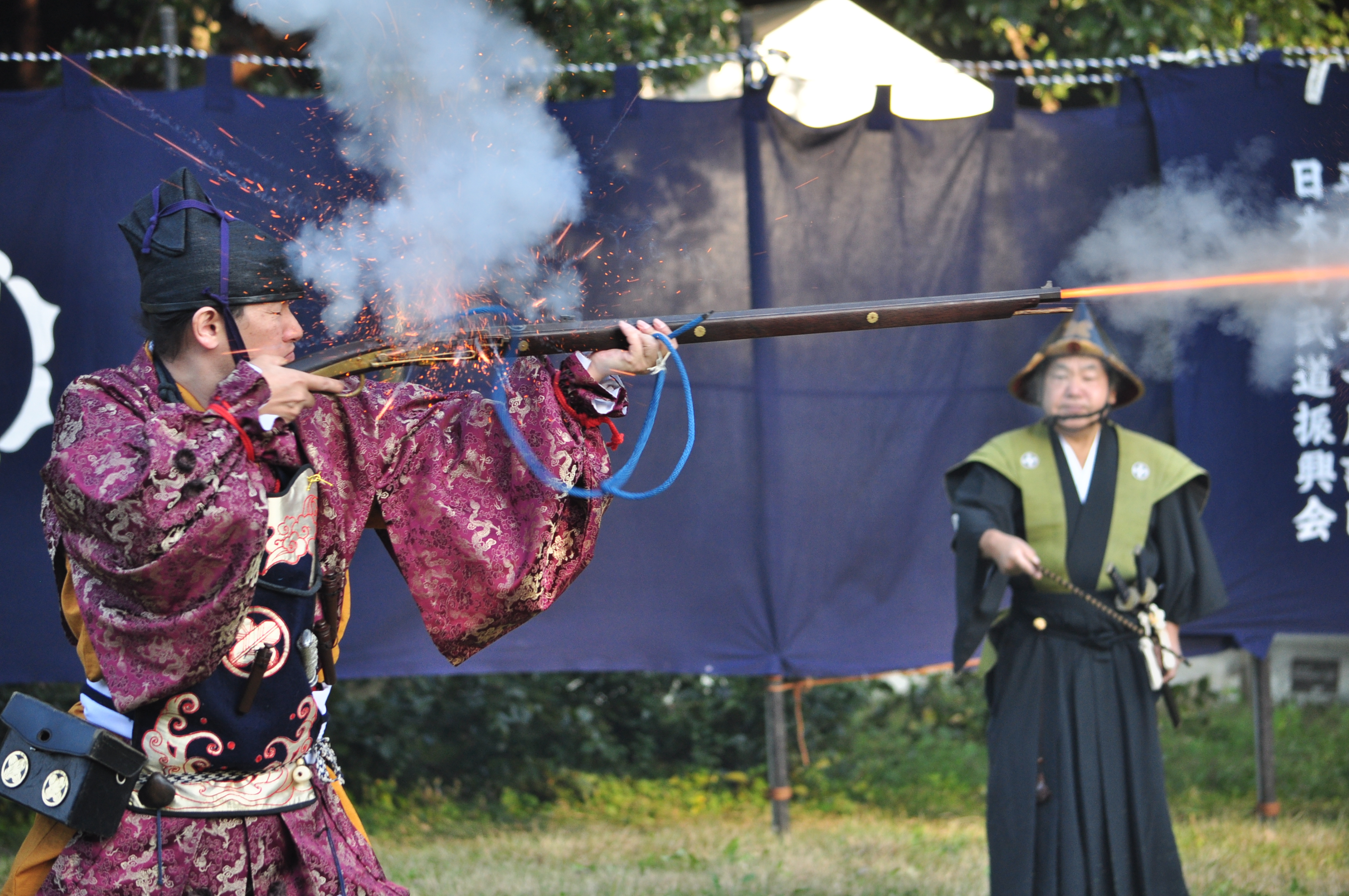
12. Hōjutsu

13. Hojōjutsu

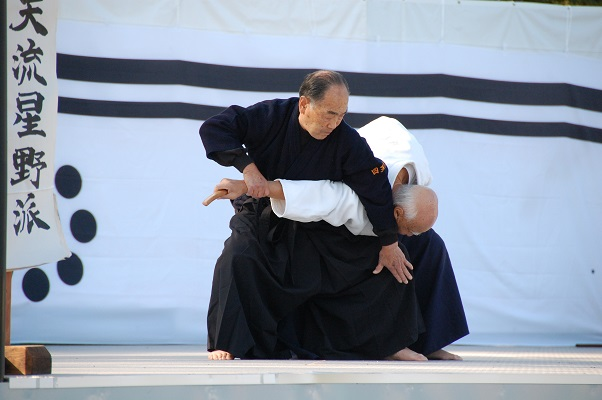
14. Yawara

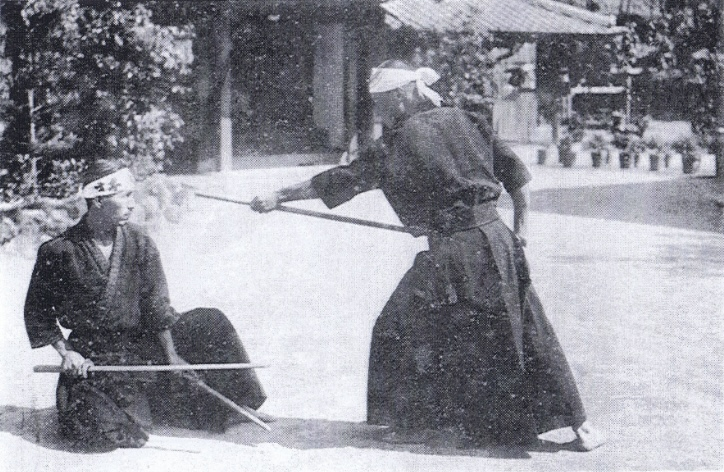
15. Bōjutsu

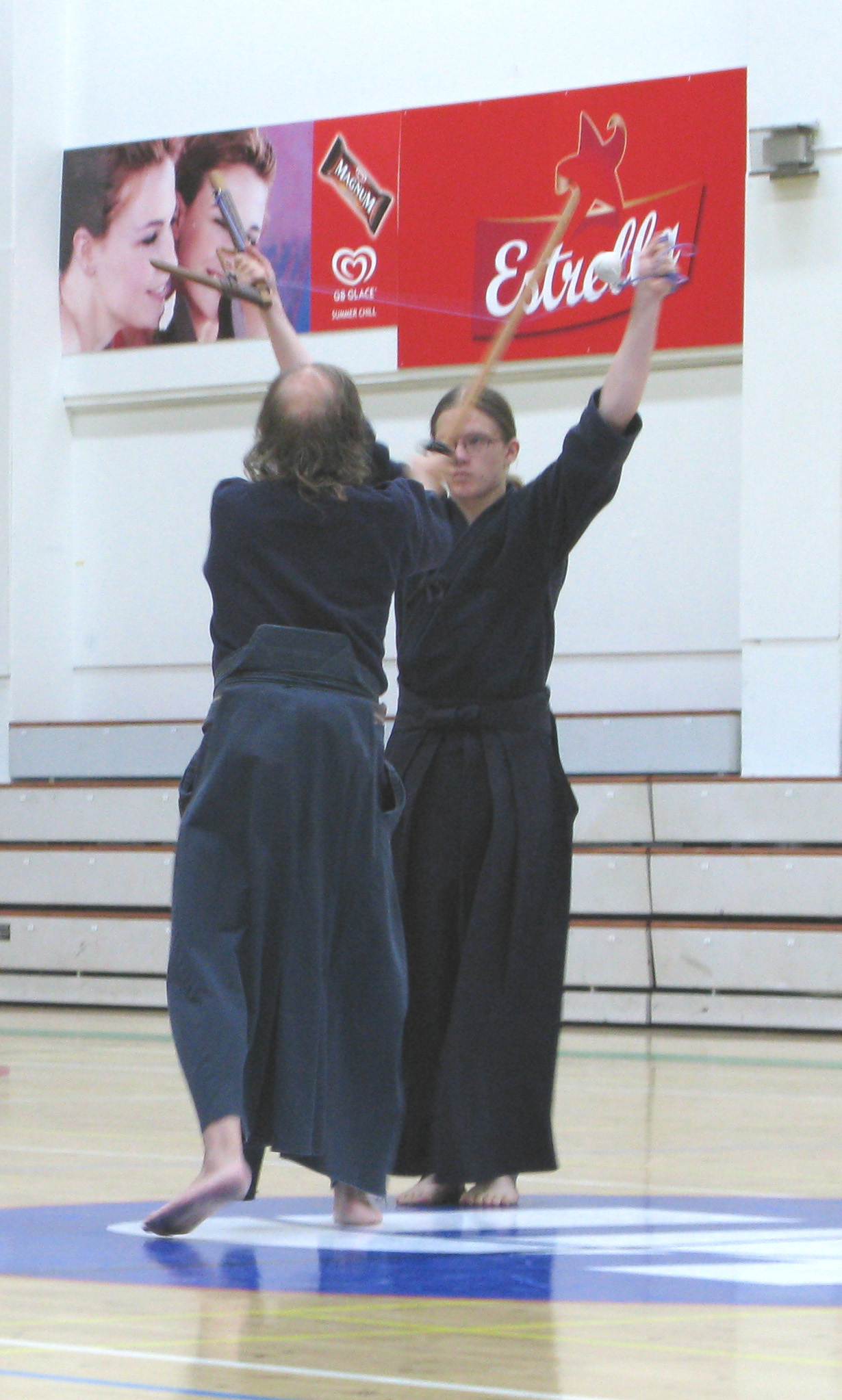
16. Kusarigamajutsu

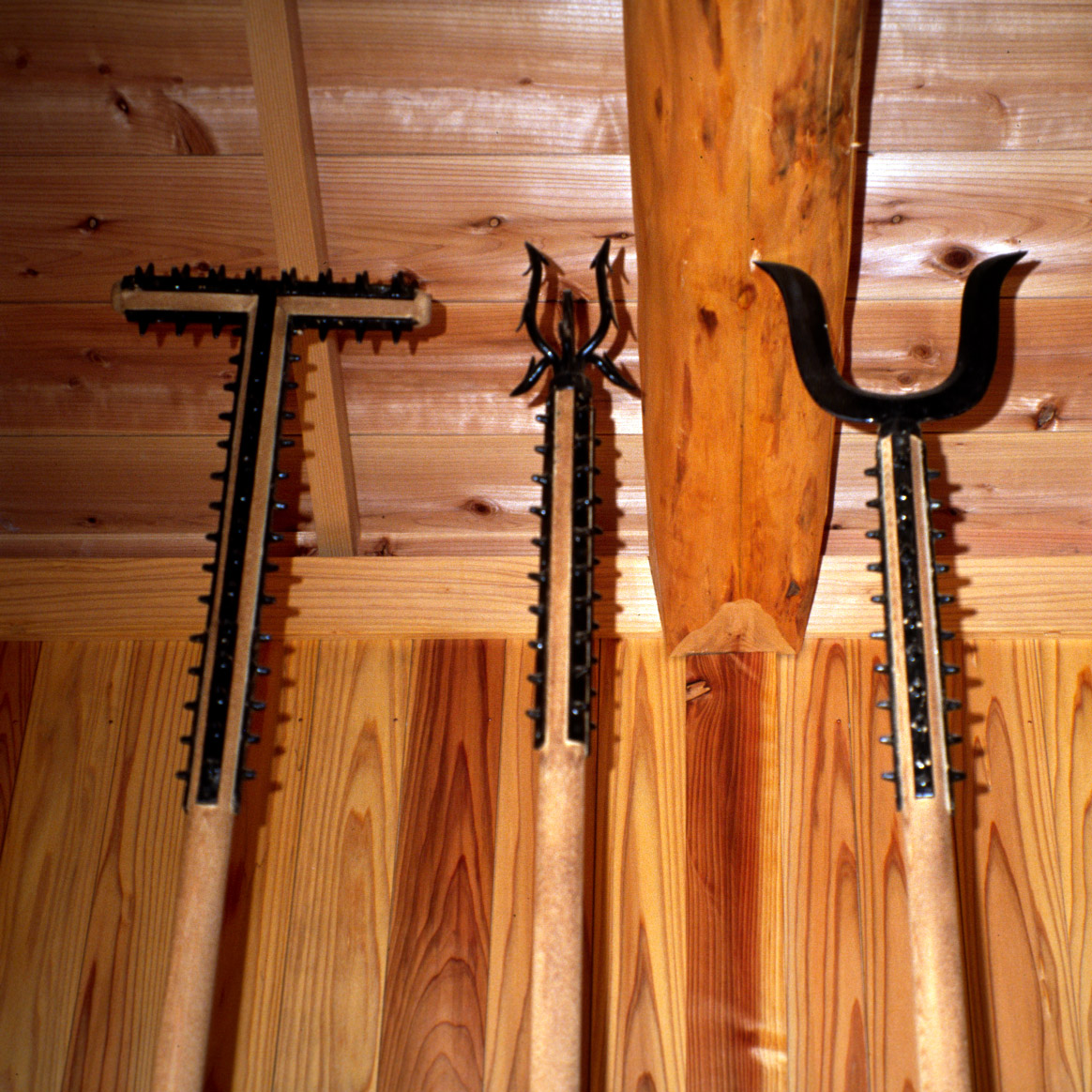
17. Mōjirijutsu

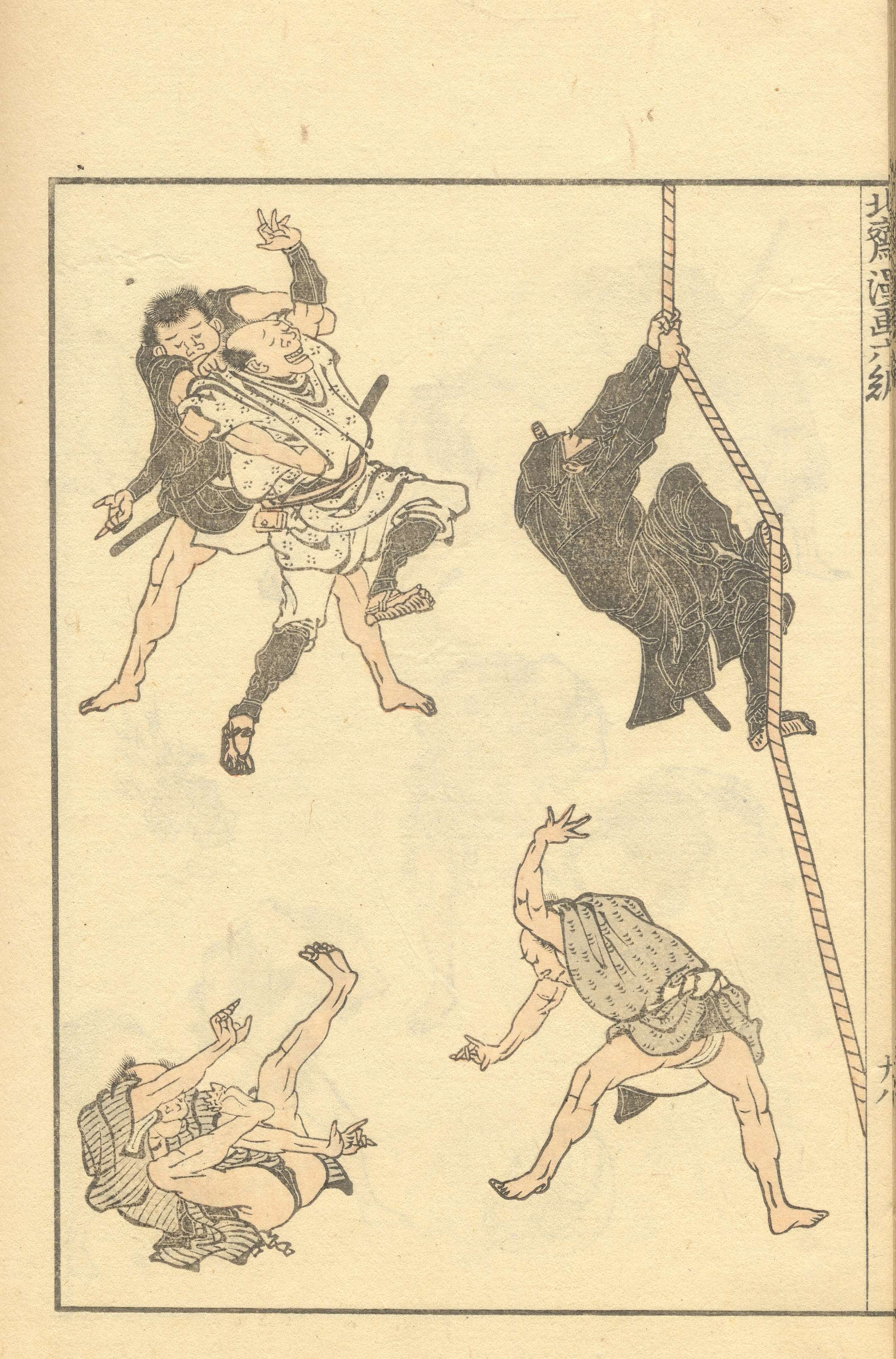
18. Ninjutsu

Other arts that were often included in the list are:

- Chikujōjutsu, fortifying a castle against siege.
- Yabusame, mounted archery.
- Yadomejutsu, deflecting flying arrows.
- Saiminjutsu, hypnotism.
