= Iron sword =

Iron sword or sword of iron, is a sword made of iron.

Iron sword may also refer to:

== Arts and entertainment ==
- Ironsword: Wizards & Warriors II, a 1989 videogame
- The Iron Sword (book), a 2022 novel by Julie Kagawa, in The Iron Fey Series
- Swords of Iron (book), a 1956 novel by Joyce Reason
- Iron Sword Sect, a fictional martial arts organization in wuxia fiction
- "Iron Sword" Tian Qi, a fictional character from the 1977 film The Sentimental Swordsman

== Military operations ==
- Iron Swords War, the Israeli name for the Gaza war
- Operation Iron Sword, a recurring NATO training exercise which took place 2014–2016

== See also ==
- Sword iron, iron suitable for sword making
- Tekkan (also called tetsu-ken (鉄刀, iron sword)), an Edo-period blunt Japanese sword
- Iron Age sword
- Sword of steel (disambiguation)
- Sword (disambiguation)
- Iron (disambiguation)
