= Aquathlon (underwater wrestling) =

Competitive underwater wrestling

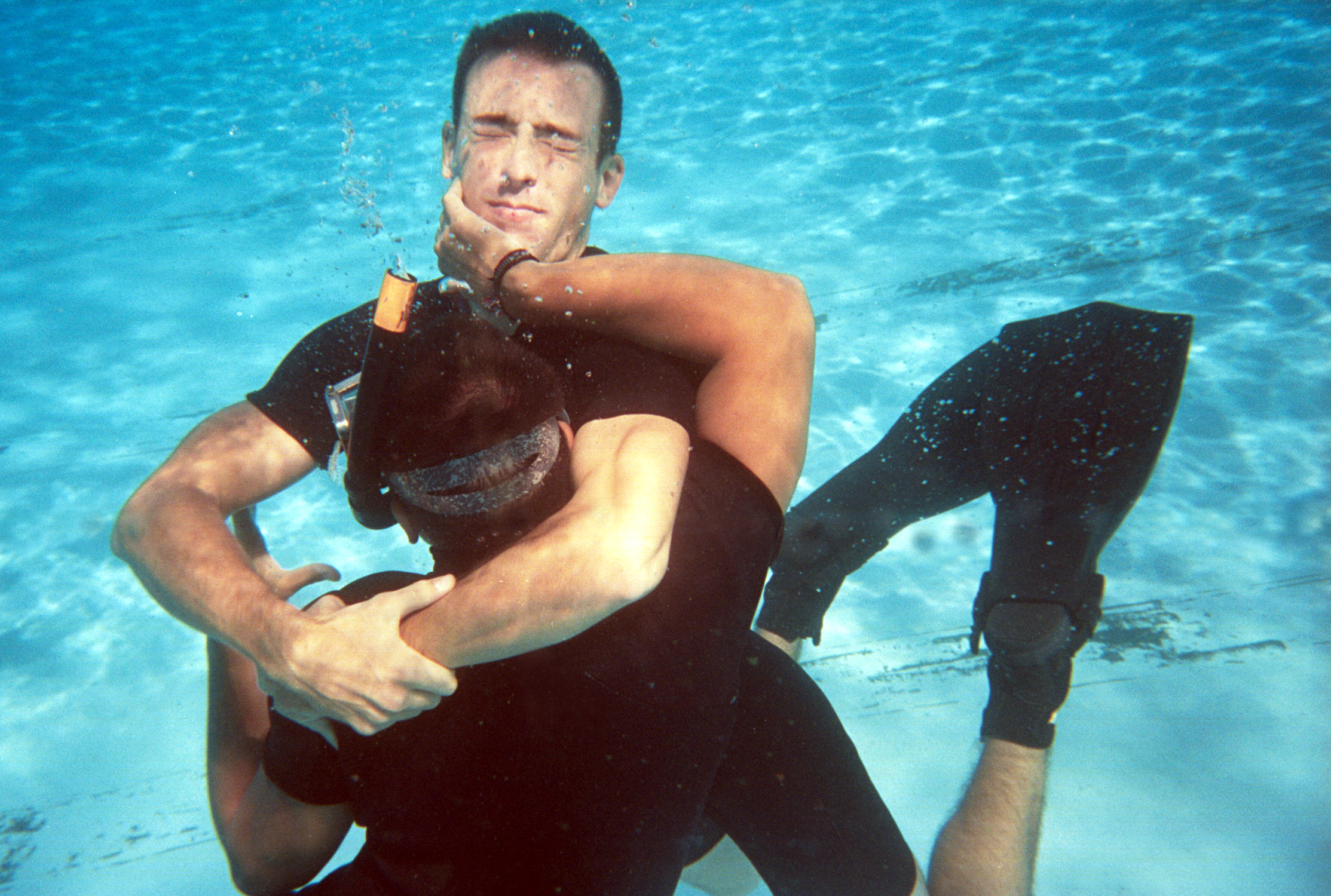
- US Navy servicemen practise underwater search and rescue scenarios involving combative or panicky victims, which corresponds to certain aquathlonic disciplines
- Highest governing body: CMAS
- Nicknames: Underwater Wrestling
- First played: Moscow, 1982

Characteristics
- Contact: yes
- Type: Aquatic
- Equipment: diving mask, fins & water polo cap
- Venue: Swimming pool

Aquathlon (also known as underwater wrestling) is an underwater sport, where two competitors wearing masks and fins wrestle underwater in an attempt to remove a ribbon from each other's ankle band in order to win the bout. The "combat" takes place in a 5-metre (16 ft) square ring within a swimming pool, and is made up of three 30-second rounds, with a fourth round played in the event of a tie. The sport originated during the 1980s in the former USSR (now Russia) and was first played at international level in 1993. It was recognised by the Confédération Mondiale des Activités Subaquatiques (CMAS) in 2008. Combat aquathlon practice training engagements not only under water, but also afloat, above the water surface, both with or without diving gear, utilizing dummy weapons (rubber knives, bayonetted rifles, etc.) or barehanded, combined with grappling and choking techniques in order to neutralize or submit the opponent.

== Competition area ==
The sport is conducted in a swimming pool with a water depth between 2 metres (6.6 ft) and 6 metres (20 ft). The competition area consists of a 5 metres (16 ft) square ring and a 2.5 metres (8.2 ft) wide free area around the ring, both marked with ropes floating on the surface of the water. One side of the ring is marked with a red rope (known as the red side) while the opposite side is marked with a yellow rope (known as the yellow side). At the bottom of the pool, a 5 metres (16 ft) square mat with a white circle in the centre (1 metre (3.3 ft)in diameter) is placed immediately underneath the competition area. At opposite sides of the mat, a red hoop and a yellow hoop, each measuring 1 metre (3.3 ft) square in diameter, are located. The red hoop is located underneath the red rope floating on the pool's surface while the yellow hoop is below the yellow rope.

== Equipment ==
Competitors wear a swimsuit, a diving mask, fins made of rubber or polyurethane, a water polo cap and two ankle bands (40 centimetres (16 in) long by 5 centimetres (2.0 in) wide) to which 2 coloured ribbons (20 centimetres (7.9 in) square long by 2 centimetres (0.79 in) wide) are fixed. The Competitor on the red side wears a red or blue cap and yellow ribbons while the Competitor on the yellow side wears a white or yellow cap and red ribbons.

== Play ==
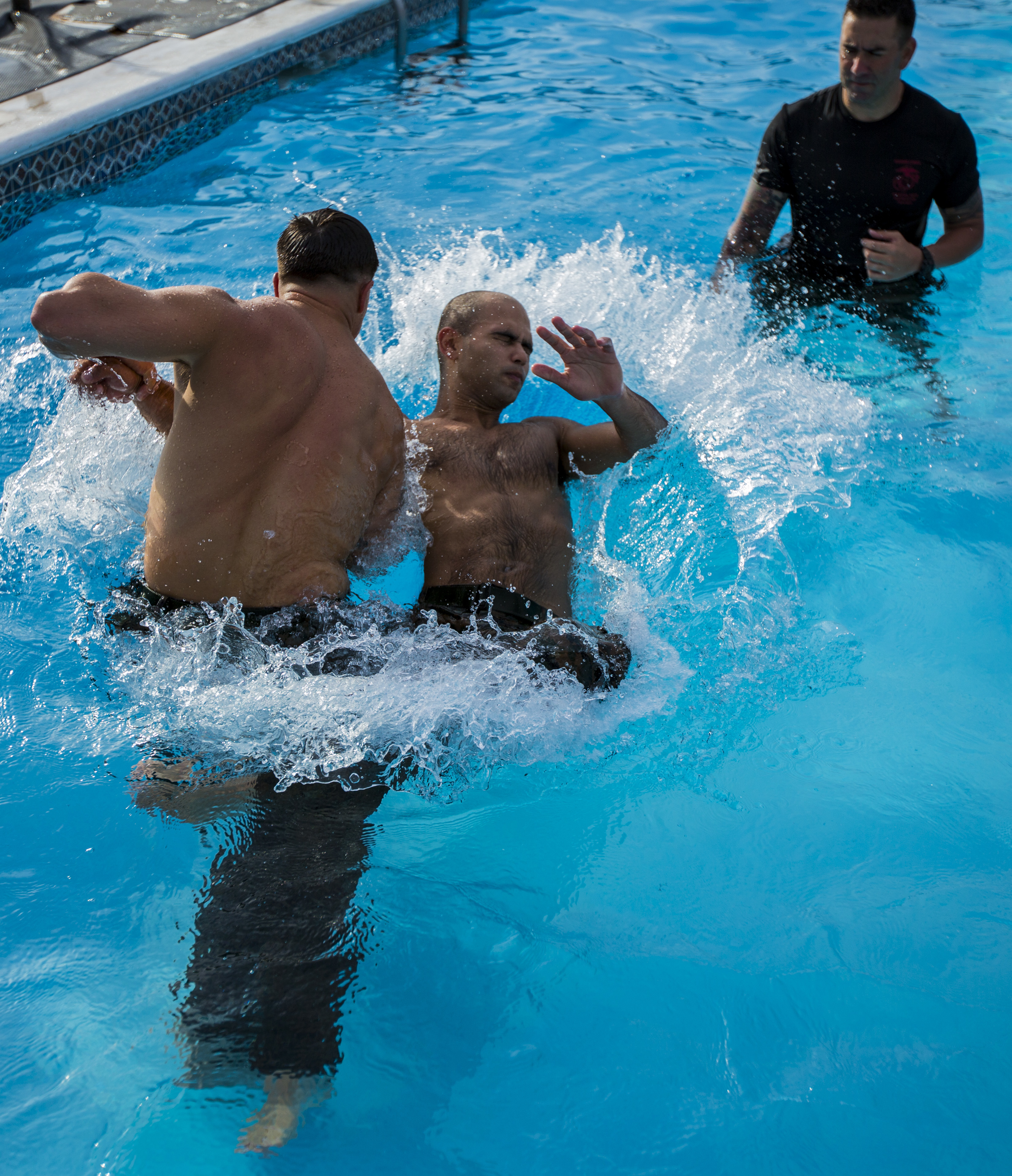
Wrestling above the water surface, both armed and unarmed, are also the aquathlonic disciplines practised by naval personnel worldwide

A competition which is known as a combat consists of three rounds each of 30 seconds duration, and an additional round held to establish the winner in the event of a tie. Intervals between rounds should not be less than 30 seconds and a minimum interval of at least one minute is required between any two combats.

== Origins and history ==
The sport was created and developed during the years 1980 to 1982 by Igor Ostrovsky, an underwater sports coach at the Moscow Technological Institute. It was first officially demonstrated in April 1982 in Moscow. The first International Competition was held during August 1993 in Moscow. During March 1996, representatives of diving federations from Russia, Ukraine and Israel met in Moscow to establish the International Aquathlon Association (IAA). IAA's goals are to develop the sport, encourage the foundation of national federations and associations to play the sport throughout the world, ensure the adoption of international rules of competition and authorise official international competitions. The sport was presented to CMAS in 2007 at the CMAS Games in Bari, Italy. It received recognition from CMAS at the General Assembly held in May 2008 and international level competition under the auspices of CMAS commenced in late 2008. In 2009, the Aquathlon Commission was established within the CMAS Sport Committee with Igor Ostrovsky as its inaugural president.

== Governing body ==
The governing body is the Aquathlon Commission of the CMAS Sports Committee. As of March 2013, the following countries have affiliated with the Commission - Belarus, Croatia, Estonia, Italy, Kazakhstan, Lithuania and Russia.

== Medals ==
According to CMAS Championships Archive

Team (IOC code)	Gold Medals	Silver Medals	Bronze Medals	Total
RUS	25	21	18	64
ISR	19	10	7	36
BLR	0	1	0	1
UKR	5	3	1	9
CRO	0	1	1	2
LTU	2	9	16	27
ESP	1	1	0	2
EST ^{[BIZ]}	4	5	9	18

Included tournaments

- 1st European Championship 2010, Kazan, Russia
- 2nd Aquatlon World Cup 2011, Valladolid, Spain
- 2nd European Championship 2012, Perm, Russia
- Aquathlon Junior World Cup 2013, Evpatoriya, Ukrainia
- Aquathlon Junior Cup 2014, Kaunas, Lithuania
- Aquathlon World Cup 2016, Paldiski, Estonia
- Aquathlon World Cup 2017, Klaipeda, Lithuania

== Championships ==
Prior to 1990, all competition was held in the Soviet Union. The 1st Russian Open Aquathlon Championship was held in Tula in 1992. In 1993, the 1st International Aquathlon Competition was held in Moscow with national teams from Israel, Russia and Ukraine in attendance. A series of Friendship Competitions were held between Israel and Jordan during 1997 in Aqaba, Jordan and during 1998 in Netanya, Israel. Between the years 2000 and 2006, international competitions were held in Moscow, Tula and Sochi in Russia, Istanbul in Turkey, and in Tiraspol in Moldova.

Since May 2008, the following major championships have been conducted under the auspices of CMAS:

- 3rd World Cup held in Kazan, Russia on 7 to 9 August 2013.
- Aquathlon Junior World Cup held in Yevpatoria, Ukraine from 29 to 31 March 2013.
- 2nd European Championship was held in Perm, Russia on 27 April 2012.
- 2nd World Cup held in Valladolid, Spain from 24 to 29 August 2011
- 1st European Championship held in Kazan, Russia on 25 July 2010.
- CMAS Aquathlon European Championship Open held in Kazan, Russia from 28 July to 1 August 2010
- 1st World Cup was held in St. Petersburg, Russia from 24 to 29 August 2009.
- 1st CMAS Aquathlon International Competition was held in Sochi, Russia, from 6 to 10 November 2008.

== See also ==
- Suijutsu – Japanese martial art of combative swimming
