= Elsie Singmaster =

American novelist (1879–1958)

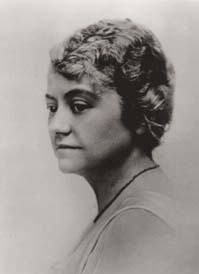
- Singmaster c. 1920
- Born: Elsie Singmaster; August 29, 1879; Schuylkill Haven, Pennsylvania, U.S.
- Died: September 30, 1958 (aged 79); Macungie, Pennsylvania, U.S.
- Occupation: Writer
- Writing career
- Period: 1905–1950
- Genres: Children's literature Young adult fiction
- Notable work: Swords of Steel

Elsie Singmaster Lewars (August 29, 1879 – September 30, 1958) was an American author from Macungie, Pennsylvania, who has been described as "perhaps Macungie's most famous citizen". She was a Newbery Honor recipient in 1934.

== Early life and education ==
Singmaster was born on August 29, 1879, in Schuylkill Haven, Pennsylvania, to parents of German ancestry. She was educated at Allentown High School and West Chester Normal School, before studying at Cornell University from 1898 to 1900. She then attended Radcliffe College, where she graduated in 1907.

In 1912, she married musician and English professor Harold Steck Lewars. She added his surname to hers but continued to publish as Elsie Singmaster. She was pregnant with Lewars' child when he died at the age of 33 in March 1915. Their baby, Singmaster's only child, died two months later in May.

== Career ==
Singmaster wrote many short stories and books between 1905 and 1950. Her first published short story was The Lèse-Majesté of Hans Heckendorn, in the November 1905 issue of Scribner's Magazine. Her first published book was When Sarah Saved the Day, in 1909. Her 1924 short story The Courier of the Czar earned a position of merit in the 1924 O. Henry Award and, perhaps her most famous title, Swords of Steel, received a Newbery Honor in 1934. Her final work was "It Was Once a Jail", published in The Philadelphia Inquirer in January 1950.

An annotated bibliography of Singmaster's Gettysburg writings was published in 2015. Gettysburg College's Musselman Library digitized The Hidden Road in 2019 when the 1923 text entered the public domain.

== Death ==
Singmaster died September 30, 1958, in Macungie, Pennsylvania, and was buried in Fairview Cemetery in Macungie.

== Bibliography ==
- When Sarah Saved the Day: 1909
- Gettysburg: Stories of the Red Harvest and the Aftermath: 1913
- Katy Gaumer: 1915
- Emmeline: 1915
- The Story of Lutheran Missions: 1917
- The Long Journey: 1917
- Martin Luther: 1917
- Basil Everman: 1920
- Ellen Levis: 1921
- Bennett Malin: 1922
- The Hidden Road: 1923
- A Boy at Gettysburg: 1924
- Bred in the Bone, and other Stories: 1925
- The Book of the Constitution: 1926
- The Book of the United States: 1926
- Keller's Anna Ruth: 1926
- Sewing Susie: 1927
- What Everybody Wanted: 1928
- Virginia's Bandit: 1929
- You Make Your Own Luck: 1929
- A Little Money Ahead: 1930
- Swords of Steel: 1933
- The Magic Mirror: 1934
- The Loving Heart: 1937
- Stories of Pennsylvania: 1937
- Rifles for Washington: 1938
- A Cloud of Witnesses: 1939
- Stories to Read at Christmas: 1940
- A High Wind Rising: 1943
- I Speak for Thaddeus Stevens: 1947
- I Heard of a River: 1948

== Sources ==
- Hill, Susan Colestock (2009). Heart Language: Elsie Singmaster and Her Pennsylvania German Writings. Pennsylvania State University Press. ISBN 978-0-271-03543-7.
