= Suijutsu =

Japanese martial art of combative swimming

Suijutsu (水術) or suieijutsu (水泳術) is the Japanese martial art of combative swimming. The Literal translation of the term from Japanese is "water skills". It is sometimes called Nihon eiho.

Various styles existed, which were codified into different ryūha. The Iwakura ryū specialised in techniques for dealing with unusual situations such as consuming meals while in the water. The Shinden ryū taught methods for long-distance swimming, while the Kankai ryū focused on swimming in the ocean. Many schools taught methods of swimming in armour (katchu gozen oyogi). Suijutsu was considered to be one of the bugei jūhappan, the eighteen fundamental martial techniques.

== See also ==
- Aquathlon (underwater wrestling) – Competitive underwater wrestling
- Georgian swimming – Swimming styles
