= Kabutowari =

Japanese samurai weapon

The Kabutowari (Japanese: 兜割; lit. "helmet breaker" or "skull breaker"), also known as hachiwari, was a type of knife-shaped weapon, resembling a jitte in many respects. This weapon was carried as a side-arm by the samurai class of feudal Japan.

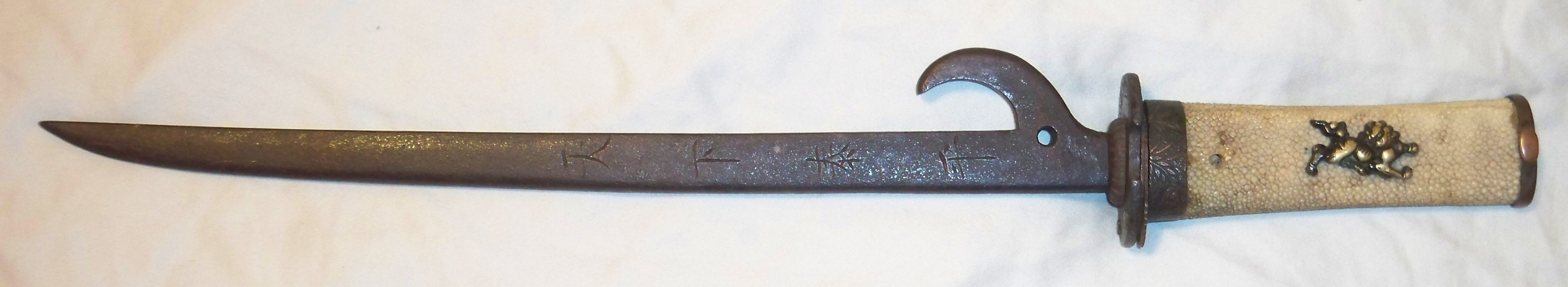
Antique Japanese hachiwari with a nihonto style of handle

== Types ==
Kabutowari were usually around 35 cm (14 in) long; some larger versions are around 45 cm (18 in) long. There were two types of kabutowari: a dirk-type and a truncheon-type.

The dirk-type was forged with a sharp dirk-like point, which could be used to parry an opponent's sword, to hook the cords of armor or a helmet, or like a can opener to separate armor plates. The sharp point could pierce unprotected or weak areas of an opponent's armor like the armpit area. The blade of this type of kabutowari was a curved tapered square iron or steel bar with a hook on its back edge. In combat, one could parry and catch a blade with that hook, as with a jitte. Some kabutowari of this type were mounted in the style of a tantō with a koshirae.

The truncheon-type was blunt, cast iron or forged truncheon-like weapon resembling a tekkan or a jitte. This type of kabutowari had the same basic shape as the dirk-type, including the hook, but it was usually blunt and not meant for stabbing.

== Use ==
It would appear, according to Serge Mol, that tales of samurai breaking open a kabuto (helmet) are more folklore than anything else. The hachi (helmet bowl) is the central component of a kabuto; it is made of triangular plates of steel or iron riveted together at the sides and at the top to a large, thick grommet of sorts (called a tehen-no-kanamono), and at the bottom to a metal strip that encircles the hachi. This would require enormous pressure to split open. This idea that the kabutowari was somehow able to smash or damage a helmet kabuto is most probably a misinterpretation of the name which could have several meanings, as hachi could mean skull or helmet bowl and wari could mean, split, rip, crack or smash.

In modern times there is no ryū (school or style) known to train with kabutowari, although certain dojos within Bujinkan Budo Taijutsu still train with them, as an extension of jittejutsu. A number of weapons retailers in Japan still sell usable kabutowari.

== Gallery ==
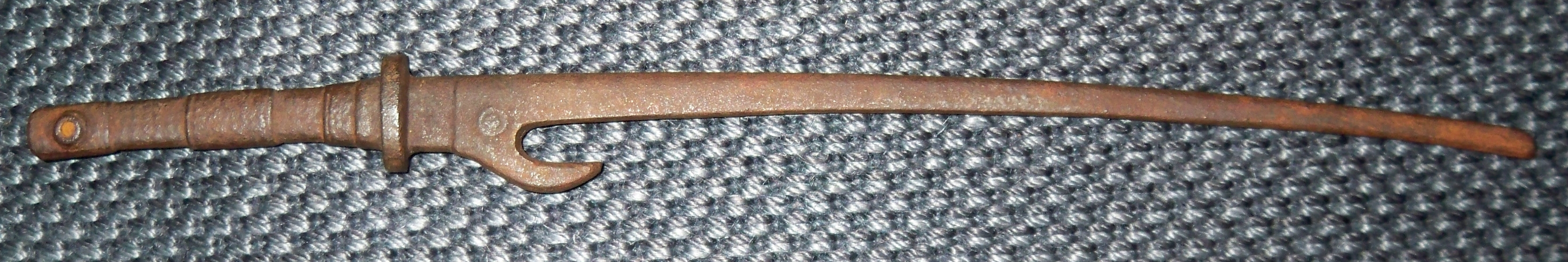
Antique Japanese kabutowari

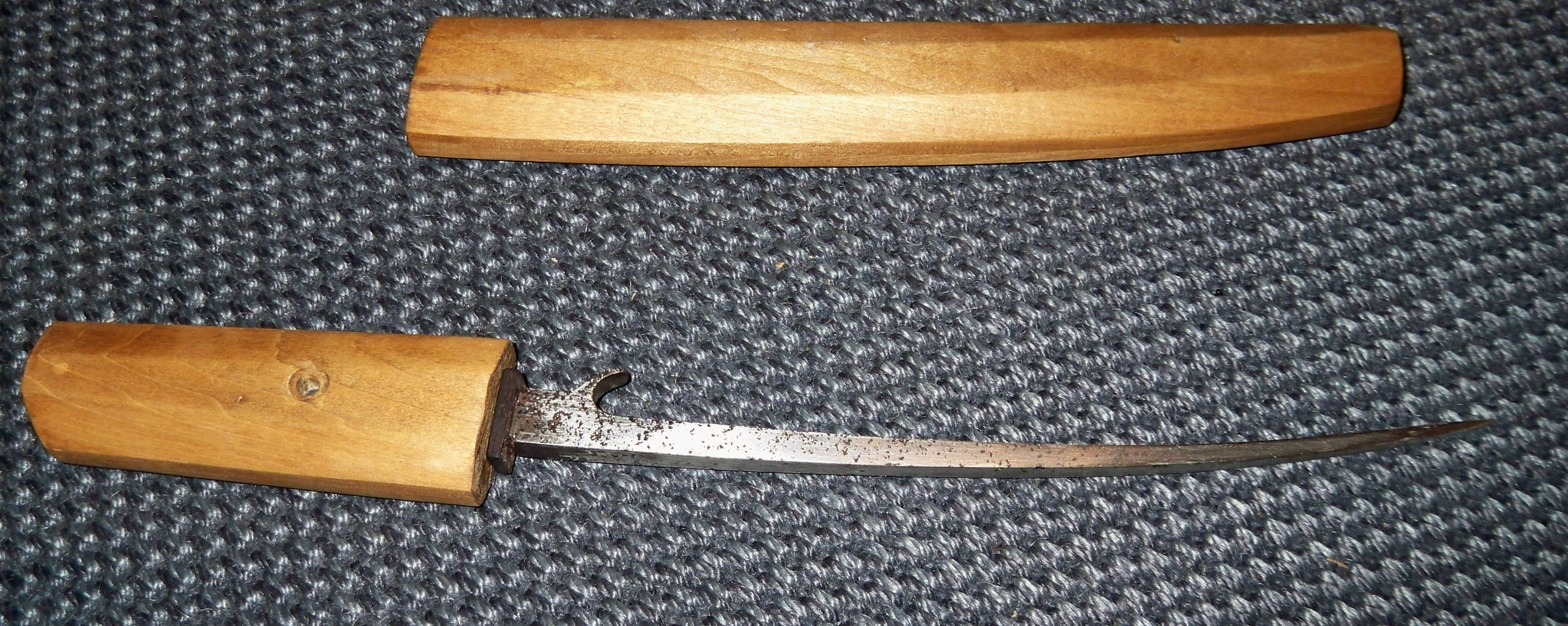
Antique Japanese hachi wari (kabutowari) mounted in a shirasaya

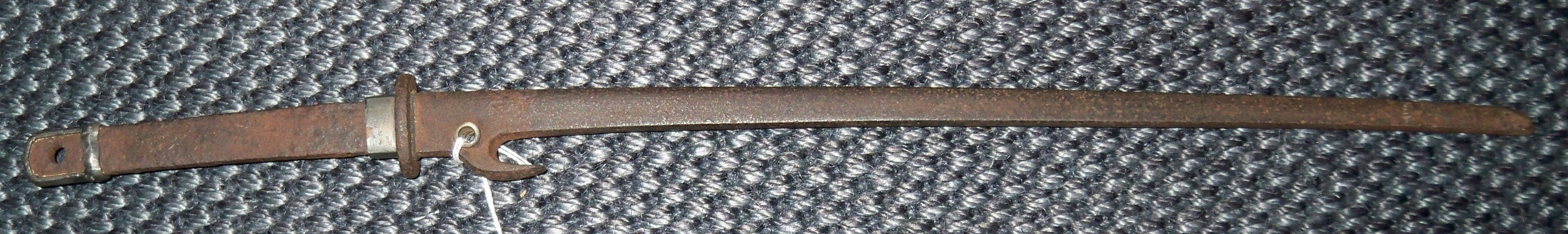
Antique Japanese kabutowari

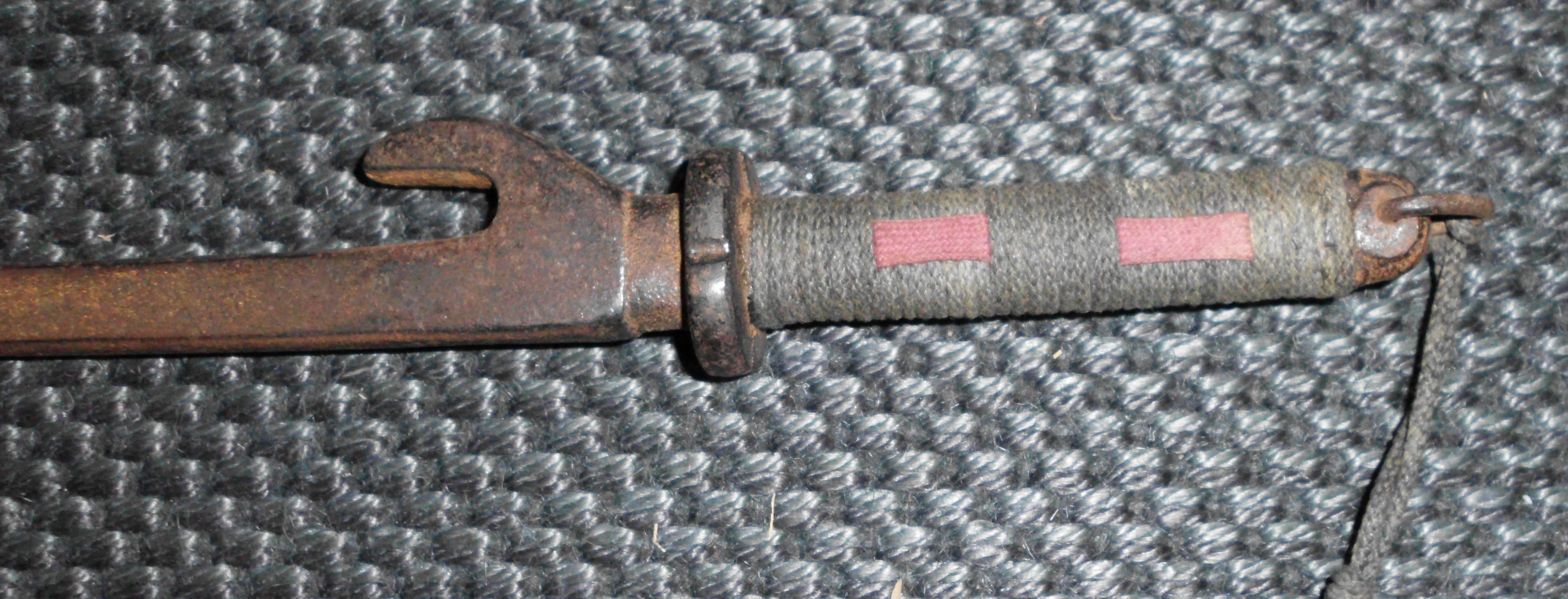
Antique Japanese kabutowari. Close up of the hand guard and the wrapped handle.
