= Hirayama Gyozo =

Japanese fencer and author

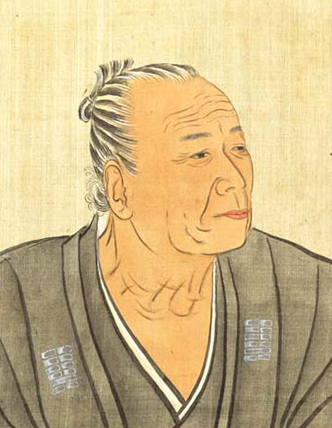
平山行蔵肖像『近世名家肖像』より

Hirayama Gyozo (平山 行蔵, Hirayama Gyōzō, also "Kōzō", 1759–1828) was a Japanese fencer and author of the Kensetsu ("Discourse on Swords"). He founded the Chukō Shingan Ryū, an offshoot of the Shingan school, and emphasised the use of a shorter-than-normal sword. Gyozo is credited with developing the concept of the bugei juhappan (the "eighteen martial arts").
