= Swords of Steel =

Children's historical novel by Elsie Singmaster

- Author: Elsie Singmaster
- Illustrator: David Hendrickson
- Language: English
- Genre: Children's literature / Historical fiction
- Publisher: Houghton
- Publication date: 1933
- Publication place: United States

Swords of Steel is a 1933 children's historical fiction novel written by Elsie Singmaster and illustrated by David Hendrickson. Set before and during the American Civil War, it tells of the childhood and coming of age of a boy from the North and his involvement with the war, and was inspired by Singmaster's childhood growing up in Pennsylvania. It earned a Newbery Honor in 1934.

== Plot summary ==
In 1859, 12-year-old John Deane is living with his family in Gettysburg, Pennsylvania, where he is friends with Nicholas, a black servant, with whom he is training a colt. Deane is devastated when Nicholas is kidnapped by slave catchers and sent to the South to be sold. He learns that his father is a conductor on the Underground Railroad, and he visits Harper's Ferry where he witnesses John Brown's raid.

When the war reaches Pennsylvania, Deane's house is seized by the Confederates, and he is locked in the cellar. However, he is helped by the troop's cook, his old friend Nicholas. Deane later joins the Union Army, where he witnesses the final events of the American Civil War.
