= Jitte =

Japanese non-bladed weapon

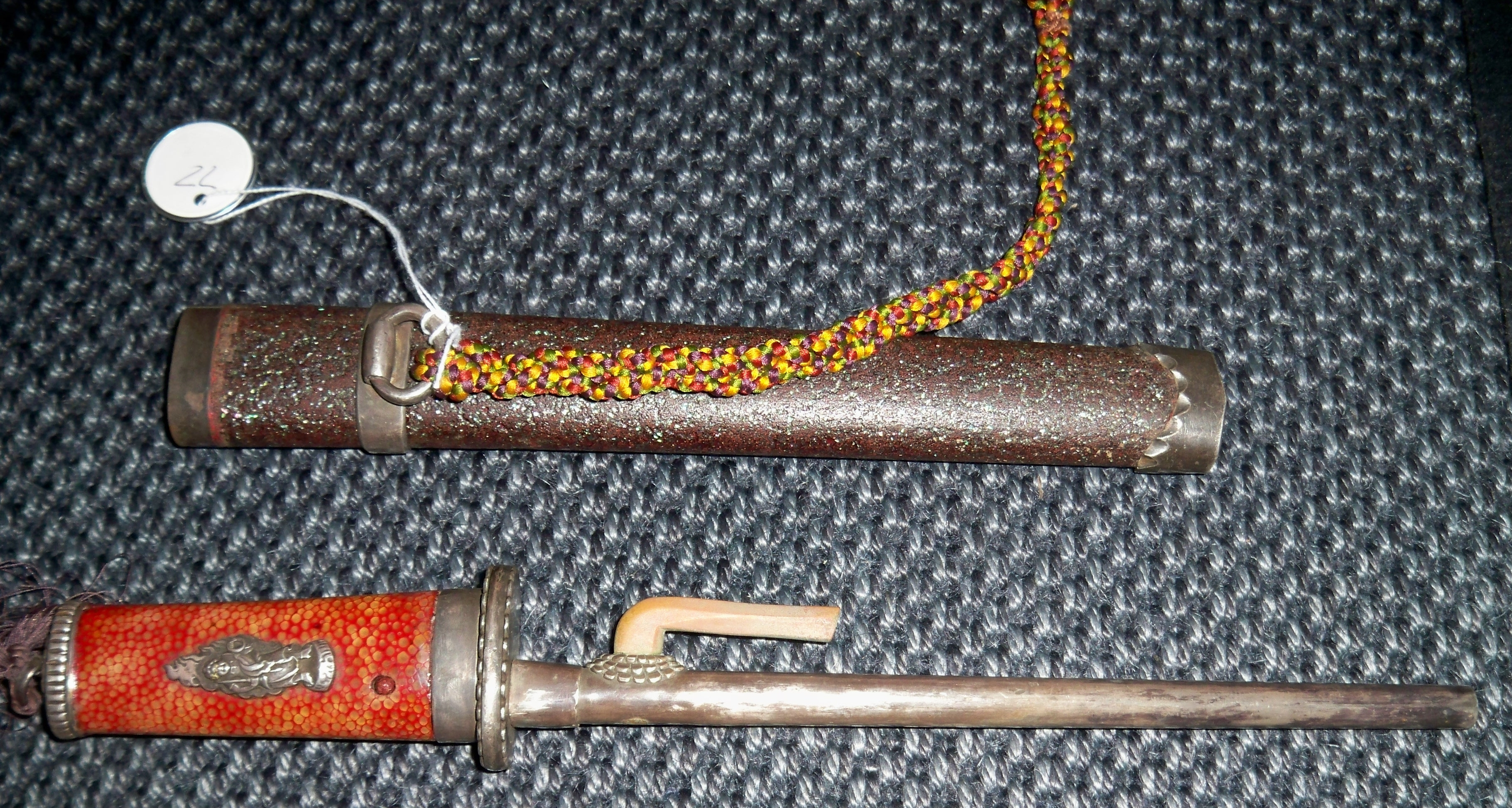
A jitte with a sword-type case (koshirae)

A jitte (十手; "ten hands") is a blunt melee weapon that was used by police in Edo-period Japan (1603–1868). In English-language sources, it is sometimes incorrectly spelled jutte, such as in Ikkaku-ryū juttejutsu.

== History ==
In feudal Japan, it was a crime punishable by death to bring a sword into the shōgun's palace. This law applied to almost everyone, including the palace guards. Due to this prohibition, several kinds of non-bladed weapons were carried by palace guards. The jitte proved particularly effective and evolved to become the symbol of a palace guard's exalted position.

In Edo-period Japan, the jitte was a substitute for a badge, and it represented someone on official business. It was carried by all levels of police officers, including high-ranking samurai police officials and low-rank samurai law enforcement officers (called okappiki or doshin). Other high-ranking samurai officials carried a jitte as a badge of office, including hotel, rice and grain inspectors (aratame). The jitte is the subject of the Japanese martial art of jittejutsu.

== Description and technique ==
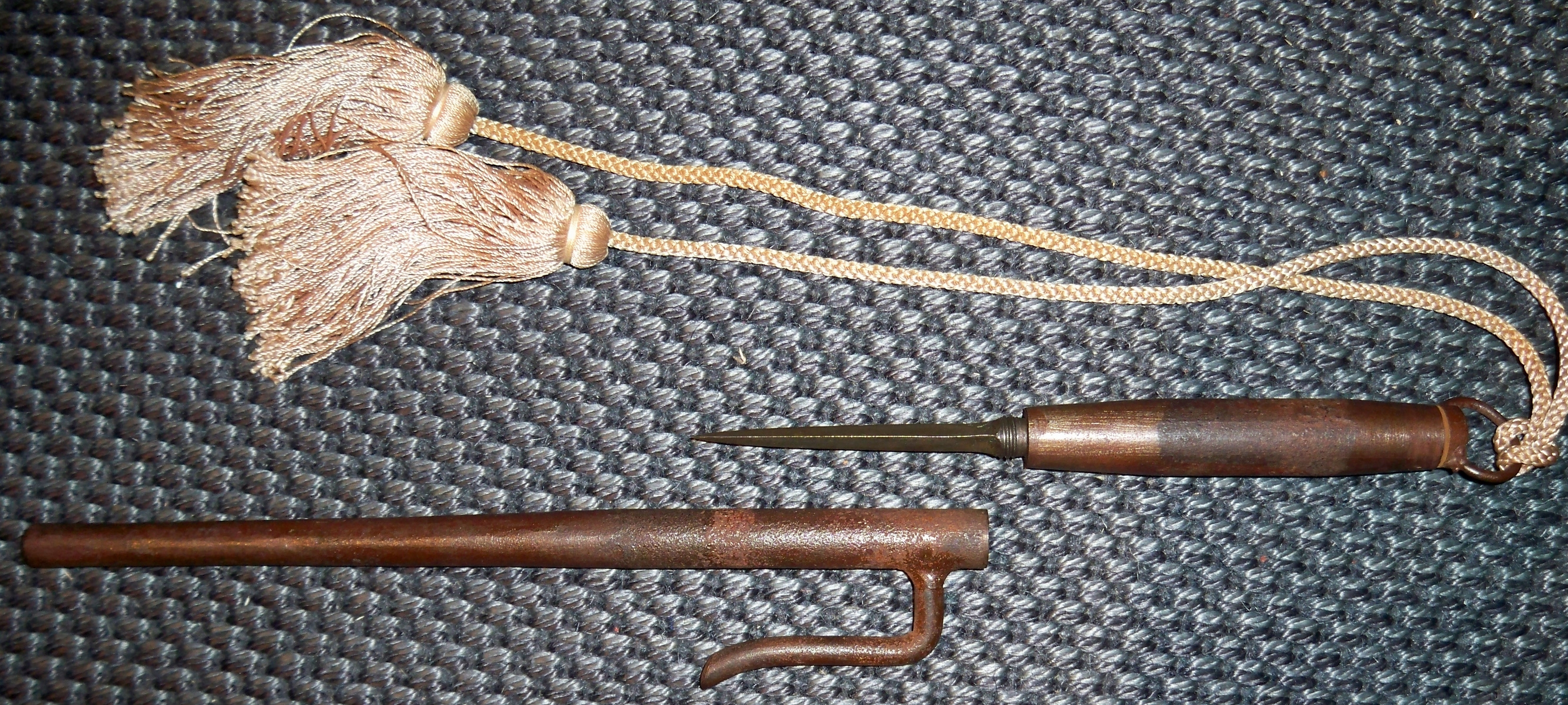
A tassled jitte with a hidden stiletto in the hilt

Jitte may have a small point or blade attached to the hilt (tsuka) and hidden in the main shaft (boshin). Jitte could be highly decorated with all manner of inlays and designs or very plain and basic depending on the status of the owner and the jitte's intended use. Jitte could range in length from around 12 to over 24 in (30–61 cm). The modern jitte has a main shaft of about 45 cm (18 in) long, which ends in a blunt point (sentan), and a one-hooked tine (kagi) of about 5 cm (2.0 in) long starting just above the hilt. A popular misconception is that the kagi is used to catch a sword. It could possibly be used for this purpose, but the hook's proximity to the hand would make it rather dangerous; a more likely use for the hook would be to capture and arrest the blade after blocking it with the boshin. The kagi's more common use is to hook into clothing or parts of the body like the nose or mouth, or to push into joints or other weak points on the body. It also could be used to hook the thumb while holding the weapon backwards, to allow different techniques such as punches and blocks, similarly to a sai. The jitte can also be used in much the same manner as other short sticks or batons, to strike large muscle groups and aid in joint manipulation.

== Parts of the jitte ==
- Boshin, the main shaft of the jitte which could be round or faceted. The boshin of most jitte were iron, but some were made from wood.
- Kagi, the hook protruding from the side of the boshin. Jitte may have more than one kagi, with some jitte having two or even three kagi.
- Kan, the ring or loop at the pommel of the tsuka. A cord or tassel could be tied to the kan. Also note its 'skull cracker' design.
- Kikuza ("chrysanthemum seat"): if the kagi is attached to the boshin through a hole in the boshin, the protrusion on the opposite side is called a kikuza.
- Koshirae. Jitte can occasionally be found housed in a sword-type case hiding the jitte from view entirely. This type of jitte can have the same parts and fittings as a sword, including seppa, tsuba, menuki, koiguchi, kojiri, nakago, mekugi-ana and mei.
- Sentan, the blunt point of the main shaft of the jitte.
- Tsuba, a hand guard present on some types of jitte.
- Tsuka, the hilt of the jitte, which could be wrapped or covered with various materials, or left plain.
- Tsukamaki, the wrapping on the hilt (tsuka). Materials such as ray skin (same), leather, and cord were used.

== Other jitte types and similar weapons ==
- Hachiwara
- Karakuri jitte
- Marohoshi
- Naeshi or nayashi jitte have no hook or kagi.
- Tekkan

== Gallery ==
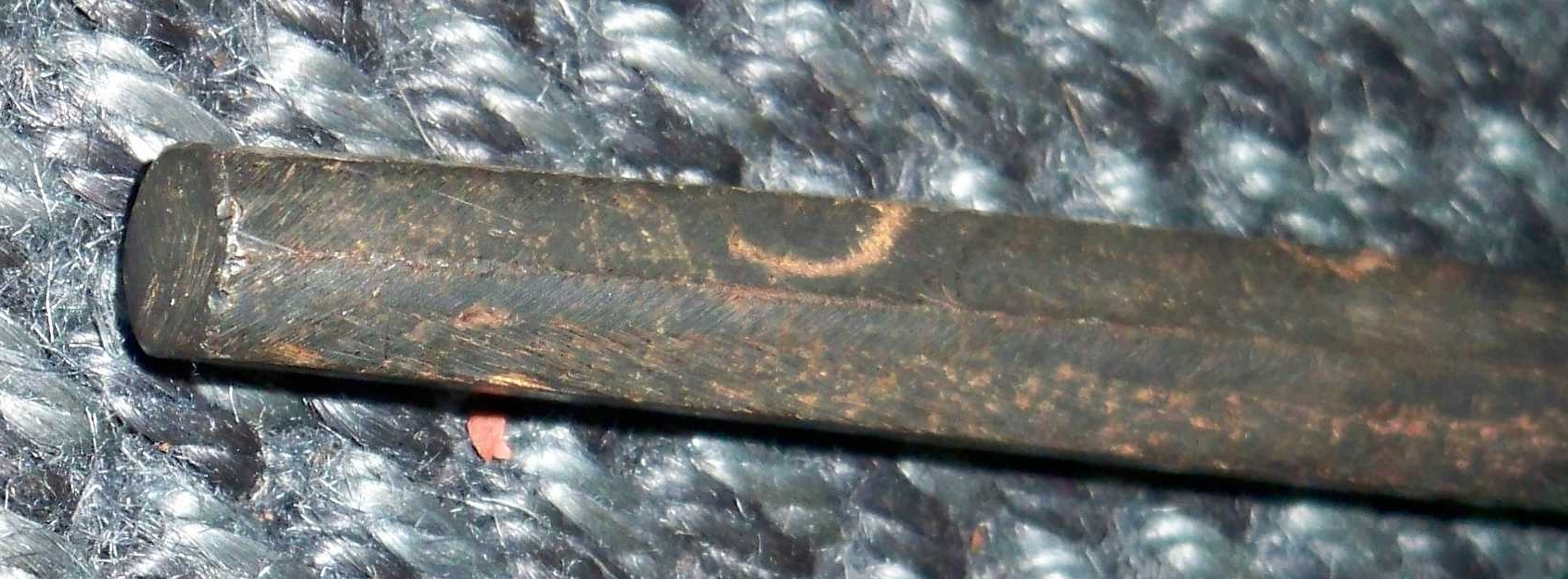
The sentan (tip or point) of a jitte with a hexagonal boshin (shaft)

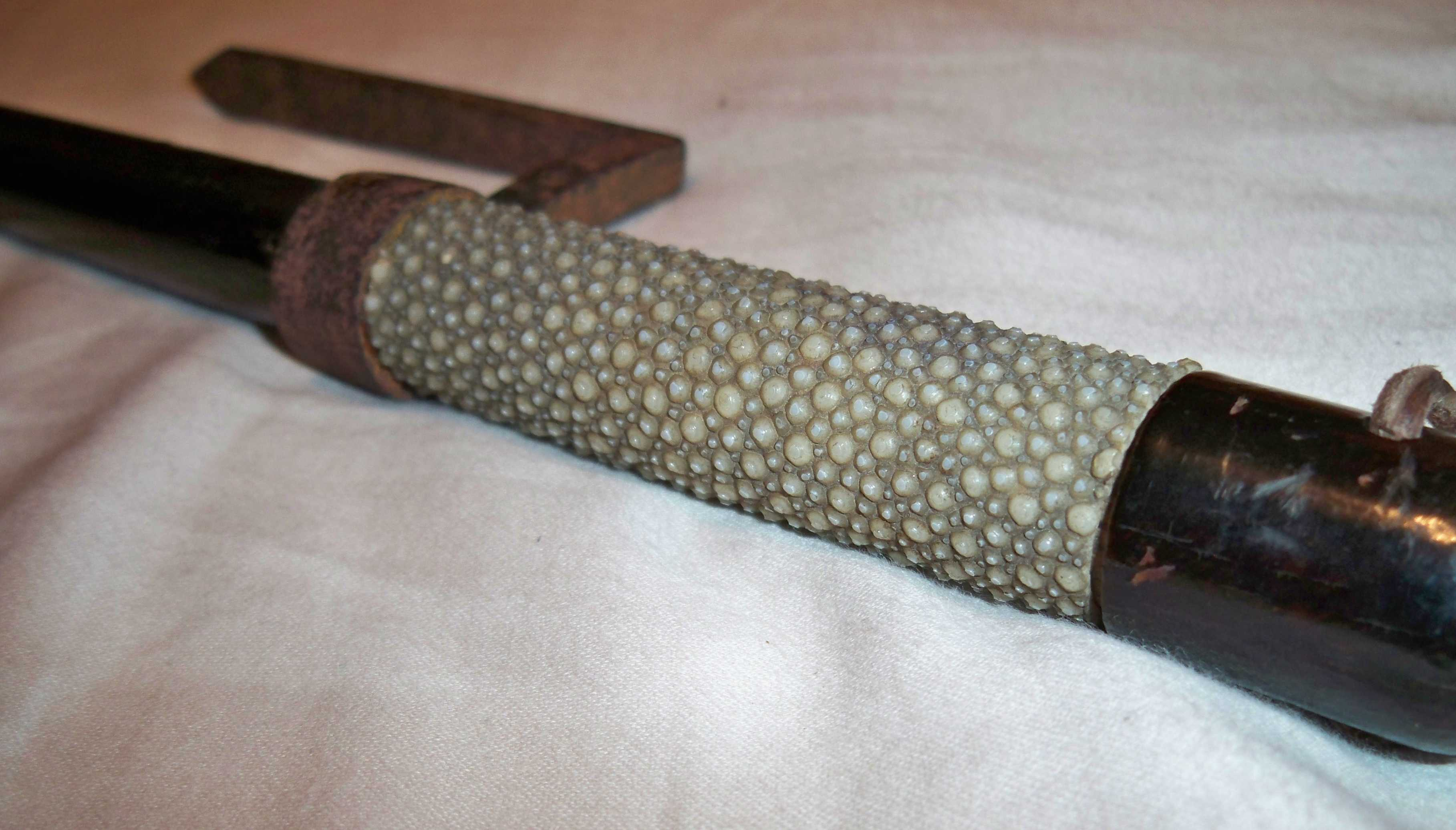
The tsuka (handle) showing the ray skin (same) tsukamaki (handle wrap)

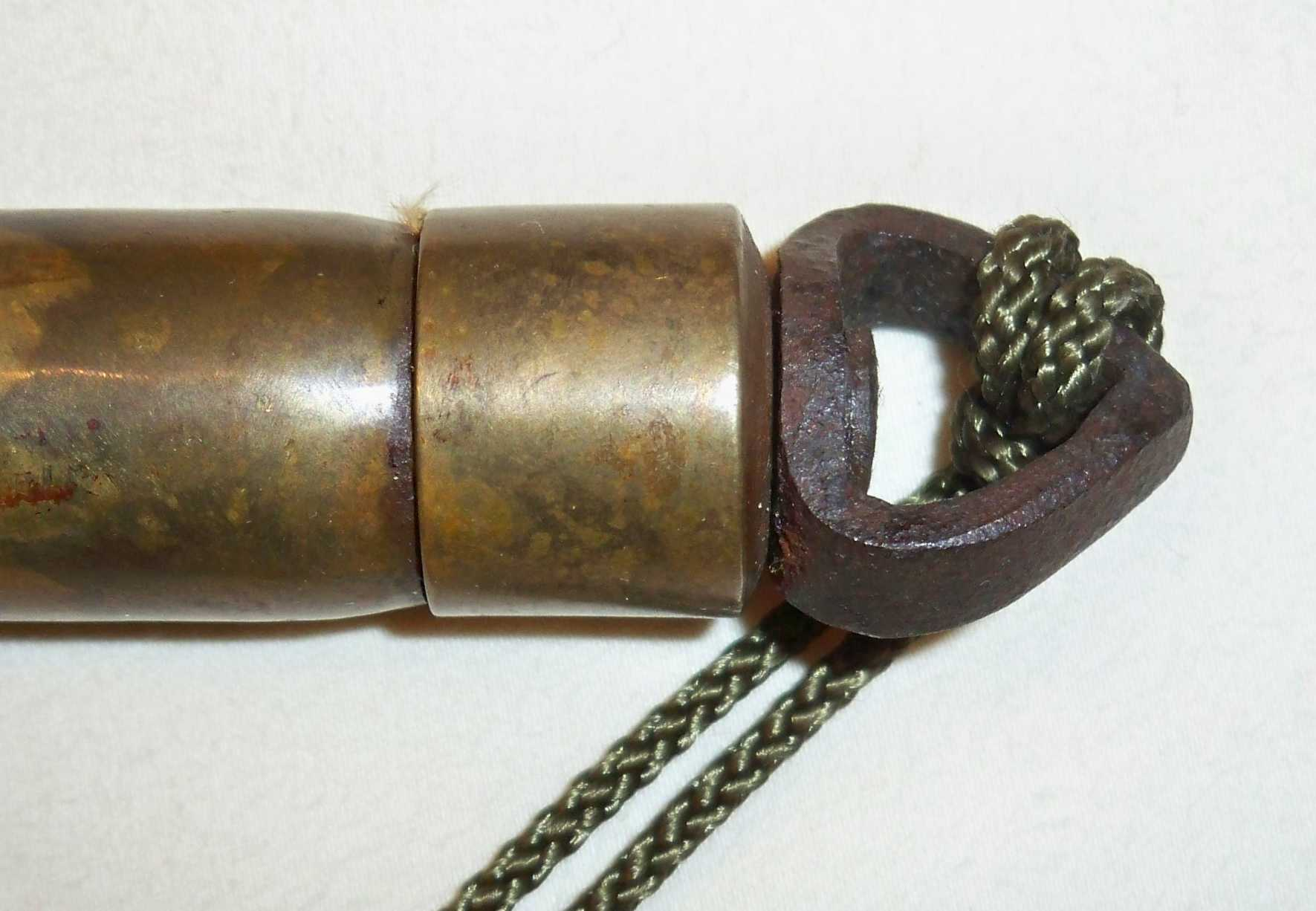
The kan (end loop)

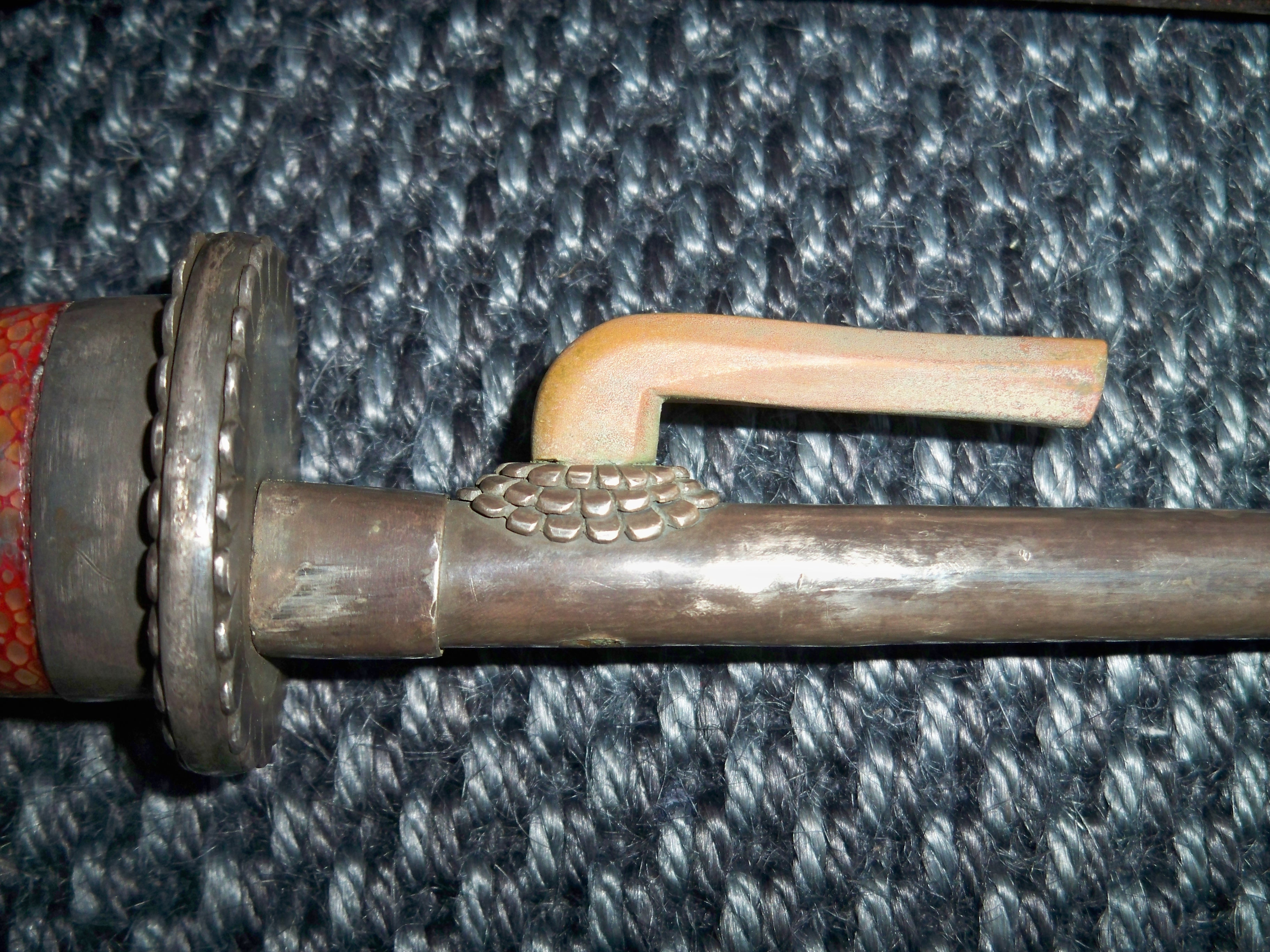
The kagi (hook)

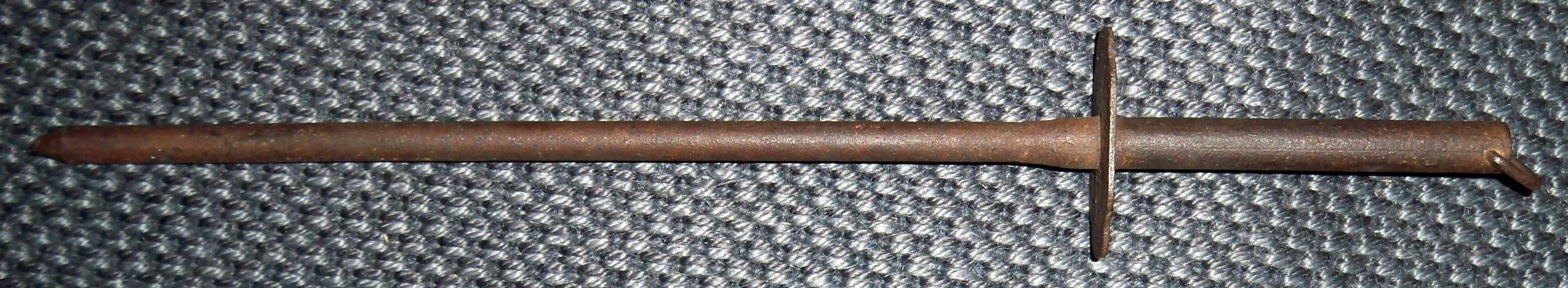
Naesshi or nayashi jitte, a hookless jitte

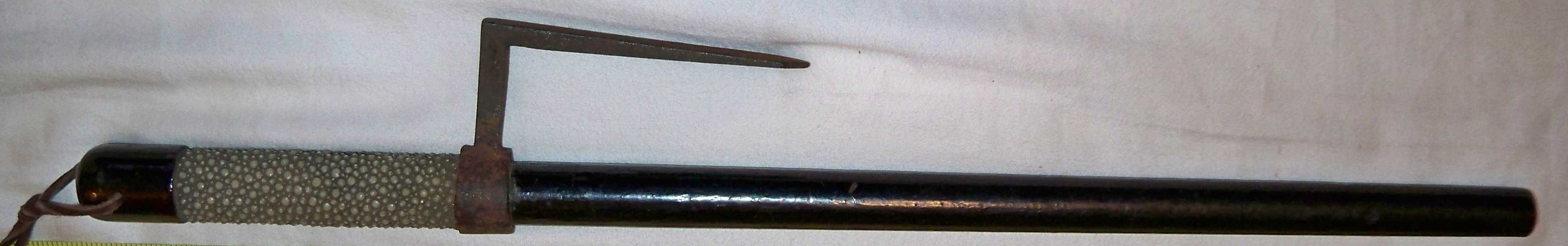
A jitte with a wooden shaft

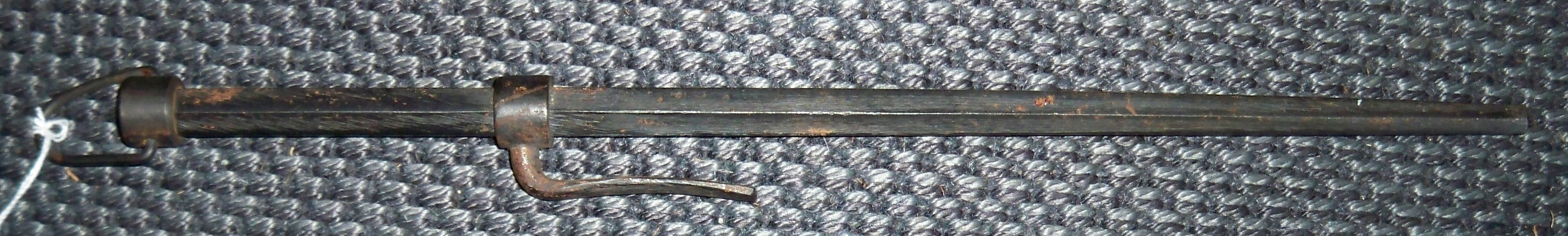
An antique jitte with a hexagonal boshin (shaft)

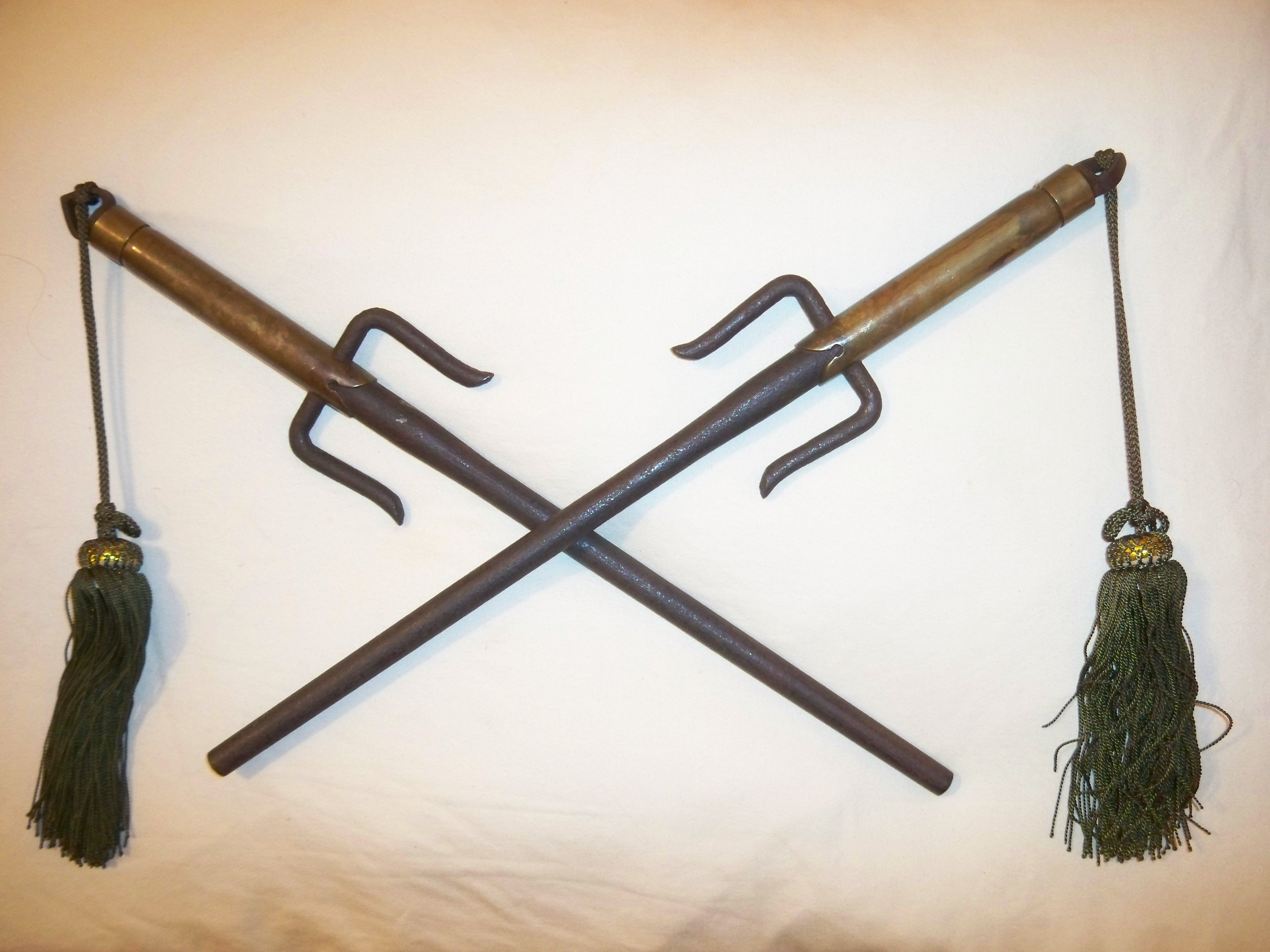
A matched pair of iron jitte and two kagi (hooks), similar to a sai, copper covered tsuka (handle) and iron kan (end loop) with tassel

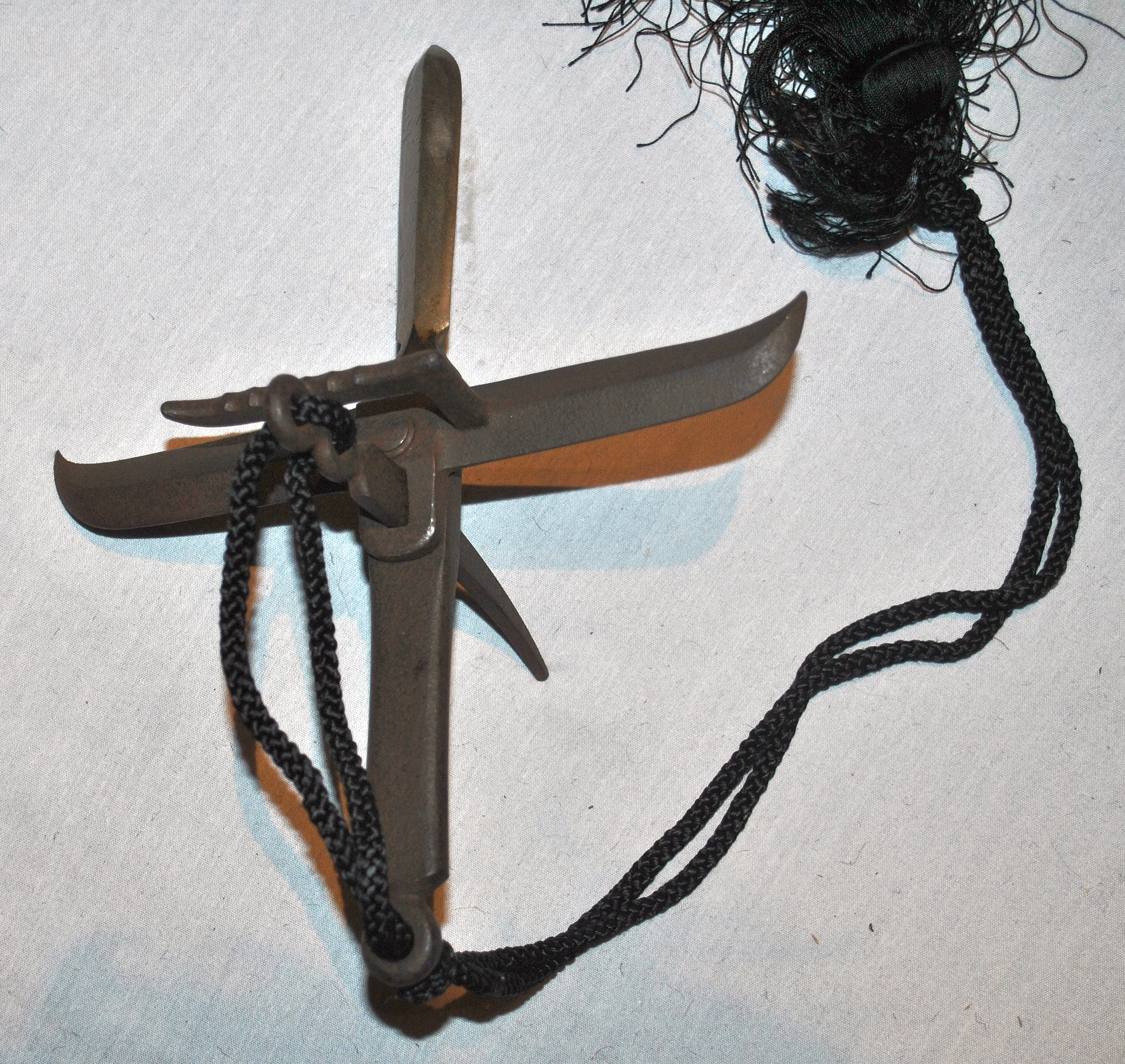
Karakuri jitte
