= Tekkan =

Japanese weapon

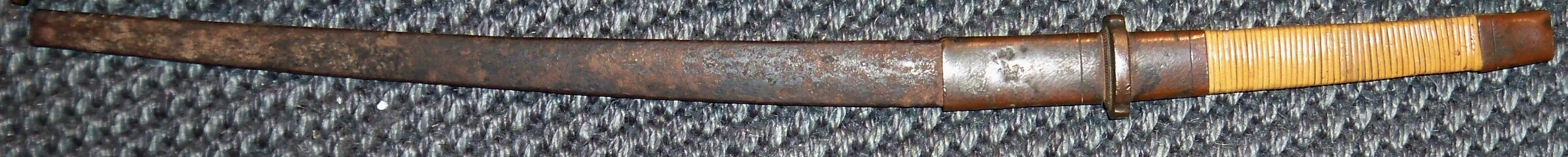
Antique Japanese tekkan (tetsu ken)

The tekkan (Japanese: 鉄管; lit. "iron pipe"), also known as tetsu-ken or tettō (鉄刀; lit. "iron sword"), is a Japanese weapon that was used during the Edo period until the beginning of the 20th century. It was an iron truncheon; it could closely resemble a wakizashi-sized sword with a blunt iron blade, or it could be a cast-iron version of a kabutowari.

Tekkan became very popular during the Edo period with wealthy merchants and farmers, since such people were forbidden by law from carrying or possessing swords or other edged weapons. The tekkan, bearing no edge, had always been permitted by law.

In 1876, the Meiji government of Japan passed the Haitōrei Edict, often called the "Sword Abolishment Act". This law prohibited all Japanese people, including the former members of the knightly samurai class, from bearing weapons in public. This prohibition led to a surge in popularity of a number of non-sword weapons, as well as disguised swords of various kinds. After the Haitōrei Edict came into effect, members of the samurai class also began carrying tekkan as self-defence weapons.

== Gallery ==
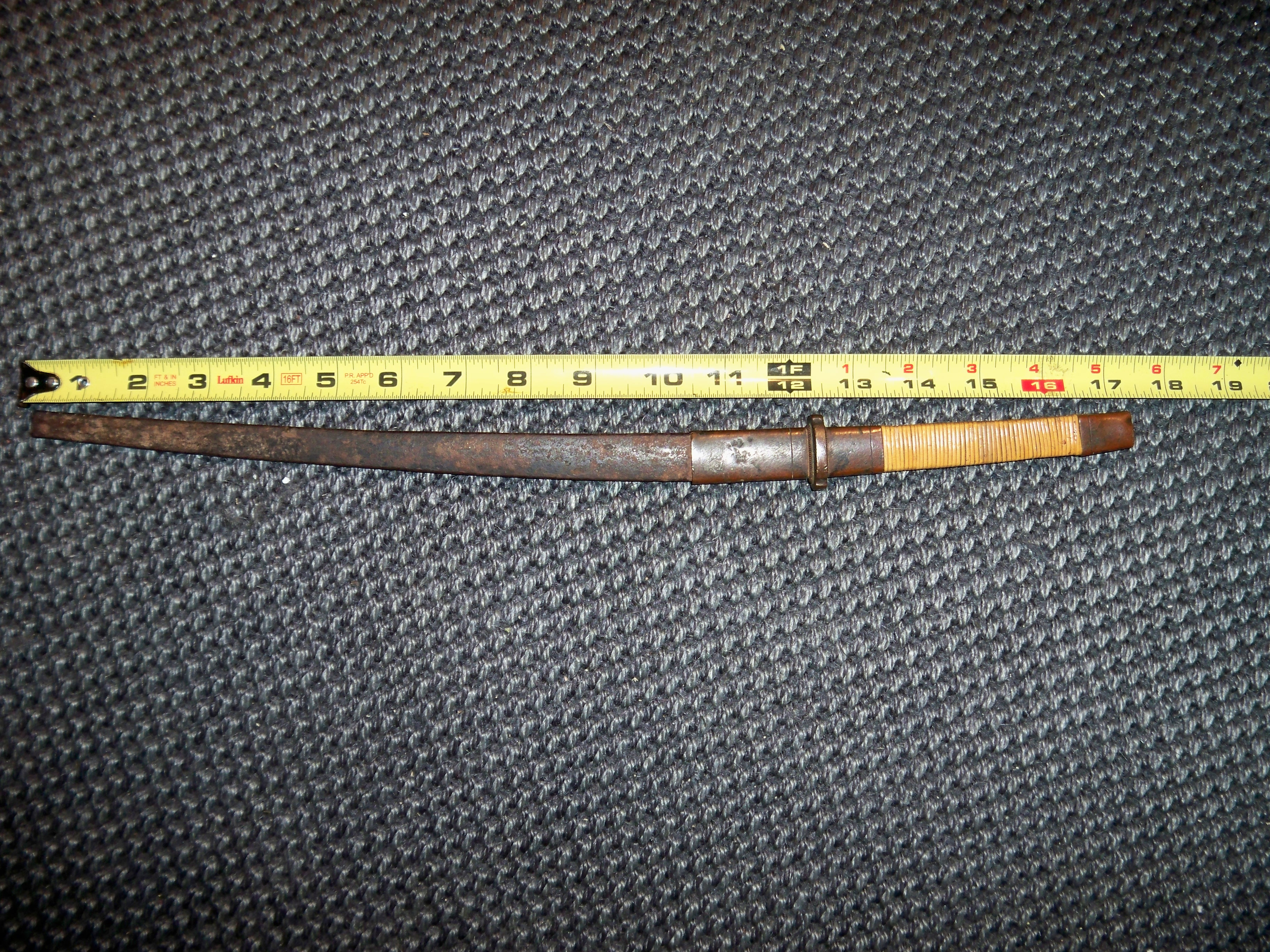
A tekkan

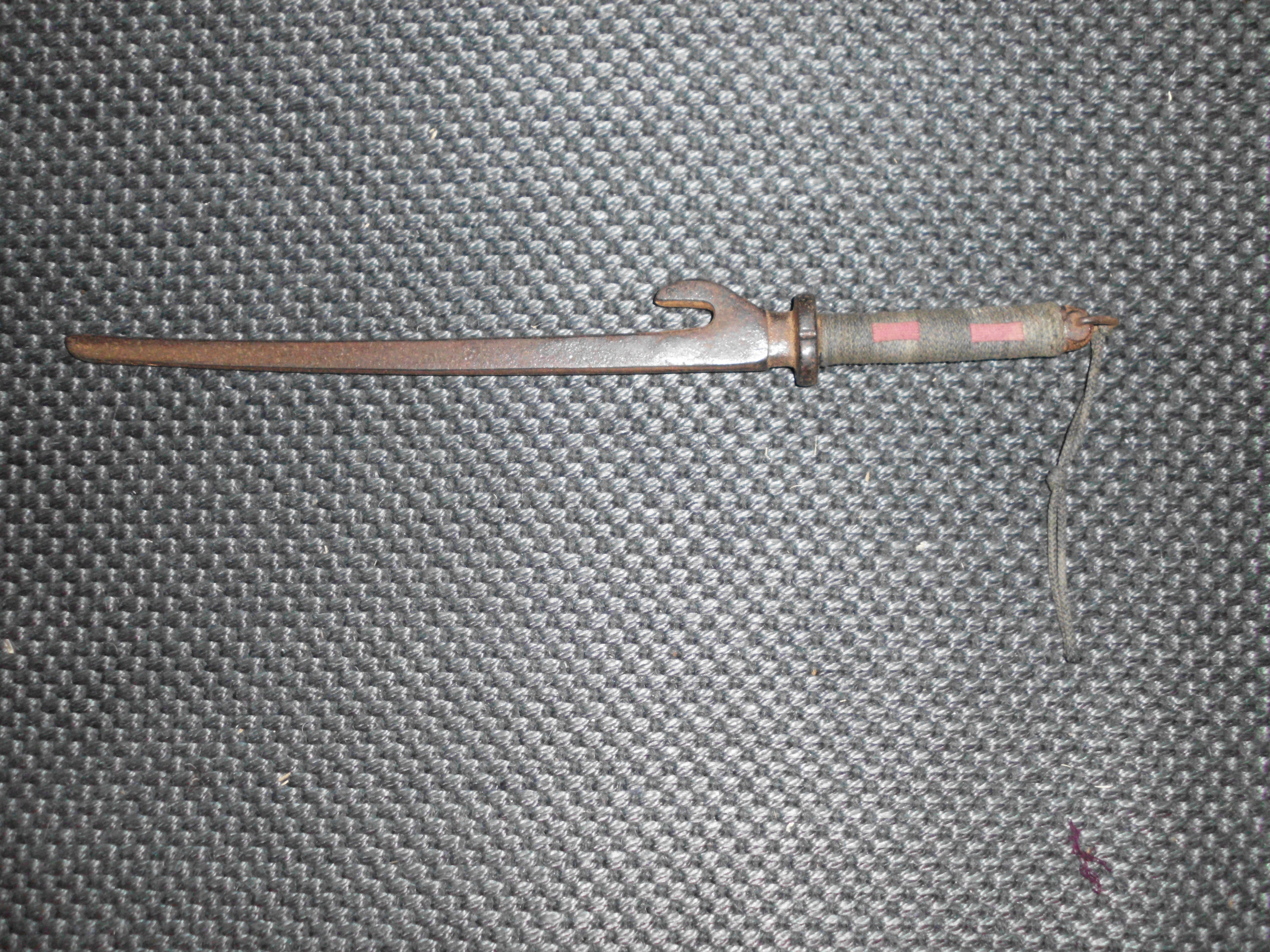
Antique cast-iron truncheon-type kabutowari

== See also ==
- Iaitō
- Jitte
- Kabutowari
